= Abrikosov =

Abrikosov (Russian: Абрикосов; masculine) or Abrikosova (Russian: Абрикосова; feminine) is a Russian surname. It derives from the Russian word "абрикос" (abrikos), meaning apricot and is associated with the Abrikosov family of merchants. The line of Abrikosovs began with the Penza peasant Stepan Nikolayev, who migrated to Moscow in 1802 and later opened a confectionery plant there. As he started his business with importing and selling fruit (including apricots), he petitioned, and in 1814 was allowed, to change his name to Semyon Abrikosov.

Notable people with the surname include:

- Aleksey Abrikosov (1875–1955), Russian/Soviet pathologist
- Anna Abrikosova (1882–1936), Russian Greek Catholic religious sister and literary translator
- Alexei Abrikosov (physicist) (1928–2017), Soviet/Russian theoretical physicist
- Alexei Abrikosov (confectioner) (1824–1904)
- Andrei Abrikosov (1906–1973), Soviet stage and film actor
- Anna Abrikosova (1882–1936), Russian Eastern Catholic and translator
- Grigori Abrikosov (1932–1993)
- Tatiana Abrikosova, Russian basketball player
- Vladimir Abrikosov (1880–1966), Russian Catholic priest

== See also ==
- Abrikosov vortex, a vortex of supercurrent under superconductivity conditions
