= Alexei Abrikosov =

Alexei Abrikosov may refer to:

- Alexei Abrikosov (physicist) (1928–2017), Soviet, Russian and American theoretical physicist
- Alexei Abrikosov (confectioner) (1824–1904), Russian entrepreneur and manufacturer
- Aleksey Abrikosov (1875–1955), Russian/Soviet pathologist
