= Anna Abrikosova =

Russian Catholic religious sister and translator (1882–1936)

Servant of God Ekaterina Sienskaja Abrikosova TOSD
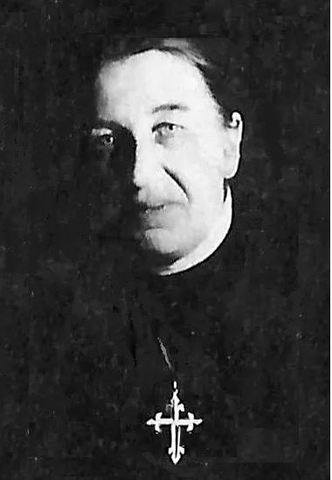
- Born: Anna Ivanova Abrikosova; January 23, 1882; Kitaigorod, Moscow, Russian Empire
- Died: July 23, 1936 (aged 54) at the Butyrka prison, Moscow, Soviet Union

Anna Ivanovna Abrikosova TOSD (Russian: Анна Ивановна Абрикосова; 23 January 1882 – 23 July 1936), later known as "Mother Catherine of Siena" (Russian: Екатери́на Сие́нская, Ekaterína Siénskaya), was a Russian Greek Catholic religious sister and literary translator, who died after more than a decade of solitary confinement as a prisoner of conscience in Joseph Stalin's concentration camps.

Born into a family that had risen within only a few generations from serfdom into members of the hereditary Russian nobility, Abrikosova grew up as a family friend of Lev Tolstoy, Peter Kropotkin, and many other important figures in Russian political and intellectual life during the Silver Age.

By the time she attended Girton College, Cambridge, Abrikosova had become, according to her roommate Lady Dorothy Georgiana Howard (the grandmother of the present Lord Henley), "a nice Russian girl of the anti-Government-type"; meaning a Narodnik agrarian socialist, but who opposed the use of assassination, terrorism, or propaganda of the deed to achieve what she saw as positive change. After leaving Cambridge without a degree, Abrikosova married her first cousin Vladimir Abrikosov, who shared her Far Left views and spent many subsequent years living in West Europe.

After deciding that it was necessary to win her lifelong battle against clinical depression, Abrikosova returned to Christianity and was received into the Roman Catholic Church at the St. Vincent de Paul chapel of the Church of the Madeline in Paris in 1908. After some resistance on her husband's part, Vladimir Abrikosov was also received into the Catholic Church inside the same chapel in 1909. They were both told, however, that they belonged under Canon Law to the Byzantine Rite. After their return to Moscow in 1910, the Abrikosovs launched a successful but highly illegal campaign of evangelism among the overwhelmingly secularized Russian intelligentsia and became, alongside Pope St. Pius X, Andrey Sheptytsky, and Leonid Feodorov, one of the driving forces behind the canonical formation of the Russian Greek Catholic Church in 1917.

After their marriage was dissolved as being between too closely related spouses, Vladimir was ordained as a Byzantine Catholic priest. Anna became the foundress of a Byzantine Catholic sisters' community of the Third Order of St. Dominic, who all vowed in August 1917, similarly to the Discalced Carmelite Martyrs of Compiègne, to offer themselves up as a sacrifice to the Holy Trinity for the Salvation of the Russian people.

After the October Revolution and the beginning of seven decades of Atheist-motivated religious persecution under orders from Soviet Premier Vladimir Ilyich Lenin, Abrikosova and the sisters continued their religious work. They also began, in nonviolent resistance to Soviet anti-religious legislation and despite fully knowing they were under Soviet secret police surveillance, a strictly illegal Catholic school for parishioners who did not wish to expose their children to indoctrination into Marxist-Leninist atheism in the Soviet public school system. The sisters also engaged in mass literary translation of Catholic books into the Russian language and, in defiance of censorship in the Soviet Union, circulated their translations as Samizdat.

Despite their mass arrest in November 1923, this sisters community has since gained wide attention, even among purely secular historians of the Russian Revolution and its aftermath. The collector and editor of a 2001 anthology of women's memoirs from the Gulag, feminist historian Veronica Shapovalova, has highly praised Anna Abrikosova as, "a woman of remarkable erudition and strength of will", who, "managed to organize the sisters in such a way that even after their arrest they continued their work."

Despite Abrikosova's death from spinal cancer after more than a decade of solitary confinement in the Gulag in 1936, because of the surviving sisters of her community, the underground Russian Greek Catholic Church continued to exist on Soviet soil among both the sisters and their many secret converts among the laity, even when there were no longer any Russian Catholic priests left to administer the Sacraments.

Since 2002, Abrikosova's life has been under scrutiny for possible beatification by the Holy See, which considers her a martyr under Vladimir Lenin and Joseph Stalin's religious persecution of the Catholic Church in Russia and, in particular, as a martyr for the cause of Catholic schools and Classical Christian education. Abrikosova is one of the seven Soviet-era Martyrs and Confessors whom historian Fr. Christopher Lawrence Zugger has termed, "the Passion bearers of the Russian Catholic Exarchate". Mother Catherine Abrikosova's current title is Servant of God.

== Ancestry ==
Although her ancestors had only recently been peasant serfs enslaved by the aristocratic Balashov family in Penza Governorate, by the time of Anna's birth in 1882, the Abrikosovs were a wealthy and cultured family of industrialists and philanthropists. The Abrikosov family ran a company which was the official supplier of confections, gingerbread, candies, and jams to the Russian Imperial Court and had accordingly been raised to the hereditary Russian nobility by Tsar Alexander III. Anna's grandfather, the industrialist Alexei Ivanovich Abrikosov, was the founder of the family fortune. Her father, Ivan Alexeievich Abrikosov, was expected to take over the family firm until his death from tuberculosis. Her brothers included senior Russian Foreign Office diplomat Dmitri Ivanovich Abrikosov and Alexei Ivanovich Abrikosov, the doctor who embalmed Vladimir Lenin and later served as the personal physician to Joseph Stalin. Anna's cousin and adopted brother Khrisanf Abrikosov was a close friend of novelist Leo Tolstoy and a senior member of the latter's religious movement.

Although the younger members of the family rarely attended Divine Liturgy, the Abrikosovs regarded themselves as pillars of the Russian Orthodox Church.

== Early life ==
=== Childhood ===
Anna Ivanovna Abrikosova was born on 23 January 1882 in Kitaigorod, Moscow, Russian Empire. The memoirs of Anna's brother Dmitrii allege that their parents had longed for a daughter, but that their mother, Anna Dmitrievna (née Arbuzova), died while giving birth to Anna, and their father died ten days later, of tuberculosis.

A "Family Chronicle" by Khrisanf Abrikosov, however, alleges that Anna's mother, who was suffering from postpartum depression and unable to face the imminent death of her husband from tuberculosis, in reality committed suicide six months after the birth of their daughter by taking poison. Khrisanf further alleges that this fact was carefully concealed from Anna and her brothers.

Following their deaths, Ivan and Anna Abrikosov were buried in the Aleksei Cemetery in Moscow, under an inscription which Ivan's father had chosen from the Book of Isaiah: "My thoughts are not your thoughts; neither are your ways My ways. For as the heavens are higher than the earth, so are My ways higher than your ways, and My thoughts higher than your thoughts."

As their father had stipulated before he died, Anna and her four brothers were adopted and raised by their paternal uncle, Nikolai Alekseevich Abrikosov.

Dmitrii Abrikosov later recalled, "We were healthy children, quickly became friends with our new brothers and sisters, and filled the big house of our uncle with perpetual noise. When I was older I often asked how my uncle and aunt, who were both young, loved to have a social life and receive guests, could so readily have reconciled themselves to the doubling of family. The answer lay, of course in their wonderful character. My uncle... had no interest in the innumerable businesses created by my grandfather and passed his spare time in his library or the laboratory. The habit of meditating about higher matters made a real philosopher of him; unperturbed by the little things of this life, he faced all difficulties with absolute calmness. He never regretted what might have been, and was always reconciled with the facts of life."

Dmitrii continues, "His wife, my aunt Vera, with whom he lived for fifty-three years through all the vicissitudes of fortune, was his chief support in life. She was a wonderfully nice and exceptionally refined person, never angry and equally kind to everybody; to her relatives and friends, the ten (and after the birth of another boy eleven) children and the numerous nurses, housekeepers, governesses, and other servants rich Russian families in days past. As a result everybody thought only of pleasing her."

Every year, the summers were spent at "The Oaks" (Russian: Дубы), a dacha and country estate at Tarasovka, Moscow Governorate, which Nikolai Abrikosov had purchased from an ethnic German businessman. The rest of the year was spent in the family's Moscow house near Chistye Prudy. The latter home had reportedly been a prison during the 18th-century and had survived the Great Fire of Moscow in 1812. Chains were sometimes still visible on the walls and the house was said, by the servants, to be haunted by the ghost of Vanka Kain, an infamous, "gangster, kidnapper, [and] burglar", who was, "the scourge of Moscow during the 1730s and '40s", and who, despite eventually becoming a police informant, remained a local folk hero.

The memoirs of Dmitrii Abrikosov "describes their childhood as carefree and joyous" and writes that their English governess "was quite shocked at the close relationship between parents and children." She used to say that in England, "children were seen and not heard." Due to having been raised by an English governess, Anna Abrikosova always spoke the Russian language with a slight British upper class accent.

== Education ==
=== Teacher's college ===
According to her college roommate Lady Dorothy Georgiana Howard, Anna Abrikosova first read about Girton College, the all-girls adjunct to Cambridge University, when she was only eight years of age and dreamed about attending. By the time she reached the age of 16, according to Lady Dorothy, Anna Abrikosova had shifted to, "dreams of teaching rows of little children all that was interesting and beautiful and good."

Demonstrating her academic gifts, Anna Abrikosova graduated with Gold Medal Grade from the First Women's Lyceum in Moscow in 1899. According to historian Veronica Shapovalova, "To get awarded a gold medal, a student had to have As in all subjects in the last two years of school. All graduation exams must also be As. A gold medal gave the student the privilege of taking only one entrance examination into any institute or university."

Anna Abrikosova then entered a teacher's college, where the all-female and Far Left student body ostracized and emotionally bullied her for being from a wealthy family. While Anna Abrikosova was, according to Lady Dorothy Howard, "a nice Russian girl of the anti-government type", and, while sympathetic to the agrarian socialist Narodniks and other Far Left groups, she opposed anarchism and also refused to join any secret society or paramilitary organization. She also both knew and cared very deeply about the peasant families who lived on her family's estate at Tarasovka.

Even though she repeatedly told her fellow students that she sympathized with their Marxist beliefs, Anna Abrikosova later told Lady Dorothy Howard, "Every day as I went into the room the girls would divide up the passage and stand aside not to brush me as I passed because they hated me as one of the privileged class." On another occasion, the other girls loudly hissed when Anna Abrikosova's name was mentioned by a professor as one of the three highest scoring female students. After an entire term of this treatment, an extremely depressed Anna was withdrawn from the Teacher's College by her family, who placed her instead in a College for women from her own social class.

After classes broke up at this other school, Anna briefly taught at a Russian Orthodox parochial school but was forced to leave after the priest threatened to denounce her to the Okhrana for being, "not strictly Orthodox", and for teaching her students that Hell does not exist.

=== Girton College ===
Although heartbroken, Anna then decided to pursue an old dream of attending Girton College, the all-girls adjunct to Cambridge University.

Her brother Dmitrii Ivanovich later wrote, "In those days Russian girls did not think of amusement but of study, going on to the university, studying medicine, and mixing in politics. My sister was not an exception to the general rule, but under the influence of our English governess chose an English college; the whole family approved wholeheartedly, for thereby she would be free from politics and the pressure to bow down to the tyranny of solidarity in holding extreme views expected of serious women."

With her brother Dmitrii acting as her chaperone during the journey to England, Anna first visited their brother Ivan, who was studying mathematics at the University of Heidelberg. After briefly sightseeing and listening to the lectures of Prof. Kuno Fischer, Anna and Dmitrii Abrikosov continued on to Girton College, where he left his sister behind.

While studying history from 1901 to 1903, Anna Abrikosova, according to a 1936 obituary written by Hélène Iswolsky and published in l'Année Dominicaine, was given the English language nickname "In Dead Earnest", by her fellow students.

She befriended Lady Dorothy Georgiana Howard, the daughter of the 9th Earl and "Radical Countess" of Carlisle, and grandmother of the present Baron Henley. While at Girton, Lady Dorothy, who later became a prominent suffragette, wrote regular letters to her mother, which remain one of the best sources for Anna's college days.

Another member of Anna Abrikosova's six closest friends at Girton College was the future archaeologist Gisela Richter, who was studying Classics. Richter later wrote, "A friend whom I especially was valued was Ania Abrikossova (sic). She, so to speak, introduced me to Russia, for through her I met her relatives and friends, all of whom were more or less refugees (under the Czarist regime)."

At this time, Anna's cousin and adopted brother, Khrisanf Nikolaevich Abrikosov, was living with many fellow Russian political exiles, including at least one former member of the terrorist organization Narodnaya Volya, as part of the Tolstoyan commune in Croydon, Surrey.

According to Richter, their friendship began during the first year at Girton and, by the second year, all seven girls were allowed to change their rooms and "decided to have quarters close to one another".

During the fall of 1901, Anna Abrikosova shared with her Girton College friends her concern over the sufferings caused by the ongoing Russian famine to the peasants on her family's estate at Tarasovka. At the urging of her fellow students, Anna formed a famine relief fund to set up a soup kitchen at Tarasovka and, to help raising money, imported embroidered Russian peasant women's scarves. The female students at Girton sold the scarves to their families in return for donations to "the famine fund."

During a visit home for Russian Orthodox Christmas of 1901, Anna Abrikosova, according to Lady Dorothy Howard, almost singlehandedly defused a peasant riot at Tarasovka and in the process saved the life of a senior Tsarist Procurator, who was in the process of being both robbed of his money and savagely beaten. Anna then called upon the Procurator in Moscow and, with the help of an aristocratic admirer codenamed "Prince So and So", convinced the outraged Tsarist official to call off his plans for revenge and to drop all charges against the peasants who had assaulted him.

Afterwards, one of Anna's Narodnik friends, "who belongs to a secret society which Ania won't join", lured her into a show trial for allegedly committing counter-revolution. Anna Abrikosova was reportedly horrified during the show trial, "and she felt she was going to be eaten". Her crime, according to the Narodniks, was stopping the riot instead of urging the peasants of Tarasovka into further escalation of the violence, as, "it was just an opportune moment for rousing them up to rebel". In response, Anna accused the Narodniks of being "monstrous" to "egg it on". Lady Dorothy concluded, "The talk went on and finally they broke up the meeting saying it would continue to take advantage as best it could of what had happened in the village, and try to stir the people up again. Ania's friend refuses the shake hands with her now."

Richter also alleges in her memoirs that "during the vacations we visited each other's families" and that Anna was along during visits to Lady Dorothy's relatives, and that they were honored guests at Castle Howard in Yorkshire and Naworth Castle in Cumbria.

Gisela Richter later recalled, "As was customary at that time, we were photographed together." Richter alleges that all seven friendships, "lasted all our lives."

In a conversation with Lady Dorothy Howard, Anna Abrikosova promised to mention her agricultural suggestions for Tarasovka to novelist and philosopher Leo Tolstoy, whom Anna described as, "a great friend of her family." Shortly before her permanent return to Moscow with fellow student Mabel Fawcus in November 1903, Anna was visited at Girton College by Alexandra Kropotkin, the English-born daughter of exiled Russian aristocrat-turned-anarcho-communist-leader Peter Kropotkin. Lady Dorothy Howard wrote afterwards to her mother about Alexandra Kropotkin, "she is very much like her father, Ania says."

== Marriage ==
Lady Dorothy Howard's letters make occasional references to Anna Abrikosova receiving attentions from aristocratic suitors. One was codenamed "Prince So-and-So". The other, whom Howard referred to only as "Sandro", was alleged in a letter dated January 18, 1904, either, "out of dispetto", ("spite") or having possibly, "ceased to care for Ania", to have recently become engaged to a princess and junior member of the British royal family.

According to experts, however, on the culture of the Kupechestvo ("The Russian Merchant Class") during the last decades of the House of Romanov, intermarriage between elite Moscow mercantile families and the aristocracy was widely frowned upon, as aristocratic suitors were widely presumed to be golddiggers. This would have been even more the case within Anna Abrikosova's immediate family. Her paternal grandmother had forced her 17-year old aunt, Glafira Abrikosova, into an arranged marriage to a much older member of the Russian nobility, who expected his wife to tolerate live openly on a dilapidated country estate with both her husband and his mistress. After Glafira's refusal resulted in a scandalous and almost immediate separation, Anna's adopted father, Nikolai Abrikosov, had defied his outraged mother and had taken his sister in. Nikolai Alexeievich Abrikosov then spent the next decade bribing corrupt civil service officials working in the Most Holy Synod until he finally obtained the signature of Tsar Alexander III on a document granting his sister Glafira an Orthodox ecclesiastical divorce. By that time, Glafira had studied neurology and psychology under Dr. Jean Martin Charcot in Paris, graduated from the Sorbonne University, and had become one of the first female psychologists.

Recent historians Muriel Joffe and Adele Lindenmeyr have commented that while Glafira Abrikosova, "fits Ostrovsky's stereotype of daughters sacrificed by greedy or social climbing parents, and demonstrates the legal prison that marriage could become", they also praised Glafira's rebellion and eventual victory over both her mother and her unfaithful husband as, "a plot twist not anticipated by Ostrovsky!" It is very likely, therefore, that her Aunt Glafira's experiences were among the reasons why, after Anna Abrikosova left Girton College without receiving a degree, she returned to Moscow and, rather than marrying above her station, she instead accepted a marriage proposal from her first cousin, Vladimir Abrikosov.

At the time, Anna's brother, Dmitrii Abrikosov, had become a highly ambitious diplomat and was stationed by the Foreign Office at the Russian Embassy in London, which was then located at Chesham House, Belgravia. Dmitrii Abrikosov later recalled of his sister, "She had been my closest friend during my stay in England. I was proud of her. She was a brilliant girl ..."

On the other hand, Dmitrii Abrikosov considered their cousin Vladimir to be, "a complete nonentity" and, "a young fop, constantly admiring himself in the mirror". Therefore, Dmitrii Abrikosov was horrified to learn of his sister's engagement. He later recalled, "When she wrote to me about her feelings I was horrified and promptly warned her that it was madness. I even wrote to my father asking him to stop this nonsense, but with his usual philosophy he replied that it was a law of nature for strong characters to be attracted to weaklings, because in their love there was always a touch of motherly feeling. Unimpressed, I continued my attempts to change my sister's mind, not sparing in my letters the object of her affections, with the result that one day I received a short note in which she pointed out that I had forgotten one thing, namely that she loved him. It was the end of our friendship."

During the preparation of Dmitrii Abrikosov's memoirs for publication in the early 1960s, Anna's cousin and adopted brother, Mr. Pavel Nikolaevich Abrikosov of Montreal, assisted editor George Alexander Lensen. According to Pavel Abrikosov, Anna and Vladimir, as first cousins, had difficulty obtaining an Orthodox wedding. Pavel further alleged that, in response, his adopted sister began showing interest for the first time in Catholicism, but implied that an Orthodox wedding was successfully arranged.

== Catholicism ==
The Abrikosovs spent the next decade traveling in the Kingdom of Italy, Switzerland and France. According to Dmitri Abrikosov, "For a long time we did not hear anything about them except that he was studying early Christian art."

According to Pavel Parfentiev, the former Postulator for Anna Abrikosova's Sainthood Cause, "The couple was not religious, rather to the contrary, they were free-thinkers. As Deacon Vassily puts it in his book about Blessed Leonid Feodorov, they did not directly deny God, but they did not believe in Him either. They went on about their lives without Him in them. Vladimir Abrikosov was a 'freethinker', even sympathizing with the revolutionaries, those same revolutionaries who were later the source of his sufferings for Christ. How it was that the grace of God led Anna Ivanovna to belief and to the Church, how it was that He entered her soul, will no doubt remain a mystery."

According to historian Nicolas Zernov, members of the Russian intelligentsia during the Silver Age were expected, on pain of social ostracism, to be anti-Christian. For this reason, many years later Anna Abrikosova would write, both in defense of the divinity of Jesus Christ and as a very harsh criticism of her younger self, "And when He at last definitively declared himself to be God, He placed all of His law as a binding obligation upon all mankind without exception. Once again the vice of pride and the sin of Satan were repeated upon the earth - the creation of God stood before God and denied Him. The soul refused to accept Him as He is. She preferred to select her own God for herself. In fact, she preferred to set herself in the place of God. And again we witness the worst and most terrible of sins."

During their travels throughout Western Europe, however, the Abrikosovs, who were both multilingual, were stunned as they found themselves being exposed to many intelligent fellow intellectuals who were also convinced Christians. They were equally amazed to encounter the numerical and cultural strength of the Catholic Church during the ongoing Neo-Thomistic revival and how this strength was based upon the very high level of education, rooted in both Medieval Scholasticism and Renaissance humanism, demanded since the Counter-Reformation before the ordination of Roman Catholic priests. A major role, in addition, in preparing the ground for Anna Abrikosova's conversion to Catholicism is believed to have been played by Princess Maria Mikhailovich Volkonskaya, who lived in Rome. Ambrosius Eszer, for example, believes that it was almost certainly Princess Volkonskaya who first introduced Anna Abrikosova to the Dialogue with Divine Providence by St. Catherine of Siena, from which Abrikosova was deeply struck by the phrase, "strive to follow and clothe herself with the truth." (Italian: virilmente cognoscere e seguitare la verità).

Finally, Anna Abrikosova, who had sought the meaning of life by researching and studying many different religious and philosophical systems, came to a very severe moment of crisis. Many years later Abrikosova described her mindset as follows, "Heaven is closed, God is silent, and the dull, grey days stretch forward as though I have been abandoned in a cold and dark cellar. Over there is light, and the birds are singing. In general there is a completely different life than here, but all that is not for me. I am condemned to all my days to a withering without God, without the sun, and without joy. Beyond the grave there is Purgatory stretching on and on. Perhaps there is Hell. Perhaps I am already condemned and rejected by God, and this is Hell beginning on Earth."

According to Father Georgii Friedman, Vladimir and Anna Abrikosov experienced a life-changing vision eerily reminiscent of the one described in the 37th chapter of the Book of Ezekiel, "Once during their travels in Europe, the couple was walking in the evening along the seaside at sunset, watching people strolling along. Suddenly - and simultaneously - they saw that these were not living people walking along, but dressed up skeletons. 'What is this?' they asked each other. They both saw the skeletons. The vision quickly dissolved and once again there were just ordinary people sauntering along, but the vision left a deep trace in their souls and, of course, it caused them to become more religious."

Many years later, Anna Abrikosova would write, "Gradually the soul begins to recognize the stirring of a New life within herself; abandonment, isolation, awareness of God's presence, and finally an unquenchable and burning desire for Him. Yes, first she desires, and then thirsts for the Living God. 'Give me God', she asks unceasingly of everyone she encounters on her path. It truly is as though she were in constant motion, moving and sometimes running, and ever propelled by her unquenchable thirst."

According to Father Cyril Korolevsky, "Finally, she approached the parish priest of the large, aristocratic Church of the Madeleine in Paris, Abbé Maurice Rivière, who later became Bishop of Périgueux. He instructed...her... Amazingly, especially at that time, he informed her that even though she had been received with the Latin Ritual, she would always canonically belong to the Greek-Catholic Church."

According to the parish register, Anna Abrikosova was formally received into the Catholic Church inside the Church of the Madeline's chapel of the Daughters of Charity of Saint Vincent de Paul, at 9:00 a.m. on 20 December 1908.

Following her conversion, Anna Abrikosova went on reading and came to both enjoy and prefer Dominican spirituality, particularly Jean-Baptiste Henri Lacordaire's biography of Saint Dominic, as well as the sermons of Jacques-Marie-Louis Monsabré, and the other writings of St Catherine of Siena.

Vladimir Abrikosov did not agree with his wife's conversion and, intending to strengthen his own opposition, he began attending the Russian Orthodox Divine Liturgy more frequently.

Little by little, and with the help of François-Xavier Hertzog, the Procurator General of the Suplician Order, Anna Abrikosova won her husband over to her religious convictions. On 21 December 1909, Vladimir Abrikosov was also received into the Catholic Church inside the same chapel of the Church of the Madeline wherein his wife's conversion had earlier taken place.

According to a 1925 article by their friend Kathleen West, "While visiting England in his youth M. Abrikossoff had lodged in the house of a Catholic lady. He often made fun of her faith; this she took in good part, and Mme. Abrikossoff firmly believed that her husband owed his conversion to the prayers of his hostess."

Dmitri Abrikosov later wrote about his sister and brother-in-law's conversions, "It was a great blow to our family, especially to the old generation, which considered itself a pillar of the Orthodox faith. In vain my relatives hoped that they would at least continue residing in Rome."

According to Father Korolevsky, "They both thought they would stay abroad, where they had full freedom of religion and... a vague plan to join some monastery or semi-monastic community. Since they knew that according to the canons they were Greek-Catholics, they petitioned Pius X through a Roman prelate for permission to become Roman Catholics -- they considered this a mere formality. To their great surprise the Pope refused outright... and reminded them of the provisions of Orientalium dignitas. They had just received this answer when a telegram summoned them to Moscow for family reasons."

== Moscow apostolate ==
The Abrikosovs returned to a radically changed Moscow in 1910. According to Boris Pasternak, "In the nineties, Moscow still preserved its old appearance of a fantastically picturesque provincial town with legendary features of the Third Rome or of the ancient capital city one reads about in the Russian epic poems, and with all the splendor of her forty times forty churches. Old customs were still observed."

During and after the Russian Revolution of 1905, Moscow ceased to be a city whose whole cultural life revolved around the liturgical calendar of the Russian Orthodox Church. Religious practice and Christian morality collapsed en masse and even strictly exclusive social clubs for men from the Russian nobility were transformed overnight into illegal gambling casinos and strip clubs. According to investigative journalist Vladimir Gilyarovsky, the Tsarist secret police, or Okhrana, looked the other way, as long as nothing politically subversive was said or performed onstage at the strip clubs. The Moscow city police, on the other hand, allegedly collected protection money from these same casinos and strip clubs, in return for giving the proprietors advance warning before making sham raids.

It should come as no surprise, therefore, that upon their return to such a de-Christianized and hedonistic Moscow, the now deeply religious Vladimir and Anna Abrikosov were, according to Sister Philomena Ejsmont, "heartsick on account of the plight of Russia and the Russian Church... They began their apostolic work among the intelligentsia of their former social milieu. Their prior connections in society, however, were suddenly broken off; invitations to social functions ceased and they were thus censured for their conversion and their new way of life."

Many years later, Anna Abrikosova wrote, "The more closely the soul makes Christ's thirst upon the Cross a part of her own life, the more deeply she enters into the desires of his Most Holy Heart, the more her own heart is broadened by a new thirst. Thus a thirst for the salvation of souls appears. The love of Christ grants no rest to the soul. He rouses her to bring everyone to Christ, even those most alienated from Him, and those who are most hopeless. This is the point at which great missionary vocations are born."

As there was no resident Byzantine Catholic priest in Moscow, the Abrikosovs and those fellow intellectuals whom they persuaded to enter the Catholic Church covertly attended the Tridentine Mass at St. Peter and Paul Church, Moscow, which had been built in 1829. The parish had a total of 30,000 members, of whom 10,000 were ethnic Poles. The rest were a mixture of German-, French-, Lithuanian-, and Russian-speaking parishioners. The German and Russian Catholics were being ministered to by Fr. Felix Wiercynski, a priest who had secretly concealed his membership in the Society of Jesus and entered the Russian Empire in 1904, intending, "to remain in Russia as long as possible to in order to promote the cause of Catholicism among the Orthodox". Despite his Polish surname, Fr. Wiercynski had been born at Putzig, East Prussia, where he had grown up speaking the German language as his mother tongue. He accordingly spoke the Polish language both poorly and imperfectly.

While covertly training and instructing Old Believer convert priests Frs. Mikhail Storozhev and Evstafii Susalev to take over the Russian Apostolate from him, Fr. Wiercynski never attended Byzantine Catholic Divine Liturgy offered by either priest, as he wished, "to avoid giving the impression that a Latin priest was directing the ritual affairs of the group." He also covertly organized a Marian confraternity among the Russian Catholic women of the parish.

Meanwhile, the Abrikosovs paid host whenever possible to visiting priests of the Russian Greek Catholic Church. In a February 1911 letter to Metropolitan Andrei Sheptytsky, one visiting priest, Fr. Leonid Feodorov, wrote, "About this family one can say with the words of the Apostle Paul, 'I salute the church which is in their house!' Rarely does one meet young people in the bloom of life so devoted to the work of the Church and so religious. They spread Catholicism by all means at their disposal: through acquaintances, influence, material assistance, etc. From morning to evening, the wife is busy instructing the children of the Russian Catholics; she visits acquaintances and receives them in her home with the sole purpose of converting them to Catholicism. Her husband does the same. He even confided in me his wish to become a priest and asked me to recommend the required textbooks."

Unbeknownst to Fr. Wiercynski or to the Abrikosovs, however, Fathers Evstafii and Mikhail were both informants for the Department of Spiritual Affairs within the Ministry of Internal Affairs of the Russian Empire, which was charged with surveillance of religious groups deemed "subversive" by the Tsar's Government. Ever since the Abrikosovs' return to Moscow in 1910, plainclothes Tsarist secret police agents attending Tridentine Mass at St Peter and Paul Church had noticed that a growing number of fellow attendees were making the Sign of the Cross in the Byzantine Rite manner. Both Old Believer priests had been ordered by their handlers to pretend to convert to Catholicism in order to infiltrate Moscow's Greek Catholic community as moles. As Fr. Leonid Feodorov was later correctly to suspect, Fr. Nicholas Tolstoy, the Greek Catholic priest who had previously received the poet and philosopher Vladimir Soloviev into the Catholic Church, was the third Tsarist secret police informant responsible for the crackdown that soon followed.

In 1911, Father Wiercynski was arrested by the Tsarist secret police and finally "confessed" his membership in the Jesuit Order following a very harsh interrogation. In the resulting media scandal, the Russian language press accused Fr. Wiercynski of being a Polish nationalist conspirator and of taking bribes in order to forge Catholic baptismal certificates so that Russian Jews could move outside the Pale of Settlement. Ironically, the Polish-language press in Moscow accused Father Wiercynski of being a self-hating Polish traitor who was promoting the Germanisation of his own people. Despite his insistence that he was only trying to minister to and defend the rights of the non-Polish majority at the parish, the Tsar's Government ignored Fr. Felix Wiercynski's pleas to be allowed to remain at St. Peter and Paul Church and he was coercively deported from the Russian Empire. The Jesuit Provincial in the Kingdom of Galicia and Lodomeria, however, investigated the case and ultimately declared Fr. Wiercynski exonerated of any wrongdoing.

According to Sr. Philomena Ejsmont, "When the laity turned to the pastors of the Latin Rite Catholic churches with questions about a deeper Christian life, those pastors responded, "Go to the Eastern Rite Catholics - they have an intensive religious life."

The Abrikosovs found, as well, a group of Dominican tertiaries which had been established earlier by one Natalia Rozanova. They were received into the Third Order of St. Dominic by Friar Albert Libercier, OP of the Church of St. Louis of the French in Moscow.

According to Dmitri Abrikosov, "When the Revolution was approaching, they rejoiced, saying that the Russian people were too self-indulgent, pre-occupied with material things, and that sufferings which accompany revolution would turn their minds toward higher things."

According to Hélène Iswolsky, Anna and Vladimir Abrikosova learned after the February Revolution that they had been under Tsarist secret police surveillance and that only the abdication of Tsar Nicholas II had saved them from imminent arrest.

== Community ==
On 19 May 1917, Vladimir was ordained to the priesthood by Metropolitan Andrey Sheptytsky of the Ukrainian Greek-Catholic Church. Even though the ordination of married men to the priesthood is allowed by the canon law of the Eastern Catholic Churches, the Abrikosovs had already taken a vow of chastity in a ritual which the rule of the Dominican Third Order at the time only very rarely permitted to married couples and only after first receiving the approval of "a prudent spiritual director."

On the feast of St. Dominic in August 1917, Anna took vows as a Dominican sister, assuming at that time her religious name in honor of Catherine of Siena, and founded a Greek-Catholic religious congregation of the Order in her Moscow apartment. Several of the women among the secular tertiaries joined her in taking vows as well. Thus was a community of the Dominican Third Order Regular, with Father Vladimir Abrikosov as its chaplain, established in what was soon to be Soviet Russia.

Mother Catherine took as her motto in the religious life, "Christ did not come down from the Cross, they took Him down dead."

According to Father Georgii Friedman, "In addition to the three usual religious vows, the sisters took a fourth vow, to suffer for the salvation of Russia. God heard their desire, and soon they were to suffer much, for many years."

Even though Dmitri Abrikosov dismissed the women who joined his sister's religious community as, "hysterical ladies who did not know how to occupy themselves", the community was joined by multiple women with very high levels of university education and was accordingly a center of underground education and intellectual life.

For example, Sister Dominica (Valentina Sapozhnikova), according to Nowicka, "specialized in Romance philology, especially in Dante and Medieval literature. Between 1917 and 1922, she held a university chair in Dante's poetry. She shared the beauty of Dante's poetry and the depth of his faith with the sisters and the parishioners. She also held readings of Dante in the parish."

Sister Catherine Ricci the Younger (Anastasia Selenkova), on the other hand, was a recognized expert on the Fathers of the Church. According to Anatolia Nowicka, "in the course of the two years before her arrest, she gave a series of lectures on this topic for the sisters and the parishioners. I remember that during Advent, she lectures on the incarnation and, during Lent, on redemption. She also gave lectures on the filioque question in accordance with the Fathers of the Eastern Church. Questions were encouraged and replies were given by her or the pastor".

Sister Stefania (Vera Gorodets), had been trained as both a philologist and a lawyer. She could easily read Ecclesiastical Latin and often gave weekly philosophy lectures based on her careful study of St. Thomas Aquinas and scholasticism.

During the aftermath of the October Revolution, the convent was put under surveillance by the Soviet secret police.

For the children of parishioners who did not wish to expose their children to the forced indoctrination into Marxist-Leninist atheism common in the Soviet educational system, Mother Catherine, Father Nikolai, and the sisters founded a secret and illegal Catholic school. Sister Philomena Ejsmont later recalled, "Mother Catherine loved children; they always had access to her room and simply adored her."

Sister Anatolia Nowicka confirms this, adding: "At times the sound of children's laughter and merriment came from her room. Mother knew how to devise clever, fun diversions for the children. They idolized her. The following sisters worked there: Sister Catherine Ricci (Tatiana Galkina), Sister Margaret of Hungary (Raisa Krylevskaia), Sister Dominica (Elzbieta Wachowicz), and Sister Theresa (Nadezhda Tsvetkova). They paid particular attention to the Catholic aspect of their teaching, and tried to graft into the children dedication to the Church, devotion to the Eucharist, appropriate attitudes to the Holy Mass, and respect for the priest. The children gave concerts and produced plays for the holy days."

One of the schoolchildren was Father Nikolai Alexandrov's daughter, Ekaterina Nikolaevna (née Alexandrova) Mikhailova. In a memoir written decades later, she recalled, "My entire childhood was spent within this community, at 23 Prechistenskii Boulevard, Apartment 34. It was a huge apartment. There was a chapel in one room and there was also a convent. During the day, it looked like any well-appointed apartment with a living room, kitchen, and everything else; but at night, at least thirty nuns were staying there. They all slept on the floor. But at that time, I did not know this. The atmosphere in the community was friendly, with everyone being hard workers and no one being forced to do anything against her will. We were like all other children, fed and cared for. For every New Year, wonderful festivities were arranged, with costume parties and skits. Quite a lot of people used to come. There was a rather large circle of laypeople, besides the nuns. There were about ten or twelve children."

During the Russian famine of 1921-1922, a request for assistance from Patriarch Tikhon of Moscow to Pope Benedict XV was answered only through Cardinal Pietro Gasparri. According to a letter from Mother Catherine to Princess Volkonskaya, the Patriarch was deeply hurt by this, "and his kindness to us has been dampened."

Mother Catherine was even more concerned when she learned in March 1922 that Edmund A. Walsh, an Irish-American Jesuit priest from Boston, would be directing the Papal Aid Mission. In a letter to Rome, she was almost certainly thinking of the arrest and deportation of Fr. Felix Wiercynski when she wrote, "Does Rome realize the terror and revulsion felt here until recently towards the Jesuits and the strange mood in which their arrival is awaited? It is something inexplicable, a characteristic trait of panic. If the Jesuits enter Russia in civilian dress, it will mean only the worst: their arrival here will be considered a giant Catholic conspiracy. One must thoroughly understand the psychology of the Russian attitude toward the Jesuits. In spite of my entire respect for this religious order, I must admit that it must not enter Russia. Its arrival here will be the ruin of all that has been accomplished."

On the night of 17 August 1922, the GPU raided the convent during Orthros. Father Vladimir Abrikosov, along with his protege and former Old Bolshevik Dmitry Kuzmin-Karavayev, were arrested and sentenced to the supreme penalty of death by shooting. The sentence, however, was commuted to perpetual exile and deportation to the West aboard the Philosopher's Ship. According to Lesley Chamberlain, every person deported aboard the ship had been hand-picked by Vladimir Lenin, who wished to rid himself of the first Soviet dissidents and who viewed Father Vladimir as the most dangerous of those whom he expelled.

Soon after, Mother Catherine and her mother-in-law were offered the opportunity to leave the Soviet Union and join Father Vladimir as White emigres in Paris. Mother Catherine declined and wrote in a letter, "I wish to live a uniquely supernatural life and to accomplish to the end my vow of immolation for the priests and for Russia."

Mother Catherine wrote Princess Volkonskaya a letter from Moscow, "I am, in the fullest sense of the word, alone with half naked children, with sisters who are wearing themselves out, with a youthful, wonderful, saintly but terribly young priest, Father Nikolai Alexandrov, who himself needs support, and with parishioners dismayed and bewildered, while I myself am waiting to be arrested, because when they searched here, they took away our Constitution and our rules."

== Gulag ==
In a 16 November 1923 letter to the British Foreign Office, Fr. Walsh described the recent joint GPU and Red Army nighttime raid upon the Moscow Byzantine Rite Dominican convent and illegal Catholic school led by Mother Catherine, followed in the early morning by the arrest of the mother prioress and the sisters. Walsh also described the simultaneous raids and mass arrests of the priests and laity of the Russian Greek Catholic Church throughout Moscow. A copy of Walsh's letter was acquired by the U.S. State Department and landed across the desk of U.S. Secretary of State Charles Evans Hughes, who was still keeping a very close watch over religious persecution in the Soviet Union. Therefore, Walsh's letter very likely played a role in Hughes' continued decision to refuse to grant diplomatic recognition to the U.S.S.R.

According to the 1924 "Investigatory File of A.I. Abrikosova and Others" in the Central Archive of the FSB, the OGPU decided to interpret the convent and its tiny parochial school as a terrorist organization plotting to overthrow the Soviet Government and, "the organization of illegal schools for the education of children in a religious-fascist spirit". The nuns' co-conspirators were alleged to be the Holy See, the Republic of Lithuania, the Second Polish Republic, exiled Ukrainian People's Republic leader Symon Petliura, Metropolitan Andrey Sheptytsky of the Ukrainian Catholic Church, the Grand Duke Kiril Vladimirovich and the House of Romanov Government-in-Exile, "the Supreme Monarchist Council", and, "International Fascism."

Shortly before the Supreme Collegium of the OGPU handed down sentences, Mother Catherine told the sisters of her community, "Probably every one of you, having given your love to God and following in His way, has in your heart more than once asked Christ to grant you the opportunity to share in His sufferings. And so it is; the moment has now arrived. Your desire to suffer for His sake is now being fulfilled."

Mother Catherine was sentenced to ten years of solitary confinement and imprisoned at Yaroslavl from 1924 to 1932. After being diagnosed with breast cancer, she was transferred to Butyrka Prison infirmary for an operation in May 1932. The operation removed her left breast, part of the muscles on her back and side. She was left unable to use her left arm, but was deemed cancer free.

== Release ==
Meanwhile, Ekaterina Peshkova, the wife of author Maxim Gorky and head of the Political Red Cross, had interceded with Stalin to secure her release and grounds of her illness and that her sentence was almost complete.

On August 13, 1932, Mother Catherine petitioned to be returned to Yaroslavl. Instead, she was told that she could leave any time she wanted. On August 14, she walked free from Butyrka and went directly to the Church of St. Louis des Français.

Bishop Pie Eugène Neveu, who had been secretly consecrated by Michel d'Herbigny as an underground Bishop in 1926, wrote to Rome after meeting her at St. Louis des Français, "This woman is a genuine preacher of the Faith and very courageous. One feels insignificant beside someone of this moral stature. She still cannot see well, and she can only use her right hand, since the left is paralyzed."

According to Dmitrii Abrikosov, "As for my sister, nothing was heard about her for nine years and even my eldest brother, who worked for the Soviets and became a prominent scientist, could do nothing for her. Then suddenly she reappeared in Moscow. Relatives who saw her wrote to my aunt in Paris that she gave the impression of a Saint."

Despite warnings that it could lead to another arrest, Mother Catherine also reestablished ties to the surviving sisters. She later told interrogators, "After my release from the isolator and happening to be in Moscow, I renewed my links with a group of people whom an OGPU Collegium had condemned in 1923. In reestablishing contact with them, my purpose was to assess their political and spiritual condition after their arrest, administrative exile and the expiration of their residence restriction. Following my meetings with them, I became convinced that they retained their earlier world outlook."

== Rearrest ==
After immediately entering communication with the surviving sisters of the congregation, Mother Catherine was arrested, along with 24 other Catholics, in August 1933. In what the NKVD called "The Case of the Counterrevolutionary Terrorist-Monarchist Organization", Mother Catherine and her fellow nuns stood accused of forming a "terrorist organization", plotting to assassinate Joseph Stalin, overthrow the Communist Party of the Soviet Union, and restore the House of Romanov as a constitutional monarchy in concert with "international fascism" and "Papal theocracy". It was further alleged that the nuns planned to restore Capitalism and for collective farms to be privatized and returned to the kulaks and the Russian nobility. The NKVD further alleged that the nuns' terrorist activities were directed by Bishop Pie Eugène Neveu, the Vatican's Congregation for the Oriental Churches, and Pope Pius XI. After being declared guilty as charged, Mother Catherine was returned to the Political Isolator Prison at Yaroslavl.

== Death and legacy ==
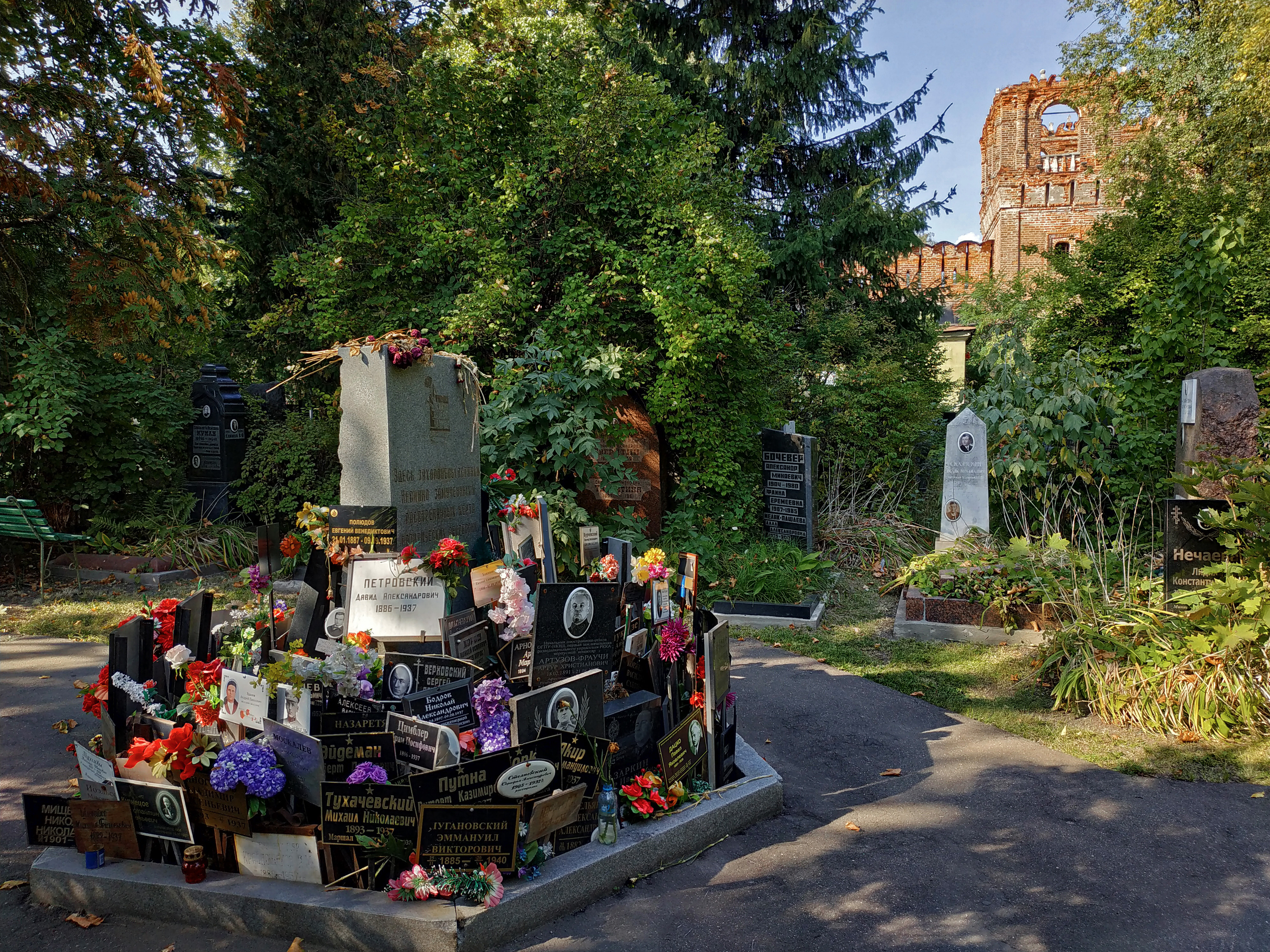
Anna Abrikosova's burial place; "Common Grave Number 1" at Donskoy Cemetery.

Abrikosova died of spinal cancer based in the sacral bone inside Butyrka Prison infirmary on July 23, 1936, and at the age of only 54 years of age. After being autopsied, her body was secretly cremated by the NKVD at the Donskoy Cemetery in central Moscow and her ashes were buried in a mass grave at the same location.

According to Dmitrii Abrikosov, "Till her last moments she never thought of herself, and tried to help and support by her faith other unfortunate prisoners. Such is the fate of this remarkable woman. When I was in Japan, some Catholic told me that he had read in a Catholic magazine that the Church was collecting all data on her life with a view to possibly consecrating her as a Saint of the Catholic Church. How destiny plays with human life! ... - who could have believed all this possible, had anyone prophesied it? My sister herself would have called it the dream of a madman."

When news of Anna Abrikosova's death reached the large community of anti-communist Russians in Paris, an obituary was written in French by Hélène Iswolsky and published in l'Année Dominicaine.

About Mother Catherine and the sisters, Bishop Neveu wrote in a dispatch to the Holy See, "They were heroines deserving our admiration... [and they have] added a glorious page to the history of our Holy Mother Church."

After her release from the Gulag in 1953, Abrikosova Dominican Sister Theresa Kugel became the driving force in the reunion of the surviving sisters and their monastic revival inside a Khrushchyovka apartment building on Dzuku Street in Vilnius. Georgii Davidovich Friedman, a Soviet Jewish jazz musician and recent Catholic convert, first visited them in 1974. He found that the sisters were being ministered to, under orders from the Master of the Order of Preachers Aniceto Fernández Alonso, by Dominican priests visiting from the People's Republic of Poland and by Volodymyr Prokopiv, a graduate of the Russicum, fellow Gulag survivor, and priest of the illegal and underground Ukrainian Greek Catholic Church.

Friedman later recalled, "I remember how the atmosphere of quiet and peace in their quarters delighted me. On the walls hung large images of Saint Dominic and Saint Catherine of Siena. In the tiniest little chapel they had made an altar out of a dresser, and on the altar stood a crucifix. A lamp flickered in a beautiful vessel to show that the Blessed Sacrament was reserved there."

Also according to Georgii Friedman, the surviving Sisters had acquired from their visiting chaplains an exceptionally rare and precious copy of the Greek-Catholic Horologion (Часocлoвъ, or "Chasoslov") in Old Church Slavonic, which they used unfailingly for chanting communal prayers for Orthros, Vespers, and All Night Vigil. The surviving Sisters also prayed both the rosary and the Stations of the Cross.

After careful screening, the surviving sisters arranged in the late 1970s for Georgii Friedman to be accepted into a strictly illegal major seminary in Western Ukraine. In 1979, he was secretly ordained to the priesthood by an underground Bishop of the Ukrainian Greek Catholic Church. Father Georgii thus became the first Russian Greek Catholic priest in the USSR since the 1930s.

Following the collapse of the Soviet Union in 1991, Father Georgii Friedman and his fellow Russian Catholics, most of whom were directly linked to the surviving Abrikosov Dominican Sisters, began to cautiously appear in the open. At the same time, the history and martyrology of the Russian Greek Catholic Church under the Bolshevik Yoke began to be investigated.

In 2001, Exarch Leonid Feodorov was beatified during a ceremony held in Lviv by Pope John Paul II.

In 2003, the Causes for Beatification of six Soviet-era martyrs and confessors of the Russian Greek Catholic Church: Fabijan Abrantovich, Anna Abrikosova, Igor Akulov, Potapy Emelianov, Halina Jętkiewicz, and Andrzej Cikoto, were submitted to the Holy See's Congregation for the Causes of Saints by the Bishops of the Catholic Church in Russia.

== Samizdat writings ==
While writing about her memories of the time before the arrest of the community, Sister Philomena Ejsmont recalled the sisters' involvement in preaching the Catholic Faith to the Russian people through the medium of Samizdat, "In addition to her daily prayers and obligations, Mother Catherine still found time to translate spiritual texts - masterpieces of ascetic literature - into Russian for those sisters who did not know foreign languages. She herself wrote some meditations based on the liturgical year and Dominican feast days."

According to Anatolia Nowicka: "A number of the sisters were engaged in the translation into Russian of the Lives of the great Dominican saints as well as those of other Orders. They also translated Tanquerey, Bossuet, Lacordaire, Gibar, and other Catholic authors. The translations were done in several copies and collected in the parish and Order library. All this ended up in the archives of the GPU when the Chapter was liquidated. But the sisters work was not lost, for many got a Catholic training from it as those handwritten pages passed from hand to hand. Also those of other faiths began to take deeper interest in religious problems after being exposed to the sisters' readings and translations."

In her work as a literary translator, Anna Abrikosova translated Jean-Baptiste Henri Lacordaire's biography of St. Dominic from French to Russian. Her translation was published anonymously in 1916 and was republished after the collapse of the Soviet Union in 1991.

Despite Mgr. Robert Hugh Benson's subtle contempt for the Eastern Catholic Churches and "Greek Christianity", Anna Abrikosova also translated his dystopian novel Lord of the World from English to Russian shortly before the Bolshevik Revolution. This translation, however, remained unpublished and is now considered to be lost.

As was often the case with those whom they arrested before the Khrushchev thaw, the Soviet secret police chose to charge the Abrikosov sisters with being a terrorist organization with the covert backing of the Vatican and western foreign intelligence services and who were plotting the assassination of Joseph Stalin as a decapitation strike, followed by violent regime change. In reality, the influence of Monsignor Benson's dystopian novel may be seen in the following statement from an 11 February 1923 letter by Mother Catherine Abrikosova, "Holy Communion and the rosary - these are the two means of victory - nothing else is needed. An ardent spiritual life, a pure faith, and an iron will - i.e., a love that demands nothing, but yields everything."

Also according to Anatolia Nowicka, "Our Mother Superior translated mainly the works of Dominican authors, such as the Regulations of the Third Order of St. Dominic, The Life of St. Catherine of Siena, the 'Litany to St Dominic and to other Dominican Saints. Her own spiritual works were mainly Meditations for the sisters, to be used during retreats. I have read them, and they exerted an indelible impression on me. I was astonished at how a woman who did not have any special theological training could write so simply, clearly, and inspiringly about the most delicate and profound manifestations of spiritual life. Mother Anna Ivanovna was also able to understand the needs and psychological difficulties of contemporary men and women. Among her Meditations, I remember The Last Words of Christ on the Cross, The Mass of St. Dominic, The Patronage of the Mother of God, [and] Go and Teach."

According to Father Georgii Friedman, "The only composition of Mother Catherine that survived intact is The Seven Words of Christ on the Cross. It was not an exact copy that was preserved, but what we have gives us an idea of the very lofty spirituality of the author. I would even be so bold as to say that the level of this work is no less than the writings of Saint Theresa of Avila. Especially in The Third Word one can see the personal, burning pain of voluntary suffering borne by Mother Catherine - the renunciation, and then even the separation from, her ardently loved spouse. This work became, as it were, the spiritual-sacrificial program for the sisters' life in her community."

== Quotes ==
- "I wish to lead a uniquely supernatural life and to accomplish to the end my vow of immolation for the priests and for Russia."
- "Soviet youth cannot talk about its world outlook; it is blinkered. It is developing too one-sidedly, because it knows only the jargon of Marxist-Leninism."
- "A political and spiritual outlook should develop only on the basis of a free critical exploration of all the facets of philosophical and political thought."
