= Anna Crone =

American linguist and literary theorist (1946–2009)

- Anna Lisa Crone
- Born: June 9, 1946
- Died: 19 June 2009 (aged 63)
- Education: Harvard University
- Awards: Quantrell Award
- Scientific career
- Fields: Slavic languages and literatures
- Workplaces: University of Chicago
- Doctoral advisor: Vsevolod Setchkarev

Anna Lisa Crone (June 9, 1946 – June 19, 2009) was an American linguist and literary theorist.

== Life ==
Bom in Brooklyn, New York, Crone was raised in North Carolina and graduated from Goucher College in 1967. She received her Ph.D. from Harvard University in 1975, where her teachers were Roman Jakobson, Kirill Taranovsky, and Vsevolod Setchkarev. She entered the University of Chicago two years later (1977) and began working as Professor of Slavic Languages and Literatures. Her first monograph was published in 1978 and devoted to a study of the Russian philosopher Vasilii Rozanov. Robert Bird, Chairman of the Department of Slavic Languages and Literatures at the University of Chicago, called the book a new chapter in the study of Russian philosophical discourse. Her final years were dedicated to a monograph on the philosophies of eros in Russian modernism. This book, entitled Eros and Creativity in Russian Religious Renewal: The Philosophers and the Freudians (2010), focuses on four brilliant representatives of the "Russian Religious Renaissance" of the late nineteenth and early twentieth centuries—Vladimir Solovyov, Vasily Rozanov, Nikolai Berdyaev, and Boris Vysheslavtsev. In trying to situate these thinkers in a European philosophical context, Crone investigated their connection to Freudian theory, with their views being sometimes misinterpreted by Crone.

During her career she directed almost 20 dissertations. In 2007, two of her students published Poetics, Self, Place: Essays in Honor of Anna Lisa Crone. She died from cancer and was survived by her husband Vladimir Donchik, her daughter Liliana, her parents Ethel and James Crone, and sisters Laurel Sneed and Moira Crone.

== Awards and honors ==
- 1985: a Quantrell Award for Excellence in Undergraduate Teaching at the university
- 2000: Award for Achievement in Post-Secondary Teaching (the American Association of Teachers of Slavic and East European Languages)
- 2000: a Faculty Award for Excellence in Graduate Teaching (University of Chicago)
