= Merchant guild (Russian Empire) =

Merchants' organization in the Russian Empire

Merchant guild (Russian: купеческая гильдия) was a form of organization of merchants in the Russian Empire. Since the late 18th century, membership in a guild was virtually compulsory for a trader to have the formal status of merchant. The guild system ended formally in 1917.

== Development ==
In the Kievan Rus, people involved in trade were traditionally referred to by three names: gosti (literally, guests), i.e. wealthy powerful merchants involved in international trade or foreign merchants; kuptsy (literally, merchants), i.e. any local merchant, and torgovtsy (literally, traders), i.e. small dealers in commodities.

In the second half of the 16th century, the traders and merchants of the Russian cities were collectively named posadskie lyudi, i.e. people residing at the posad, outskirts of towns, outside the city walls. By the late 1500s, Russian merchants were organized in three groups: gosti, trading people of the gostinnaya sotnya (literally: the guests' hundred) and the sukonnaya sotnya (mercers' hundred).

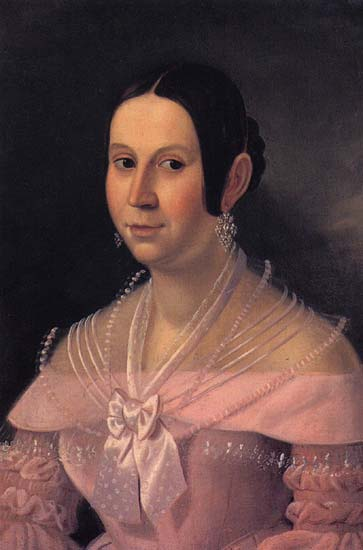
Agrippina Perlova, wife of Ivan Alekseevich Perlov (1794-1861), hereditary honorary citizen, merchant of the 1st guild, founder of a famous tea company.

The first attempts to organize traders in hierarchical system were made by Peter the Great. In the 1720s, the posadskie lyudi involved in trade obtained the new collective name of 'kuptsy'. The rank of kuptsy now included gosti who previously did not belong to the posad.

On January 16, 1721, the Chief Magistrate of the Russian Empire, established two guilds: 1) bankers, merchants, major traders, city physicians, pharmacists, gold and silver jewellers, icon painters and artists; 2) small traders and craftsmen. In 1742 the term podlye lyudi (those who did not have formal town membership, and, thus, did not pay town taxes, 'irregular dealers') was replaced by the 3rd merchant guild. Now they were included in the tax system of towns.

According to the Commission of Commerce, in the 1760s, the 3rd guild made the majority (68.2%), the 2nd guild made 24.7%, and the 1st guild — 7.1%.

Until 1775, there was no particular capital rate for each guild.

The Manifesto of March 17, 1775, had finally confirmed the three merchant guilds, liberated merchants in the entire empire from capitation and separated them from the rest of city residents. The Manifesto required the fee of minimum 500 Rubles to acquire the status of merchant and 1% tax of the stated capital. Merchants entered a certain guild according to the stated capital.

In the 18th-century Russia, the activity of a merchant was called commerce, which implied a wide range of spheres: from banking and manufacturing to trading.

Minimal capital rate for each guild
	Minimal capital (Rubles)			
Guild	1775	1785	1794	1807
1st	10,000	10,000	16,000	50,000
2nd	1000	5000	8000	20,000
3rd	500	1000	2000	8000

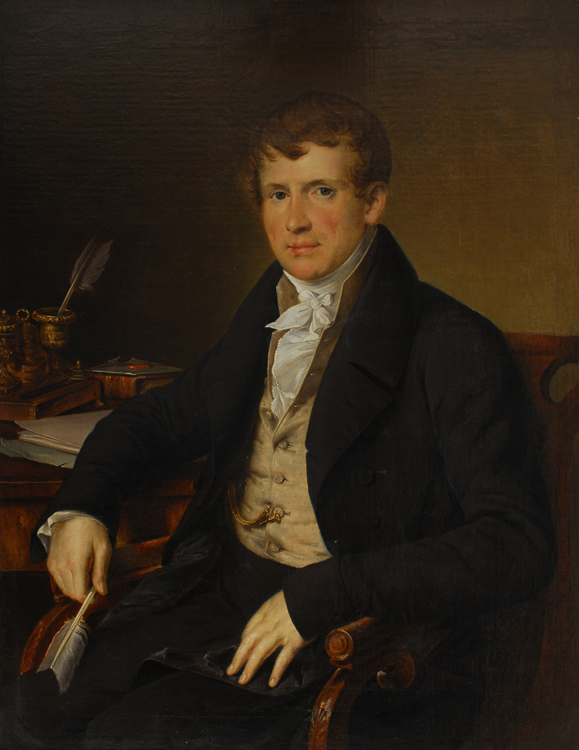
Diomid Kiselev (1788-1831), merchant of the 1st guild, the son of a textile millionaire and former serf.

The right to enter a guild was limited to men. Only the male member of the family who acquired a merchant certificate was considered to be a merchant. All the rest were assigned to him as 'merchant relatives' (merchant wife, merchant son, merchant brother, etc.) until he ceased being in the guild. Widows of merchants returned to their previous estate, if not held the membership in a guild on their own; they were referred to as 'merchant widows'. They were disallowed remarrying into a different estate if their late husband's debts had not been paid. Adult children of merchants had to enter a guild on their own.

The Decree of the Russian Senate from September 19, 1776, liberated guild merchants from military recruitment for paying 360 Rubles per recruit.

The Charter of the Towns of 1785 introduced the new title for merchants who stated capital of over 50,000 Rubles. Now they were named 'eminent (or notable) citizens' (imenitye grazhdane). Genealogies of eminent merchants were recorded in special velvet books. Merchants of the 1st and the 2nd guilds were freed from corporal punishment.

The Royal Decree of 1786 required merchants to relocate to towns. This brought about the need to issue special certificates confirming a merchant's status. Merchant certificates were issued from November 1 through January 1 annually and were valid until January 1 of the next year. If merchants were late to obtain the certificate they were returned to the class of meshchane (burgers), while they were allowed to get the merchant status back during the year.

In 1804 the merchants of the 1st guild whose company had existed for at least 100 years had the right to claim nobility.

In 1797 the guild tax was raised to 1.25%, in 1810 to 1.75%, in 1812 to 4.75%, in 1818 to 5.225%. In 1824 the tax was lowered to 4% for the 1st and 2nd guilds, and 2.5% for the 3rd guild.

In 1800 the government established the rank of Councillor of Commerce (Kommerts-Sovietnik) that was equal to the 8th civil class in the Table of Ranks. Since 1832, this rank gave the right for hereditary nobility.

In 1863 the guild tax and the 3rd guild were abolished. Since that year all members of a merchant's family had the right for the status of merchant.

In 1885 the Russian government introduced the profit tax for the guild merchants: 3% of profit in 1885, 5% — in 1892.

The guilds were annulled on November 11 (24), 1917, by the decree "On abolition of social estates and civil ranks" of the All-Russian Central Executive Committee.

== Rights and privileges ==
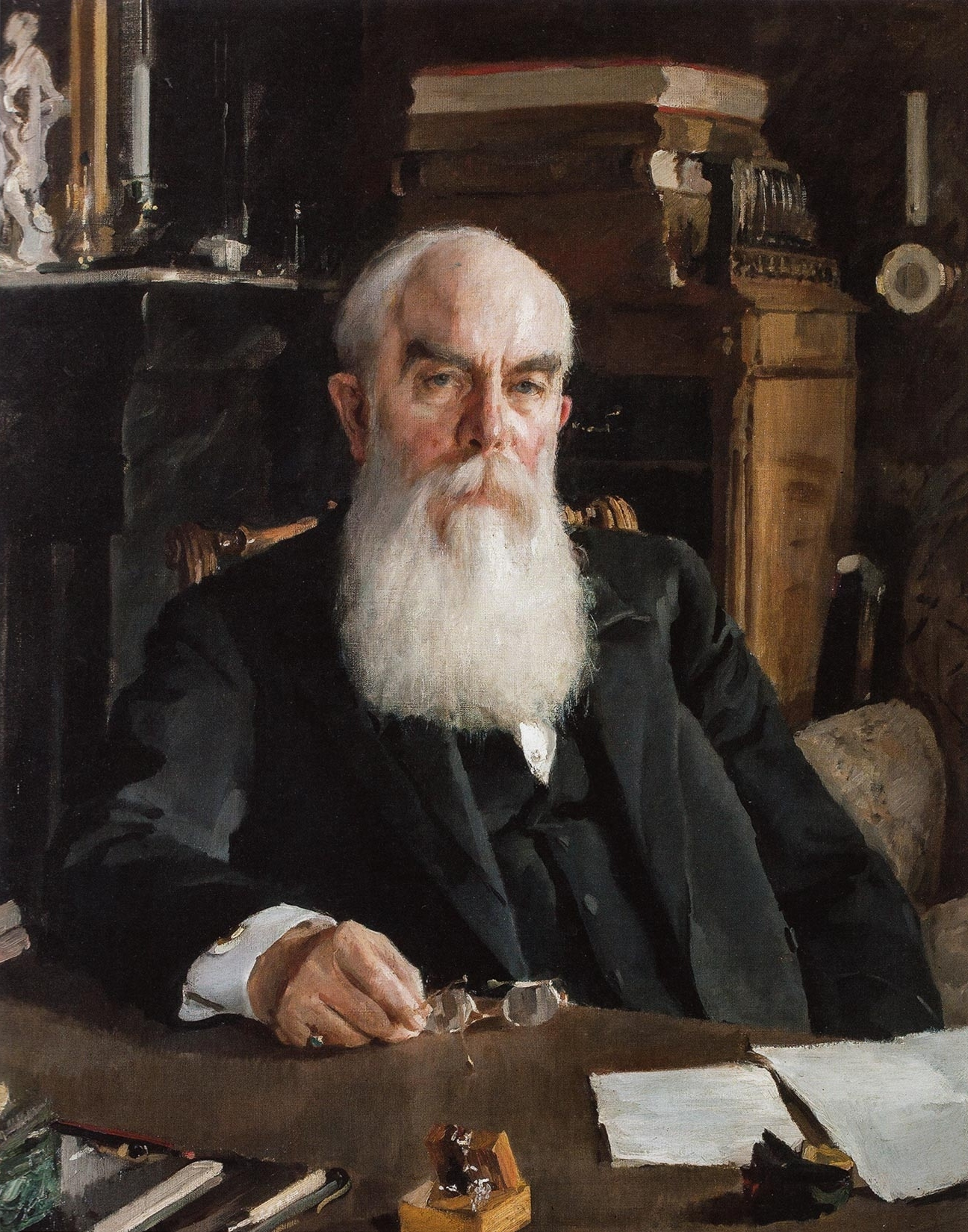
Alksey Abrikosov, the founder of the famous confectionary company, now called "Babayevsky", merchant of the 1st guild, councillor of commerce.

=== 1st guild ===
Merchants of the 1st guild were allowed domestic and international trade, owning factories and plants, river and sea vessels. They were privileged to ride in a coach drawn by a pair of horses. Merchants of the 1st guild were allowed being city mayors and bank directors. Since 1863 the 1st guild implied international and wholesale trade.

The merchants of the 1st guild were allowed to carry swords and sabres and wear the formal attire of the governorate.

Since 1824 this guild's members were allowed receiving the rank of Councillor of Commerce after 12 years.

=== 2nd guild ===
Merchants of the 2nd guild were allowed domestic trade, owning factories and plants and river vessels. They had the right to ride barouches drawn by two horses. The merchants of the 2nd guild were allowed being burgomasters and ratmans. Since 1863, this guild implied only retail, and the procurement was limited to 15,000 rubles.

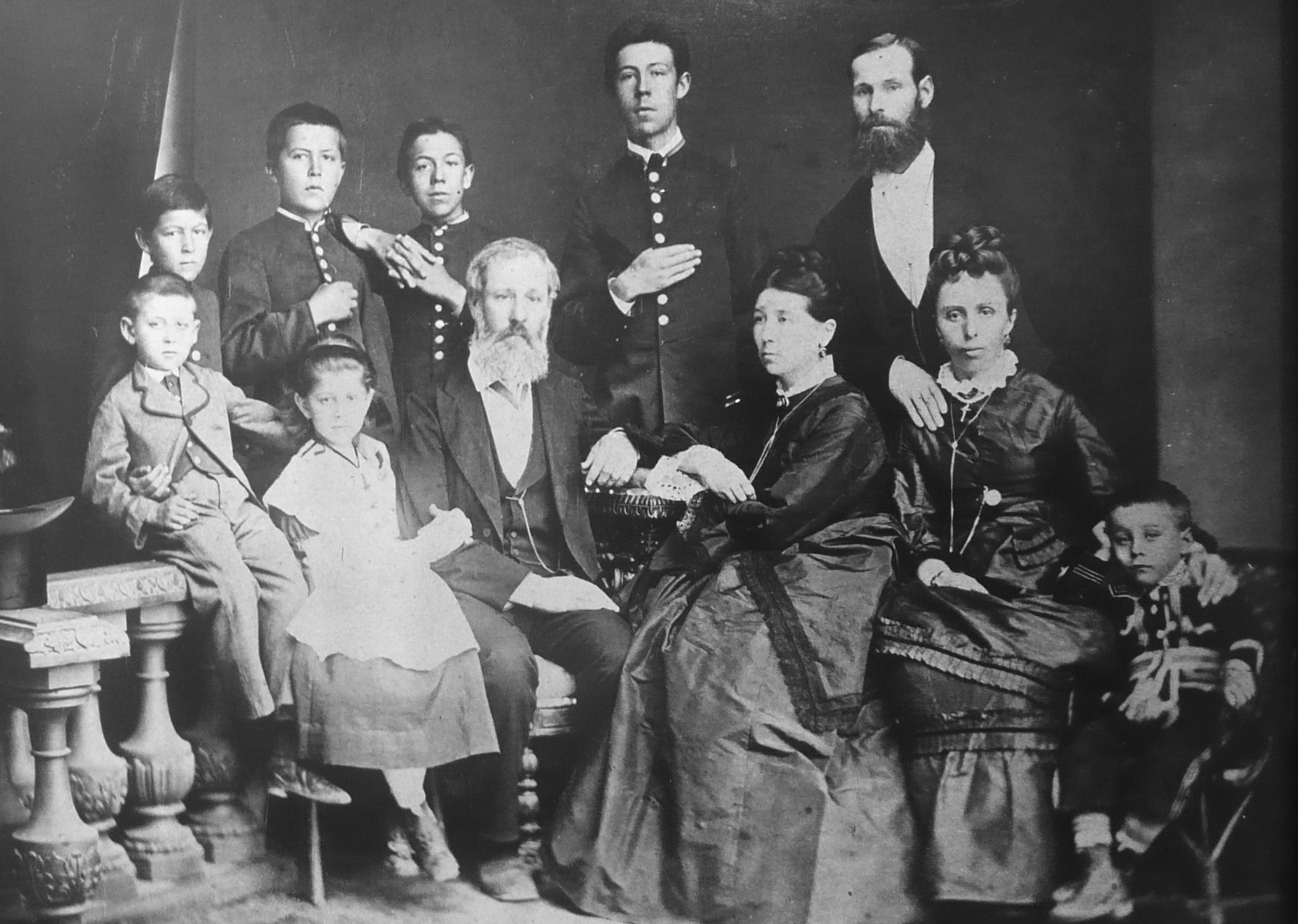
Anton Chekhov's father, Pavel Egorovich Chekhov, a merchant of the 3rd guild, owner of a tea shop, and his family. Taganrog, 1874.

=== 3rd guild ===
Merchants of the 3rd guild were allowed retail sales in towns and districts, transporting commodities for sales by land and water, owning workshops, small river vessels, taverns and inns. Merchants of the 3rd guild were allowed to own maximum three shops and hire up to 30 employees. They could ride in carriages, except for coaches, drawn by maximum one horse. This category of merchants was allowed being city starostas and deputies.

This guild was abolished in 1863.

=== Honorary citizens ===
The merchants who had the title of honorary citizens were allowed riding coaches drawn by four horses, owning country houses with gardens. Non-merchant honorary citizens and those of them who belonged to the 2nd guild were also allowed establishing factories and plants, and owning river and sea vessels. Honorary citizenship freed a person from corporal punishment (abolished in 1863 for all subjects of the empire. The grandchildren of prominent citizens had the right to apply to the Heraldic Commission of the Senate for hereditary nobility when they came of age. The status of prominent citizen was replaced by that of honorary citizen by the manifesto of Nicholas II of April 10, 1832.

== Social aspects ==
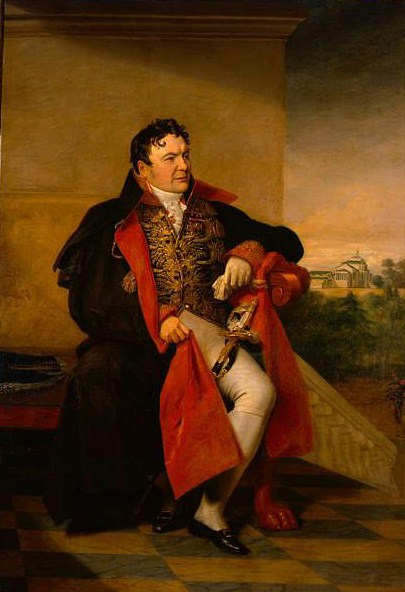
Vsevolod Vsevolozhsky, (1769-1836) an aristocrat, merchant of the 1st guild.

Despite the popular idea of Russian merchants as a certain class or social estate, many Russian historians insist on that merchants, unlike, say, nobility or peasants, in the Russian Empire were a status, rather than a social estate. This viewpoint is supported by the fact that the status of merchant was temporary and uninherited, lasting for as long as a person was a member of a merchant guild. Therefore, merchant guilds were open to people from all of the social estates. Despite the common socio-cultural stereotype of a Russian merchant, it was indeed a very diverse class.

Up until the 18th century, the word kupyechestvo in Russia was used to refer to commercial activity rather than a certain social class, while traders were not a particular social estate. Until 1775, the merchant guilds were organized according to occupation, rather than financial standing. The reform of 1775—1785 had changed the situation. Since 1775, the merchant guilds were divided by the financial principle. This has resulted in many former merchants losing the status.

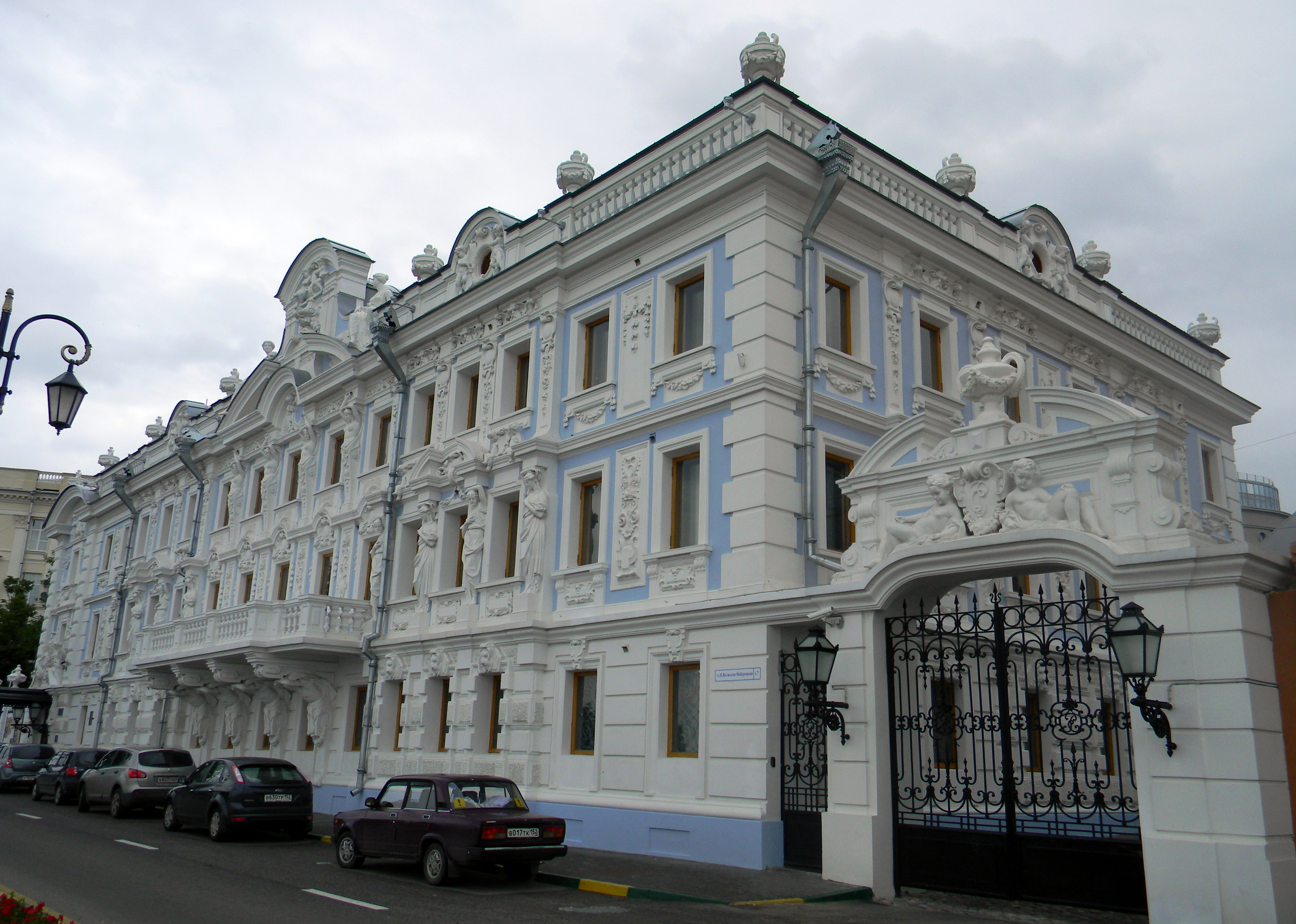
Mansion of merchant Sergey Mikhailovich Rukovishnikov in Nizhny Novgorod

The commercial activity in the 18th-century Russia was carried out by people from different estates, including nobility. In the 1760s, some merchants attempted to initiate ban on owning factories and plants by nobility. Part of merchants of that period supported the idea of bonding serfs to factories, thus, making themselves more equal to landed gentry. Merchants claimed the right to purchase inhabited villages and attach them to factories. In general, in the 1760 — 1770s, Russian merchants supported the idea of equal exploitation of labor with landed gentry (whether in form of serfdom or free labor). But in the 1780s, Russian mercers began to advocate for abolition of serfdom, due to rapid development of their industry.

During the 18th century, Russian city merchants actively struggled for equality with nobility.

Traditionally, Russian nobility was involved with commerce. But in the 18th century, the commercial activity of upper aristocracy had resulted in the government's restricting their right to get engaged in business. The Charter of the Towns (1785) allowed all free subjects of the empire to enter the merchant guilds. In 1790 Catherine the Great prohibited nobility to enter merchant guilds. So, she disallowed General Stepan Apraksin to enter the 1st guild. However, she did not object nobility's involvement in manufacturing. In that period most of nobility's business activity focused on factories on their own estates.

Landed gentry that had degraded to the class of odnodvortsy or changed the social estate by their will was not counted. That is, people with noble background made a larger number than is traditionally believed. By the late 18th century, not all of the Russian landed gentry had made it to the new class of dvorianstvo, while some in the class were those ennobled during the first decade of the Russian Empire.

In 1812 the Russian government established a special status for 'trading peasants', who did not have to enter a merchant guild. Many burgers traded without being members of a guild. The Manifesto from January 1, 1807, allowed landed gentry to enter the 1st and the 2nd guild. In 1827 nobility was allowed to enter the 3rd guild, as well. In 1812, the so-called trading burgers were obliged to acquire special 'entrepreneur's certificates' (promyslovye svidetelstva). This category existed until 1827.
