= Nikolai Alexandrov =

Nikolai Alexandrov may refer to:

- Nikolai Alexandrov (actor) (1870–1930), Russian stage actor, theatre director and drama teacher
- Nikolai Alexandrov (priest) (1884–1936), Russian Greek-Catholic priest
