= Latin Rite =

Latin Rite may refer to:

- The Latin Church, a sui iuris church of the Catholic Church
- The Latin liturgical rites, a family of Christian rites and uses which includes the Roman Rite
- The Roman Rite, a Latin liturgical rite practiced in the Latin Church, particularly in reference to its celebration in Latin
- The Pre-Tridentine Mass, the pre-Reformation celebration of Mass in the Latin liturgical rites, distinguished from Protestant liturgies
- Western Rite Orthodoxy

== See also ==
- Liturgical use of Latin
- Latin Mass (disambiguation)
