= Boris Vysheslavtsev =

Russian philosopher (1877–1954)

- Born: Boris Petrovich Vysheslavtsev; October 1877; Moscow, Russian Empire
- Died: October 5, 1954 (aged 76); Geneva, Switzerland
- Era: 20th-century philosophy
- Region: Russian philosophy
- School: Russian Religious Renaissance

Boris Petrovich Vysheslavtsev (Russian: Бори́с Петро́вич Вышесла́вцев; 1877– October 5, 1954) was a Russian philosopher who belonged to the Russian Silver Age and Renaissance of Religion and Philosophy.

== Life ==
He did his doctorate on Fichte in 1914 and became a lecturer, later professor in the philosophy of law at Moscow University. In September 1922, he became one of a group of prominent writers, scholars and intellectuals who were sent into forced exile on the so-called "philosophers' ships". He emigrated first to Berlin, then in 1924 to Paris. He spent most of his life at the Orthodox Theological Institute. While in Paris, he published the book The Ethics of a Transfigured Eros (1931). This book deals with the Christianisation of Freudian sublimation and is universally considered Vysheslavtsev's best work. He is noted for an attempt to apply concepts of depth psychology to ethics and to the interpretation of Christian doctrine.

During World War II, Vysheslavtsev collaborated with the Nazis, helping them write anti-Soviet propaganda. After the war, he fled to Switzerland to avoid prosecution.

== Books ==
Available in English translation:

- The Eternal in Russian Philosophy. Translated by Penelope V. Burt. Grand Rapids, MI, and Cambridge, U.K.: Eerdmans, 2002.
