= Ilya Fondaminsky =

Russian author and political activist

- Илья Фондаминский
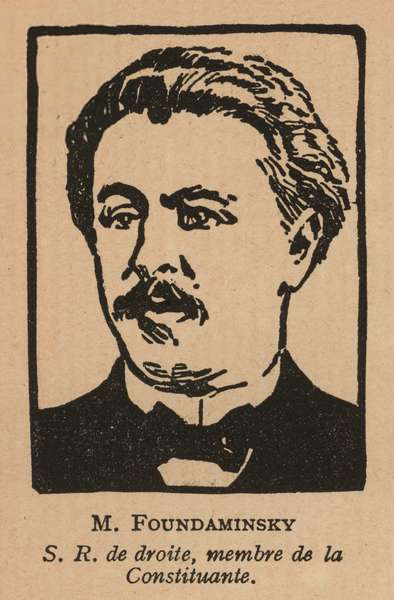
- Portrait by Boris Zvorykine published in Histoire des Soviets, 1922

Member of the Russian Constituent Assembly
- In office 25 November 1917 – 20 January 1918 (Note: The Constituent Assembly was declared dissolved by the Bolshevik-Left SR Soviet government, rendering the end the term served.)
- Preceded by: Constituency established
- Succeeded by: Constituency abolished
- Constituency: Black Sea Fleet

Personal details
- Born: Илья Исидорович Фондаминский; February 17, 1880 Moscow, Moskovsky Uyezd, Moscow Governorate, Russian Empire
- Died: November 19, 1942 (aged 62) Auschwitz, Gau Upper Silesia, Nazi Germany
- Party: Socialist Revolutionary Party
- Occupation: Writer, political activist, editor, philanthropist
- Nickname: I. Bunakov

Ilya Isidorovich Fondaminsky (Russian: Илья Исидорович Фондаминский; February 17, 1880, — November 19, 1942), was a Russian author (writing under the pseudonym I. Bunakov) and political activist. In the 1910s he was one of the leaders of the Socialist Revolutionary Party, and in 1917 he was a senior member of Alexander Kerensky's Provisional government, serving as a commissar in the Black Sea Fleet.

In 1918, Fondaminsky took part in the Jassy Conference. In Paris, where he had been living since 1919, Fondaminsky veered off from the left and became an influential newspaper editor (Sovremennye Zapisky, among others), author of philosophical essays and in the later years — much admired philanthropist, supporting Christian magazines and charity funds. In his biography of Mother Maria Skobtsova, Pearl of Great Price, Father Serge Hackel wrote that Fondaminsky gave occasional lectures at the Sunday afternoon gatherings at the house on the Rue de Lourmel.

Facing the Nazi occupation, Fondaminsky refused to leave Paris, saying he would accept his destiny whatever it would be. Arrested in July 1941 as a Jew and sent to the concentration camp, he adopted Christianity and was received into the Russian Orthodox Church not long before being sent to Auschwitz. Ilya Fondaminsky died there on November 19, 1942, aged 62. In 2003, he was officially pronounced a Russian Orthodox saintly martyr by the Patriarch of Constantinople.
