= Black Sea Fleet electoral district =

Constituency of the Russian Republic

The Black Sea Fleet electoral district was a constituency created for the 1917 Russian Constituent Assembly election. The electoral district covered the military forces and employees and workers at bases under the command of the Black Sea Fleet.

== Results ==
Black Sea Fleet
Party	Vote	%	Seats
List 6 - Socialist-Revolutionaries	22,251	42.28	1
List 1 - Ukrainian Socialist-Revolutionaries	12,895	24.50	
List 5 - Bolsheviks	10,771	20.47	
List 2 - Baltic Sea Tsentroflot and the Sevastopol Branch of the Union of Sailors	4,769	9.06	
List 4 - Mensheviks	1,943	3.69	
List 3	?		
Total:	52,629		1

Deputies Elected
Bunakov-Fondaminsky	SR
