= Latin Mass Society (disambiguation) =

Latin Mass Society is a name used by various associations that promote the Tridentine Mass among Catholics, including:

- Latin Mass Society of England and Wales
- Latin Mass Society of Ireland

== See also ==
- Latin Mass (disambiguation)
- Traditionalist Catholicism
