= Vladimir Abrikosov =

Russian Greek Catholic priest (1880–1966)

- Владимир Абрикосов
- Born: 22 October 1880
- Died: 22 July 1966 (aged 85)
- Education: Imperial Moscow University

Vladimir Vladimirovich Abrikosov (22 October 1880 – 22 July 1966) was a Russian Catholic priest of the Byzantine rite who converted from Russian Orthodoxy and was a member of Russian Apostolate in the diaspora. He was a prominent figure in the Russian Greek Catholic Church in the early 20th century.

== Early years ==
Abrikosov was baptized in the Russian Orthodox Church, but in his youth, he held a critical view of religion. He graduated from the 5th Moscow Gymnasium and the Faculty of History and Philology at Moscow University, and also studied at Oxford. In 1905, he married his cousin Anna Abrikosova. Over the next five years, the couple traveled throughout Europe, where they became deeply interested in Catholicism.

== Conversion to Catholicism ==
In 1908, Anna converted to the Catholic Church, and a year later, Vladimir converted as well. In 1910, the Abrikosovs returned to Russia. At their apartment in Moscow, they hosted gatherings for members of the intelligentsia, engaging in discussions on religious topics, and provided financial support to impoverished Catholic children. During this period, Abrikosov's apartment served as one of the primary centers for the dissemination of Catholic ideas in Moscow. In 1913, the couple entered the novitiate of the Third Order of Saint Dominic. That same year, during a trip to Rome, they took their vows and became members of the order. They were also granted an audience with Pope Pius X. In Russia, the Abrikosovs practiced the Latin Rite, intending to return to the Byzantine Rite once it had become sufficiently established in Russia.

== Ordination as a Catholic priest ==
On 29 May 1917, Abrikosov took part in the First Council of the Russian Greek Catholic Church, held in Petrograd. Before the opening of the Council, he was ordained a Catholic priest of the Byzantine Rite by Metropolitan Andrey Sheptytsky of the Ukrainian Greek-Catholic Church. In the same year Sheptytsky appointed him pastor of the Greek Catholic parish in Moscow and superior of the Dominicans in Moscow.

== Arrest and expulsion from Russia ==
Between 1920 and 1922, the Abrikosovs' home hosted discussions between representatives of the Catholic and Orthodox churches, which were also attended by Moscow intellectuals. Under Abrikosov's influence, Dmitriy Kuz'min-Karavaev converted to Catholicism. Such activity was deemed counter-revolutionary; on 17 August 1922, Abrikosov was arrested and sentenced to death by firing squad, but the sentence was later commuted to permanent exile. On 29 September of the same year, Abrikosov was expelled from Russia aboard the philosophers' ship, along with 150 other prominent Russian intellectuals.

== Exile ==
While in exile, Abrikosov established contacts with various figures within the Russian émigré community, organized a committee of Russian Catholics in Rome, and kept the Holy See regularly informed about the persecution of Catholics in Soviet Russia (including his wife, who had remained in Russia).

In 1922 Abrikosov obtained an audience with Pope Pius XI to discuss the situation of the Russian Catholic Church. Soon after, Abrikosov was named Procurator of the Russian Exarchate by Mgr. Jules Tibirghien, an official of the Congregation for Eastern Churches. However, Abrikosov faced accusations of being a Russian spy by a Russian officer, Baron Igor von der Launitz. He also faced strong opposition from Bishop Michel d'Herbigny, who wanted Abrikosov to resign his position as Procurator, and conflicts with the Jesuits. Consequently, Abrikosov left Rome for Paris when it was rumoured that D'Herbigny intended to abolish the Exarchate.

== Death ==
In the final years of his life, Abrikosov withdrew from all contact with the Russian émigré community and lived in seclusion. He died on 22 July 1966.
