= Nikolai Alexandrov (priest) =

Russian Greek-Catholic priest (1884–1936)

Father Nikolai Alexandrov (1884 – 29 May 1936) was a Russian Greek-Catholic priest. Under the religious vows he took the name Peter.

== Biography ==
Nikolai Alexandrov was born in 1884 in Moscow. He graduated from the Moscow Technical School as an engineer-technologist. From 1912 he worked in Germany as an engineer in the company, Siemens-Schuckert. While in Germany Alexandrov converted to Catholicism from Russian Orthodoxy, his religion by birth. Since July 1913, after his return to Moscow he worked in city government, with the 1914 charge tramway workshops, with 1917 worked as an engineer. Nikolai Abrikosov joined the Greek Catholic community, helped the abbot came to his father, Vladimir Abrikosov. In 1918 he was arrested "in the case of the White Guard organization", but was released on 27 December. After that he became a monk taken the name Peter. In August 1921, on the recommendation of Vladimir Abrikosov, he was ordained to the priesthood by Archbishop Jan Cieplak, and was later appointed deputy by Exarch Leonid Feodorov in the event of his arrest. Since September 1922 after his father, Vladimir Abrikosov was sent abroad, headed the Moscow community of Greek-Catholics. He was arrested in Moscow in the night from 12 to 13 November 1923 for grouping business of Russian Catholics. On 19 May 1924 he was sentenced under articles 61 and 66 of the Criminal Code of the RSFSR to 10 years in prison. Sent to Solovki prison camp, first on the island of Conde, in the summer of 1925 Abrikosov was transferred to the central island. In the spring of 1929, together with Leonid Feodorov made Easter liturgy, which led to his transfer to the Anzer island. Soon he was sent to Belbaltlag the station Bear Mountain. In 1934 he was released but the ban stay in 6 major cities and border areas within 3 years. Settled in Dmitrov, Moscow region, Abrikosov worked as an engineer, however performed secret services in his apartment. In 1935 he was arrested in Dmitrov, and on 29 December was sentenced to 5 years in labor camps. Sent to the Solovki prison camp, Father Nikolai Abrikosov died here on 29 May 1936.
