= Russian Religious Renaissance =

The Russian Religious Renaissance was a period from roughly 1880 -1950 which witnessed a great creative outpouring of Russian philosophy, theology and spirituality. The term is derived from the title of a 1963 book by Nicholas Zernov called, The Russian Religious Renaissance of the Twentieth Century (Russian: Русское религиозное возрождение XX века, romanized: Russkoye religioznoye vozrozhdenie XX veka). The renaissance began in the late nineteenth century but was unexpectedly driven out of Russia due to the violent upheavals of the Bolshevik revolution and early atheistic Communist regimes. This dislocation led to the resettlement of many Russian intelligentsia in Europe and the West where the renaissance reached its full expression. Although often viewed as a development within the Russian Orthodox world, the spiritual ideals of the Russian Religious Renaissance were carried throughout the wider Eastern Orthodox Church and even into the Roman Catholic and Protestant communities.

== Philosophical origins ==
Theologian Paul L. Gavrilyuk explains that the Russian Religious Renaissance was an attempt to interpret all aspects of human existence: culture, politics, even economics, in Christian terms. The philosophical origins of the Russian Religious Renaissance can be found in the main currents of nineteenth-century western European and Russian religious thought: German idealism especially Schelling, the existentialism of Kierkegaard, religious questions raised by Tolstoy and Dostoevsky and the sophiology of Vladimir Solovyov. Solovyov's metaphysics of all unity stimulated an ontological turn in Russian religious thought and thinkers such as Sergius Bulgakov engaged and developed this theory extensively.

== The Paris School ==
With the establishment of the St. Sergius Orthodox Theological Institute in Paris in 1925, Russian émigré theologians, philosophers and historians began to create a diverse range of ideas and writing. The label "Paris School" has sometimes been applied collectively to the theology and religious philosophy of the founders of St. Sergius and other Russian émigré intellectuals in Paris including Georges Florovsky, Vladimir Lossky, Sergius Bulgakov, Alexander Schmemann, Nicholas Lossky and Nicholas Berdyaev. This label must be nuanced however by pointing out that there were at least five theological strains among the so-called Paris School. It was during the early decades of St. Sergius that the Russian Religious Renaissance reached its apogee for Eastern Orthodox Theology. By 1950, the older generation of émigrés had died (Bulgakov, Berdyaev and Shestov) so roughly this would mark the end of the renaissance. Several theologians from St. Sergius later became influential teachers in America. John Meyendorff and Georges Florovsky began at St. Sergius and later became professors at St. Vladimir's Orthodox Theological Seminary.

== Spirituality of the Russian Religious Renaissance ==
In addition to the philosophic and theological aspects, the Russian Religious Renaissance included a resurgence of Russian spirituality and its introduction to the West. The spiritual aspect of the renaissance is associated with people such as Silouan the Athonite, Archimandrite Sophrony, Archbishop Anthony Bloom and Mother Maria Skobtsova. Another notable Russian spiritual figure was Catherine Doherty (Ekaterina Fyodorovna Kolyschkine de Hueck Doherty) a Russian émigré from the Bolshevik Revolution.

== Russian spirituality in Roman Catholicism ==
The Russian Religious Renaissance extended beyond the Eastern Orthodox Church. Probably the most notable example is Catherine de Hueck Doherty, a Russian émigré who escaped during the Bolshevik Revolution. She later became a convert to Roman Catholicism and founder of Madonna House, a lay apostolate based in Combermere Canada. Madonna House is a Roman Catholic institution which includes Eastern Rite liturgies and many aspects of Russian spirituality such as poustinia, sobornost and molchanie. Catherine Doherty sought to incarnate the Gospel in all aspects of Christian life and her vision included many of the ideals of Solovyov, especially the re-unification of East and West.
