= Latin Mass =

Latin Mass may refer to:

- Liturgical use of Latin
  - Mass of Paul VI in Latin
- Tridentine Mass
  - As part of the use of preconciliar rites after the Second Vatican Council
- Some liturgies of the Pre-Tridentine Mass
- Latin Mass Magazine

== See also ==
- Latin Mass Society (disambiguation)
- Latin Church
- Latin liturgical rites
