= Hélène Iswolsky =

Russian writer, refugee and noble (1896–1975)

Hélène Iswolsky (Russian: Елена Александровна Извольская, born in 1896, Tegernsee, Germany; died in 1975, Cold Spring, New York, United States) was a Russian noblewoman, anti-communist political refugee, writer, translator and journalist. Raised Russian Orthodox, she was received into the Catholic Church in France and later became an oblate, taking the name Sister Olga.

The American novelist Flannery O'Connor, who "used to go with her nephew", later described Iswolsky as "a Catholic of the Eastern Rite persuasion and sort of one-man Catholic ecumenical movement".

== Biography ==
Hélène Iswolsky was born in 1896 into the family of Alexander Izvolsky, a Russian diplomat, and Countess Marguerite von Toll, a Baltic German noblewoman. Through her father, she was the niece of the Ober-Procurator of the Most Holy Synod, Pyotr Izvolskiy.

Her father was an ambassador of the Russian imperial government in different countries of Europe and Japan from 1894 to 1910, then Minister of Foreign Affairs and, from 1910 to 1917, Ambassador to France.

When the First World War broke out, Isvolsky and her mother were in Konstanz, Grand Duchy of Baden, Imperial Germany, while traveling from Russia back to France. As Iswolsky's mother pleaded with the city's Herr Kommandant, a general in the Imperial German Army, for permission to leave the country, a messenger arrived, dismounted from a motorcycle, and shouted, "Germany has declared war on Russia!" The messenger then jumped back on his motorcycle and drove away. Iswolsky later wrote, "At the sound of that departure, it seemed to me that the very heavens were coming down over my head. I heard the crash of a world that would never again be the same." Even though Iswolsky and her mother were enemy nationals in time of war, the General explained that, as he had not yet officially received a report about the outbreak of war, he could still issue the necessary documents for both women to leave Germany for neutral Switzerland. Iswolsky and her mother finally arrived in Paris on August 3, 1914, the day that Germany declared war on France.

In Paris during the war, Iswolsky took care of the wounded and dying soldiers at the Hôpital Russe. Following the February Revolution, Iswolsky learned that she and all other Russian doctors and nurses working there had been under surveillance by the Paris offices of the Tsarist secret police, or Okhrana.

Isvolsky earned a living by working for French magazines, translating from Russian to French and English, and from French to Russian (among others, the philosophical works of Nicholas Berdyaev and Vyacheslav Ivanov). In 1923, she converted from Orthodoxy to the Russian Greek Catholic Church. The rite of joining the Catholic Church was in a Benedictine monastery, where she met two Russian-born nuns, Paula and Eustochia Komarov (mother and daughter).

Following her conversion, Iswolsky regularly attended the Divine Liturgy at the Church of the Holy Trinity, located near the Porte d'Italie in Paris. She later praised the pastor, Mgr. Alexander Evreinov, in her memoirs. Evreinov offered the Byzantine Rite without the Latin Rite borrowings commonly added in Galicia, and "one might have thought oneself at an Orthodox service, except that prayers were offered for the Pope and our hierarchical head, the Archbishop of Paris". Iswolsky added that the chapel, although humble, "was decorated in the best of taste and according to the strictest Russian religious style; the iconostasis was the work of a Russian painter well-versed in ancient Eastern iconography. The central panel was a faithful copy of Rubleff's Trinity."

Iswolsky first met and befriended the poet Marina Tsvetaeva at a literary dinner at Meudon. Iswolsky was approached on arrival and told, "I am Marina Tsvetaeva and I have a message for you from Boris Pasternak." Tvetaeva explained that Pasternak had read and enjoyed Iswolsky's translation into French of his poem about the Russian Revolution of 1905.

In 1931, Iswolsky went to Nagasaki in Japan where she was married and became Baroness R. Ungern-Sternberg. The marriage was unhappy and, in 1932, she returned to Paris and since then used her original name only.

In 1941, Isvolsky moved from France to the United States. She stopped in New York City and, for the first time, received support from the Tolstoy Foundation. Here she met with Irma Manziarli who was born in Saint Petersburg and whose parents were German Protestants. During meetings at the home of Manziarli, she had the idea of publishing an ecumenical magazine. Among the founders of the magazine were people such as Vasily Janowski, the writer and doctor, Arthur Lourie, a composer and convert to Catholicism and Alexander Kazembek, party leader of the Mladorossi. The magazine title, The Third Hour, was taken from the Acts of the Apostles (Acts 2. 4-17). The first issue was published in 1946 in three versions: English, Russian and French. There were ten issues published in all. The last, in 1976 after Isvolsky's death, was dedicated to her. The purpose of the magazine was to unite all Christians—Catholics, Orthodox and Protestants. The magazine published the work of authors such as Simone Weil, Edith Stein, Mother Maria Skobtsova and Pierre Teilhard de Chardin. It was attended by eminent scholars Jacques Maritain, Karl Barth and Jean Daniélou. When it became possible, Hélène visited Russia. Initially, with Dorothy Day she traveled by train from Moscow to Vladivostok.

In 1961, she made a journey by car along the route Leningrad - Novgorod - Moscow - Vladimir - Tula - Oryol - Kharkiv - Poltava - Kiev. In Moscow, she visited the tomb of Vladimir Solovyov, where she collected some soil (in December 1975 in Tivoli, New York, the soil was placed in her grave). In the United States, she joined the social movement Catholic Worker. In her 60s, Isvolsky lived at times in Tivoli. Not far from Tivoli was a small Benedictine monastery and she began to take an active part in its spiritual life. In 1972, the monastery moved about 50 miles south to Cold Spring, New York, and in summer 1974, she moved from New York City to Cold Spring to be closer. The brothers helped her maintain a library, an extensive archive. Iswolsky died on Christmas Eve 1975, in a hospital near Cold Spring. Shortly before her death, she became an oblate of the Traditionalist Catholic Benedictine Abbey of Regina Laudis, taking the name Olga.

== Works ==
- Light before Dusk: A Russian Catholic in France, 1923-1941
- Soul of Russia
- Christ in Russia: The History, Tradition, and Life of the Russian Church
- Our Lady of Guadalupe Phenomenon
- The Diary of a Russian Priest by Alexander Elchaninov, translated by Hélène Iswolsky, London, 1967
- No Time to Grieve: An Autobiographical Journey from Russia to Paris to New York, 1985.
