= Philosophers' ships =

Soviet ships of expelled intellectuals

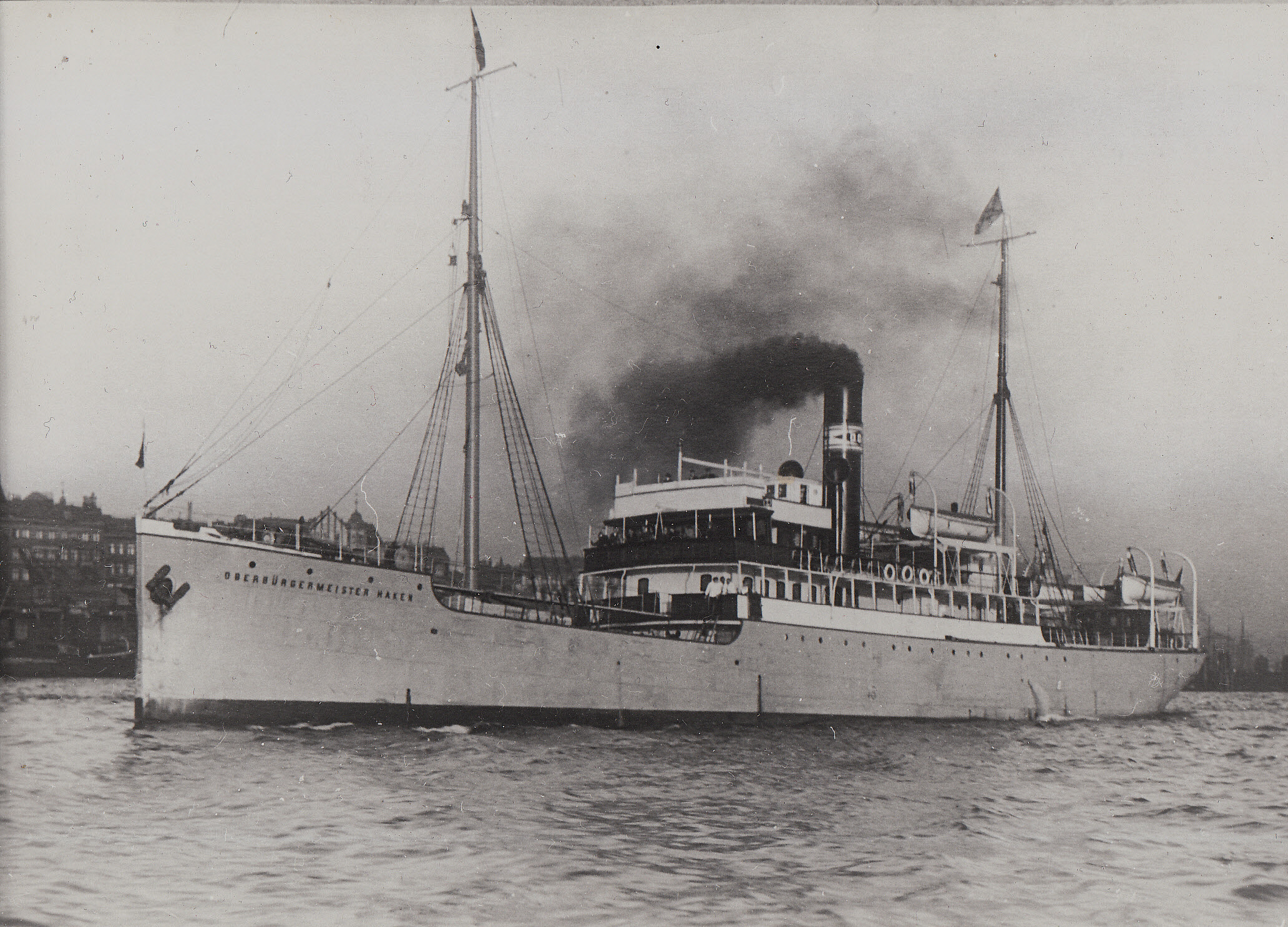
Oberbürgermeister Haken, photographed between 1895 and 1927, was one of the two main ships used in the deportations

The philosophers' ships or philosopher's steamers (Russian: философский пароход) were steamships that transported intellectuals expelled from Soviet Russia (Russian SFSR) in 1922.

The main load was handled by two German ships, the Oberbürgermeister Haken and the Preussen, which transported more than 200 expelled Russian intellectuals and their families in September and November 1922 from Petrograd (modern-day Saint Petersburg) to the seaport of Stettin in Germany (modern-day Szczecin in Poland). Three detention lists included 228 people, 32 of them students.

Later in 1922, other intellectuals were transported by train to Riga in Latvia or by ship from Odessa to Istanbul.

== Arrest of intellectuals ==
=== Initiation ===
As one of Vladimir Lenin's last major acts as leader (Chairman of the Council of People's Commissars of the Russian SFSR) before a series of strokes beginning in May 1922 left him incapacitated, he initiated the imprisonment and internal banishment of the leading figures representative of Russia's Silver Age of intellectuals and who opposed the newly established Bolshevik government from May 1922 onwards. Lenin had an article, On the Significance of Militant Materialism, published in March 1922. In it, Lenin called religion and modern philosophy the "ideological slaves of the bourgeoisie" who aspired for the restoration of the old pre-Bolshevik system. He ended the article by stating "the Russian worker has gained his power but is not yet able to use it; otherwise, he would politely send such teachers and members of the scientific communities to countries with a bourgeois 'democracy'". Lenin had also kept a close eye on the activity of Russian intellectuals, and his personal library contained works by those who would be exiled. Historian L.A. Kogan stated that although the idea may have originated from someone else, Lenin was the operation's mastermind. This view is shared by French historian Michel Geller who said, "Lenin was the initiator of the exile and the architect of the entire policy that culminated in the deportation of these representatives of Russian culture."

In early May, Lenin explored the idea of the mass expulsion of teachers and writers as an alternative to executions in a letter to Dmitry Kursky, the People's Commissariat of Justice. On May 15, Lenin outlined a draft of a supplementary article to the Penal Code. The modification made involvement in spreading propaganda or agitation for, or membership and assistance of organisations whose aim was the overthrow Bolshevik government through violence punishable by death, which could be commuted to imprisonment or deportation abroad by the Presidium of the Central Executive Committee. In addition, he directed the Justice Department to amend the Penal Code on May 17 to make the expression or support of anti-Soviet viewpoints punishable by death or deportation. On May 19, secret police chief Felix Dzerzhinsky — head of the State Political Directorate (GPU) — was ordered to find evidence against intellectuals to allow them to be charged under the new laws.

Nikolai Semashko, the People's Commissar of Health of the Russian SFSR, sent a letter to Lenin on 23 May. The letter outlined the anti-Soviet attitude Semashko perceived at the All-Russian Conference of Physicians he had attended, which he accused of being influenced by Kadets, monarchists, and Social Revolutionaries in their pursuit of freely elected officials, grassroot independent organisations, and maintaining independence from the government. Semashko recommended that Lenin limit the independence of professional organisations, ban independent publishing, obligate the practice of "Soviet medicine", and the removal of anti-Soviet physicians. Lenin forwarded Semashko's letter to Joseph Stalin who submitted it to the Politburo as General Secretary of the Central Committee. Lenin's handwritten question to the Politburo was whether "to direct Dzerzhinsky [and the] GPU to work out measures with the assistance of Semashko." Lenin's proposal to initiate the repression of physicians was approved by all present Politburo members (Stalin, Lev Kamenev, Vyacheslav Molotov, Alexei Rykov, Leon Trotsky) with the exception of Mikhail Tomsky who abstained. Tomsky wrote that he abstained as he felt "the issue of the Congress of Physicians needs to be presented in a different framework. We are guilty ourselves for much of this and Semashko is the most guilty."

=== GPU operation ===
Dzerzhinsky submitted within two weeks an GPU report to the Politburo titled About Anti-Soviet Groupings among the Intelligentsia. The report identified the presence of anti-Soviet activities among the country's professional organisations, universities, academic societies, and trade organisations. The 'Decree about Anti-Soviet Groupings among the Intelligentsia" was issued by the Politburo on 8 June 1922. The decree called for incoming university students to be filtered, restricting the meetings of students and professors, and a ban on independent publishing activities. It also created a special 'conference' of officials from the People's Commissariat for Foreign Affairs and Justice empowered to exile individuals abroad or to other parts of Russia. A commission consisting of Kamenev, Iosif Unshlikht of the GPU and Kursky would do the final review of individuals to be punished.

The Politburo received a list of anti-Soviet physicians on June 22, but the operation against physicians had broadened into a general repression of intellectuals. The special conference had submitted a list of anti-Soviet intellectuals to the Politburo on June 20, but it was deemed "unsatisfactory" due to list being too short. The same day, the GPU submitted to Stalin a request to speed up operations as rumours of impending arrests started to spread. On August 2, a list of 186 individuals was submitted by the GPU. Most of those named were scheduled to be arrested, then deported either abroad or internally. Some were still listed despite the conference deeming them harmless and advising against deportation. The list contained the names of doctors, engineers, professors, and literary figures. Physicians were, in particularly, given internal exile to remote regions where they were intended to continue practicing medicine.

The Politburo accepted the list on August 10, ordering the GPU to detain the most dangerous named people and place the rest under house arrest. Each individual on the list was designated by a number and included their address. In August and September, arrests were carried across the country, including in Petrograd, Moscow, Kiev and Yalta. Separate lists had been compiled for Petrograd, Moscow and Ukraine, with 77 people on the Ukrainian list, 67 on the Moscow list, and 30 on the Petrograd list. Much of those arrested were taken by surprise. They were given no trial, no explanation or the ability to defend themselves. All the arrests took place at night, with each arrest taking around 4-hours as officers searched their homes for evidence. For philosopher and theologian Nikolai Berdyaev, officers seized his notebooks, letters and discarded documents. In total, 160 individuals were arrested. Of the 67 individuals in Moscow to be exiled, 14 were detained, 12 were under house arrest, 6 had not been arrested, and 21 had agreed to leave on their own. In interrogations, the arrested were asked on their opinion of “the Soviet power structure and the proletarian system of government”.

The official announcement for the deportations was made in Pravda, the main Soviet newspaper, on 31 August under the headline "First Warning". It assured readers that "no great scientist" were being targeted. A budget for the cost of exiling 217 people abroad was submitted on August 22 to Stalin. He also received reports on the operation's progress on August 22 and 26.

== Expulsions ==
In total, between 228 and 272 intellectuals and their families were deported from Russia abroad the Philosopher's ships. At least five steamship voyages took place, with two ships – Oberbürgermeister Haken and Preussen – transporting the exiles from Petrograd to Stettin (today Szczecin, Poland) in Germany. In addition, exiles were transported by steamships from Odessa and Sevastopol to Constantinople (Istanbul), and by train from Moscow to Latvia and Germany. Those travelling by steamship had their tickets paid by the Soviet government, whilst those travelling by train had to pay. The luggage allowed to be carried was limited to mainly just a few items of clothing. In the memoir of Fyodor Stepun, he recounts how the deportees could only take a winter and summer coat, two day and nightshirts, two undergarments, and two pairs of underwear and socks. Gold and jewellery were forbidden except for wedding rings, and baptismal crosses had to be removed from their necks. Each person could only take a maximum of $20.

Oberbürgermeister Haken left Petrograd on the morning of 28 September 1922 carrying Russian intellectuals that included several writers, poets, journalists, scientists and philosophers along with their families. Among its passengers was Berdyaev. A second ship, Preussen, carried a second load of individuals to Stettin from 16 to 17 November. Both ships carried a total of 225 people. After landing in Germany, they boarded a train at Stettin Central Station for Berlin where accommodation had been arranged for most of them by Alexander Kerensky, former Prime Minister of the Russian Provisional Government overthrown in 1917 by the Bolsheviks. Many then emigrated to other countries, including the United States, France, and Czechoslovakia.

== Reasoning ==
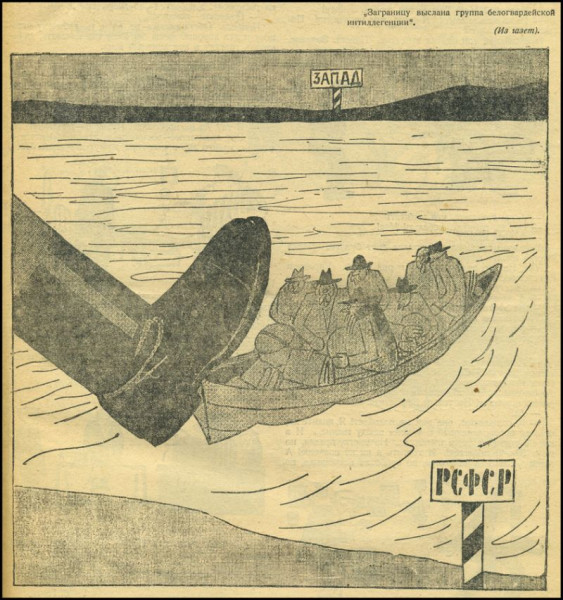
Cartoon of those exiled aboard the Philosopher's ships being kicked out from the Russian SFSR towards to the West.

The Philosopher's ships were portrayed by the Soviet government as a humane answer to dealing with dissidents. In Pravda it was written in August 1922 that 'the expulsion of active counter-revolutionary elements and bourgeois intelligentsia is the first warning of the Soviet power for these strata". In an interview with American journalist Louise Bryant, Trotsky stated that "we expelled those people because there was no pretext to shoot them dead, and there was no possibility to tolerate them". He urged Bryant to "rehabilitate Soviet power before world public opinion” by also saying that those exiled were "politically insignificant", but who were "potential weapon in the hands of our enemies". In the case of a war, they would have to be shot. He ended by saying, "that is why we prefer to expel them now, early in the quiet period. I hope you will recognize our prudent humanity." Aside from the official Soviet justification, increasing ideological control through the elimination of the intellectual elite was a major reason.

By 1922, the Bolsheviks had become increasingly more engaged and connected with other countries, particularly on economic matters. The Treaty of Rapallo signed with Germany on 16 April 1922 had allowed Russia to obtain loans from international banks. Death sentences would've caused an international outcry, potentially leading to an international embargo of Russia – reversing the gains made in normalising relations with foreign countries. Russia was also still receiving aid from the American Relief Administration (ARA) in the aftermath of World War I and the 1921-22 famine. Execution of intellectuals could have led to ARA cancelling the program in Russia early. The director of the aid plan, Herbert Hoover, had already threatened to halt relief efforts in Russia. Aid to Russia was ultimately terminated in 1923.

== Legacy ==
In Soviet history, the philosophers' ships remain largely unknown. It is called a 'white spot' by Russian emigration historian Mikhail Geller as Soviet historians do not fully elaborate on the ships whilst those exiled left little testimony on their expulsion. The opening of KGB archives after the 1990s revealed additional information on the ships, such as Lenin being the main instigator. The name "philosophers' ship" was introduced by Russian philosopher and mathematician Sergey Khoruzhiy in an article titled "philosophical steamship" published in Literaturnaya Gazeta in 1990.

== Notable individuals expelled ==
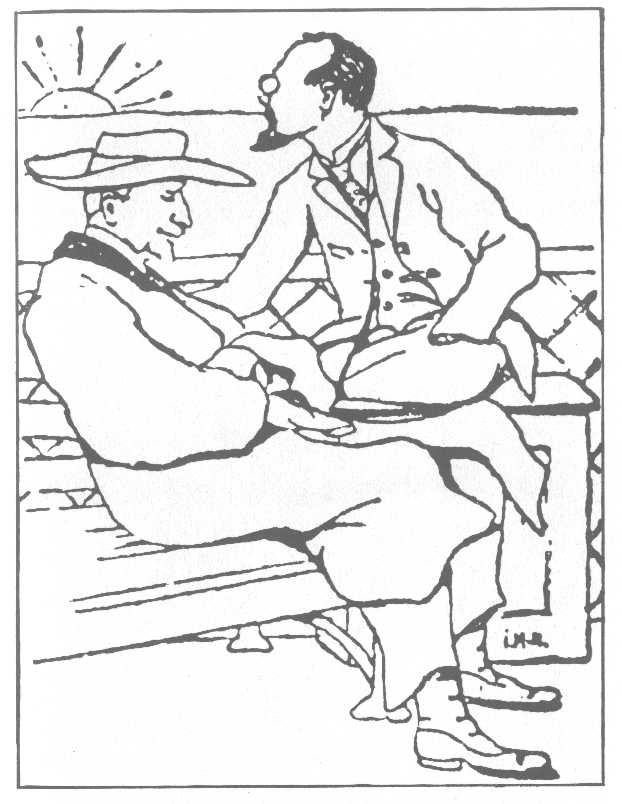
1922 drawing of professor Ivan Ilyin and Prince Serge Troubetzkoy on a steamship sailing for Germany.

- Vladimir Abrikosov
- Yuly Aikhenvald
- Nikolai Berdyaev
- Alexander Bogolepov
- Boris Brutskus
- Sergei Bulgakov
- Valentin Bulgakov
- Semyon Frank
- Ivan Ilyin
- Abram Saulovich Kagan (university lecturer/publisher; father of architect Anatol Kagan)
- Lev Karsavin (the brother of ballerina Tamara Karsavina; arrested again in 1940 and deported to a gulag in Komi, where he died in 1952)
- Dmitry Kuzmin-Karavayev
- Alexander Kiesewetter
- Ivan Lapshin
- Nikolai Lossky
- Mikhail Osorgin
- Pitirim Sorokin (by train)
- Fyodor Stepun
- Prince Serge Troubetzkoy
- Boris Vysheslavtsev

== Literature ==
- Catherine Baird. Revolution from Within: The Ymca in Russia’s Ascension to Freedom from Bolshevik Tyranny, 2013, ISBN 9780986219900 (with bio List of the Deported)
- Lesley Chamberlain, Lenin's Private War: The Voyage of the Philosophy Steamer and the Exile of the Intelligentsia, St Martin's Press, 2007; ISBN 0-312-36730-9
- V. G. Makarov, V. S. Khristoforov: «Passazhiry ‹filosofskogo parokhoda›. (Sud’by intelligencii, repressirovannoj letom-osen’ju 1922g.)». // Voprosy filosofii 7 (600) 2003, p. 113-137 [contains a list with biographical information on Russian intellectuals exiled 1922-1923].
