= Maria Skobtsova =

Russian nun and resistance fighter

- Мария Скобцова
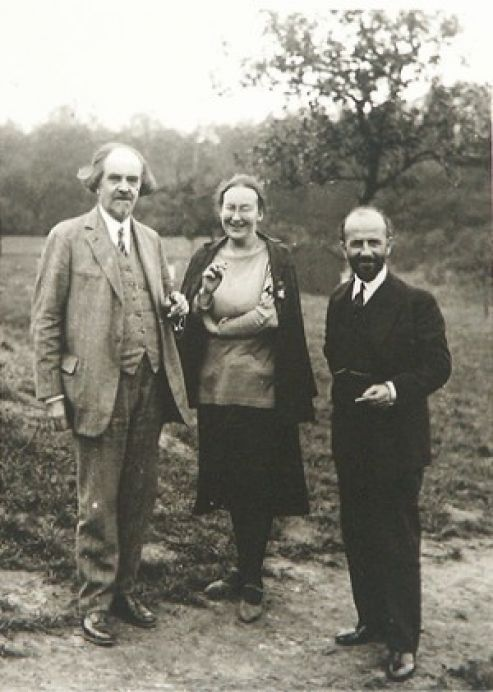
- Maria with Nikolai Berdyaev and Stefan Tsankov, 1930
- Born: Elizaveta Yurievna Pilenko; 20 December 1891; Riga, Russian Empire (now Latvia)
- Died: 31 March 1945 (aged 53); Ravensbrück Concentration Camp, Fürstenberg/Havel, Germany
- Cause of death: Poison gas
- Title: Mayor of Anapa
- Political party: Socialist-Revolutionary Party
- Spouse(s): Dmitry Kuzmin-Karavayev (m. 1910-1913; divorced); Daniil Skobtsov (dissolved 1932)
- Children: 3
- Awards: Righteous among the Nations

Saint Maria of Paris
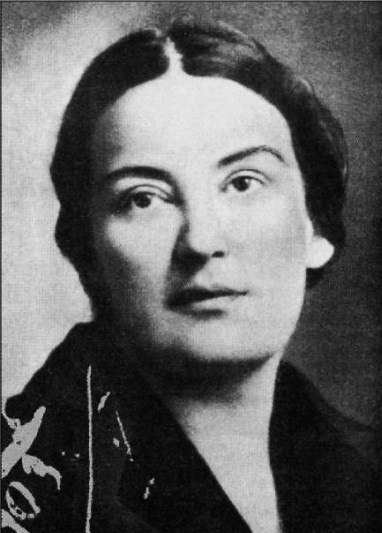
- Saint Maria Skobtsova of Paris

Righteous martyr
- Born: Elizaveta Pilenko; 20 December 1891; Riga, Russian Empire
- Residence: 77, Rue de Lourmel, Grenelle, 15th Arrondissement of Paris
- Died: 31 March 1945; Ravensbrück Concentration Camp, Fürstenberg/Havel, Germany
- Venerated in: Eastern Orthodox Church; Episcopal Church; Anglican Church of Canada; Anglican Church of Australia
- Canonized: 1 May 2004, Istanbul by the Ecumenical Patriarch of Constantinople.
- Feast: 20 July [July 7 Old Calendar]

Maria Skobtsova (Note: born Elizaveta Yurievna Pilenko (Елизавета Юрьевна Пиленко), Kuzmina-Karavayeva (Кузьмина-Караваева) by her first marriage, Skobtsova (Скобцова) by her second marriage) (20 [8 Old Calendar] December 1891 – 31 March 1945) was a Russian noblewoman, poet, nun and member of the French Resistance during World War II. Also known as Mother Maria (Note: Russian: Мать Мария) or Mary of Paris, she was canonized in the Eastern Orthodox Church in 2004 and is remembered with a Lesser Feast in the Episcopal Church, the Anglican Church of Canada and the Anglican Church of Australia. She was also added to the French Catholic calendar of saints by Cardinal Jean-Marie Lustiger, then the Archbishop of Paris.

== Life ==
Maria was born to an aristocratic family in 1891 in Riga, Russian Empire (now Latvia). She was given the name Elizaveta Pilenko. Her father died when she was a teenager, and she embraced atheism. In 1906 her mother moved the family to St. Petersburg, where she became involved in radical intellectual circles. In 1910, she married a Bolshevik by the name of Dmitriy Kuz'min-Karavaev. During this period of her life she was actively involved in literary circles and wrote much poetry. Her first book, Scythian Shards (Скифские черепки), was a collection of poetry from this period. By 1913, her marriage to Dimitriy had ended. He subsequently converted to Catholicism and became a Catholic priest.

Through a look at the humanity of Christ — "He also died. He sweated blood. They struck his face" — she began to be drawn back into Christianity. She moved - now with her daughter, Gaiana - to the south of Russia where her religious devotion increased. Furious at Leon Trotsky for closing the Socialist-Revolutionary Party Congress, she planned his assassination, but was dissuaded by colleagues, who sent her to Anapa. In 1918, after the Bolshevik Revolution, she was elected deputy mayor of Anapa in Southern Russia. When the anti-communist White Army took control of Anapa, the mayor fled and she became mayor of the town. The White Army put her on trial for being a Bolshevik. However, the judge was a former teacher of hers, Daniil Skobtsov, and she was acquitted. Quickly, the two fell in love and were married.

Soon, the political tide was turning again. In order to avoid danger, Elizaveta, Daniil, Gaiana, and Elizaveta's mother Sophia fled the country. Elizaveta was pregnant with her second child. They traveled first to Georgia (where her son Yuri was born) and then to Yugoslavia (where her daughter Anastasia was born). Finally they arrived in Paris in 1923. Soon Elizaveta was dedicating herself to theological studies and social work. In 1926, Anastasia died of influenza. Gaiana was sent away to Belgium to boarding school. Soon, Daniil and Elizaveta's marriage was falling apart. Yuri ended up living with Daniil, and Elizaveta moved into central Paris to work more directly with those who were most in need.

Her bishop encouraged her to take vows as a nun, something she did only with the assurance that she would not have to live in a monastery, secluded from the world. In 1932, with Daniil Skobtov's permission, an ecclesiastical divorce was granted, and she took monastic vows. She took the religious name "Maria". Her confessor was Father Sergei Bulgakov. Later, Fr. Dmitri Klepinin would be sent to be the chaplain of the house.

Mother Maria made a rented house in Paris her "convent". It was a place with an open door for refugees, the needy and the lonely. It also soon became a center for intellectual and theological discussion. In Mother Maria these two elements - service to the poor and theology - went hand-in-hand.

== Death ==
After the Fall of France in 1940, Jews began approaching the house asking for baptismal certificates, which Father Dimitri would provide them. Many Jews came to stay with them. They provided shelter and helped many to flee the country. Eventually the house was closed down. Mother Maria, Fr. Dimitri, Yuri and Sophia were all arrested by the Gestapo. Fr. Dimitri and Yuri both died at the Dora concentration camp.

Mother Maria was sent to the Ravensbrück concentration camp. On March 31, 1945, Holy Saturday, she was sent to the gas chamber.

== Veneration ==
Mother Maria was glorified by act of the Holy Synod of the Ecumenical Patriarchate on 16 January 2004. The glorification of Mother Maria, together with Fr. Dimitri, Yuri, and Ilya Fondaminsky took place at the Cathedral of Saint Alexander Nevsky in Paris on 1 and 2 May 2004. Their feast day is 20 July.

Skobtsova is also commemorated in the American Episcopal Church's calendar, with a lesser feast on July 21. She was also added to the French Catholic calendar of saints by Cardinal Jean-Marie Lustiger, then the Archbishop of Paris.

== Legacy ==
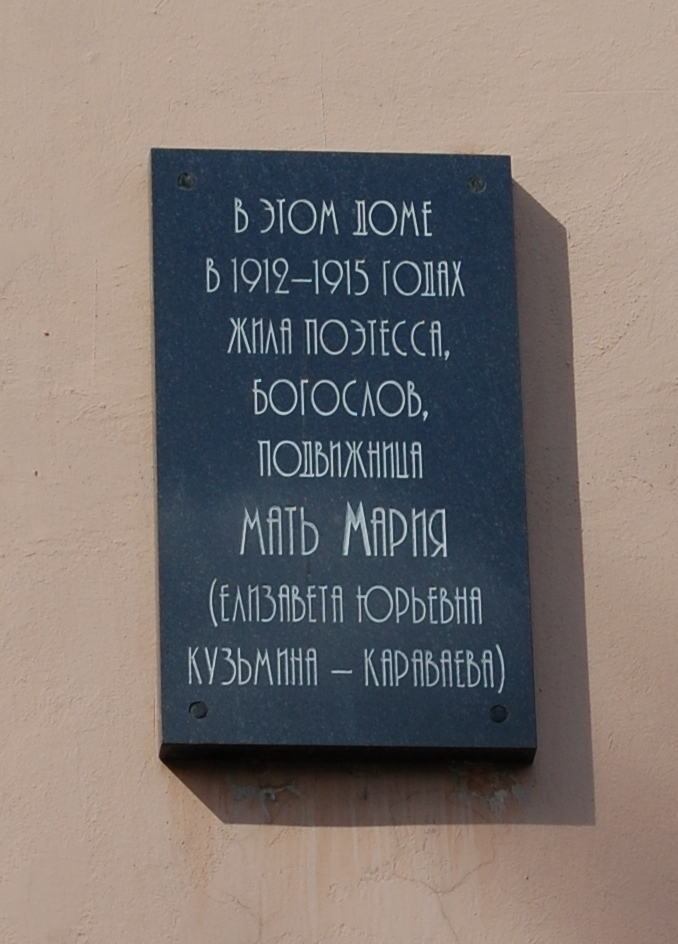
Maria Skobtsova Commemorative Plaque in Saint Petersburg

On June 24, 2020, a memorial plaque to Skobtsova was unveiled at the famous Sainte Genevieve de Bois cemetery, on the territory of the Russian necropolis.

Mother Maria was designated as Righteous among the Nations at Yad Vashem in Israel.

The Association Maria Skobtsova and the Mother Maria Skobtsova House in Calais, France, are refugee services which are named after her.

== Example of poetry ==
In July, 1942, when the order requiring Jews to wear the yellow star was published, she wrote a poem entitled "Israel":

Two triangles, a star,
The shield of King David, our forefather.
This is election, not offense.
The great path and not an evil.
Once more in a term fulfilled,
Once more roars the trumpet of the end;
And the fate of a great people
Once more is by the prophet proclaimed.
Thou art persecuted again, O Israel,
But what can human malice mean to thee,
who have heard the thunder from Sinai?

== Publications ==
- Skobtsova, E. (1929). А. Хомяковъ [A. Khomyakov] (in Russian). Paris: YMCA Press.
- Skobtsova, E. (1929). Достоевский и современность [Dostoyevsky and Modernity] (in Russian). Paris: YMCA Press. OCLC 493551629.
- Skobtsova, E. (1929). Миросозерцание Вл. Соловьева [The World-Concept of Vl. Solov'ev] (in Russian). Paris: YMCA Press.
- Skobtsova, Maria (1947). Zeluck, Oreste (ed.). Стихотворения, поэмы, мистерии, воспоминания об аресте и лагере в Равенсбрюк [Poems, narrative poems, mysteries, memoirs of the arrest and camp in Ravensbrück] (in Russian). Paris: La Presse Française et Étrangère. OCLC 491729129.
- Skobtsova, Maria (2003). Mother Maria Skobtsova: Essential Writings. Translated by Richard Pevear and Larissa Volokhonsky, introduction by Jim Forest. Maryknoll, NY: Orbis Books. ISBN 1-57075-436-5. OCLC 49610914.
- Skobtsova (Mother Maria), E. (2016). The Crucible of Doubts: Khomyakov, Dostoevsky, Vl. Solov'ev, In Search of Synthesis, Four 1929 Works. Translated and commentary by Fr. S. Janos. frsj Publications. ISBN 978-0-9963992-3-4.

== See also ==
- Outline of the Russian Revolution and Civil War
- Bibliography of the Russian Revolution and Civil War
- Bibliography of Stalinism and the Soviet Union
- Index of Old Bolsheviks
- Index of articles related to the Russian Revolution and Civil War

== Sources ==
- Plekon, Michael (2009). Hidden Holiness. University of Notre Dame Press. ISBN 978-0-268-03893-9. OCLC 276818992.

=== Biographies ===
- Target, G.W. (1974). The Nun in the Concentration Camp : The Story of Mother Maria [Elizabeth Pilenko]. Religious Education Press. ISBN 978-0-08-017610-9.
- Smith, T. Stratton. The Rebel Nun. London: Souvenir Press.
- Hackel, Fr. Sergei. Pearl of Great Price.
- Men', Fr Aleksandr (2015). "Mother Maria (Skobtsova)". Russian Religious Philosophy: 1989-1990 Lectures. frsj Publications. ISBN 9780996399227.
