= Alexei Abrikosov (physicist) =

Soviet–American theoretical physicist (1928–2017)

- Алексей Абрикосов
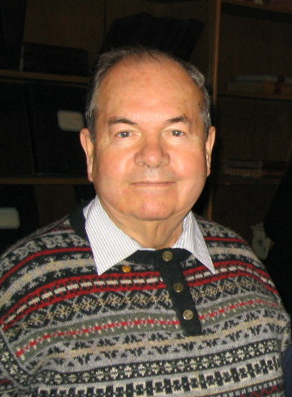
- Abrikosov in 2003
- Born: June 25, 1928; Moscow, Russian SFSR, Soviet Union
- Died: March 29, 2017 (aged 88); Palo Alto, California, United States
- Citizenship: Soviet Union (1928–1991); Russia (since 1992); United States (since 1999)
- Education: Moscow State University; USSR Academy of Sciences
- Known for: Abrikosov vortex; Fermi liquid theory; Quantum triviality; Condensed matter physics; Type-II superconductor
- Spouse: Svetlana Yuriyevna Bunkova (m. 1977)
- Children: 3
- Awards: Lenin Prize (1966); Fritz London Prize (1972); USSR State Prize (1982); Landau Gold Medal (1989); Member of the National Academy of Sciences (2000); ForMemRS (2001); Nobel Prize in Physics (2003)
- Scientific career
- Fields: Physics
- Workplaces: Landau Institute; Moscow State University; Moscow Institute of Physics and Technology; Argonne National Laboratory; University of Chicago
- Doctoral advisor: Lev. D Landau
- Website: www.msd.anl.gov/abrikosov

Alexei Alexeyevich Abrikosov (Russian: Алексе́й Алексе́евич Абрико́сов; June 25, 1928 – March 29, 2017) was a Russian-American theoretical physicist whose main contributions are in the field of condensed matter physics. He was the co-recipient of the 2003 Nobel Prize in Physics, with Vitaly Ginzburg and Anthony James Leggett, for theories about how matter can behave at extremely low temperatures.

== Education and early life ==
Abrikosov was born in Moscow, Russian SFSR, Soviet Union, on June 25, 1928, to a couple of physicians: Aleksey Abrikosov and Fani (née Wulf). His mother was Jewish. After graduating from high school in 1943, Abrikosov began studying energy technology. He graduated from Moscow State University in 1948. From 1948 to 1965, he worked at the Institute for Physical Problems of the USSR Academy of Sciences, where he received his Ph.D. in 1951 for the theory of thermal diffusion in plasmas, and then his Doctor of Physical and Mathematical Sciences (a "higher doctorate") degree in 1955 for a thesis on quantum electrodynamics at high energies. Abrikosov moved to the US in 1991 and lived there until his death in 2017, in Palo Alto, California. While in the US, Abrikosov was elected to the National Academy of Sciences in 2000, and in 2001, to be a foreign member of the Royal Society.

== Career ==
From 1965 to 1988, he worked at the Landau Institute for Theoretical Physics (USSR Academy of Sciences). He has been a professor at Moscow State University since 1965. In addition, he held tenure at the Moscow Institute of Physics and Technology from 1972 to 1976, and at the Moscow Institute of Steel and Alloys from 1976 to 1991. He served as a full member of the USSR Academy of Sciences from 1987 to 1991. In 1991, he became a full member of the Russian Academy of Sciences.

In two works in 1952 and 1957, Abrikosov explained how magnetic flux can penetrate a class of superconductors. This class of materials are called type-II superconductors. The accompanying arrangement of magnetic flux lines is called the Abrikosov vortex lattice.

Together with Lev Gor'kov and Igor Dzyaloshinskii, Abrikosov has written an iconic book on theoretical solid-state physics, which has been used to train physicists in the field for decades.

From 1991 until his retirement, he worked at Argonne National Laboratory in the U.S. state of Illinois. Abrikosov was an Argonne Distinguished Scientist at the Condensed Matter Theory Group in Argonne's Materials Science Division. When he received the Nobel Prize, his research was focused on the origins of magnetoresistance, a property of some materials that change their resistance to electrical flow under the influence of a magnetic field.

== Honours and awards ==
Abrikosov was awarded the Lenin Prize in 1966, the Fritz London Memorial Prize in 1972, and the USSR State Prize in 1982. In 1989 he received the Landau Prize from the Academy of Sciences, Russia. Two years later, in 1991, Abrikosov was awarded the Sony Corporation's John Bardeen Award. The same year he was elected a Foreign Honorary Member of the American Academy of Arts and Sciences. He shared the 2003 Nobel Prize in Physics. He was also a member of the Royal Academy of London, a fellow of the American Physical Society, and in 2000 was elected to the prestigious National Academy of Sciences. Other awards include:

- Member of the Academy of Sciences of the USSR (now Russian Academy of Sciences), 1964
- Honorary Doctor of the University of Lausanne, 1975
- Order of the Badge of Honour, 1975
- Order of the Red Banner of Labour, 1988
- Academician of the Academy of Sciences of the USSR (now Russian Academy of Sciences), 1987
- Elected a Foreign Member of the Royal Society (ForMemRS) in 2001
- Golden Plate Award of the American Academy of Achievement, 2004
- Gold Medal of Vernadsky from National Academy of Sciences of Ukraine, 2015

== Personal life ==
Abrikosov was the son of the physicians Alexei Ivanovich Abrikosov (1875-1955) and his second wife, Fania Davidovna Woolf (1895—1965). Through his father, Abrikosov was the nephew of the martyred Catholic nun Anna Abrikosova (1882-1936).

His sister was Maria Alekseevna Abrikósova (1929-1998), physician.

He married Svetlana Yuriyevna Bunkova and had 3 children.

Abrikosov supported Obama campaign in 2008 and 2012.

He died in California on 29 March 2017 at the age of 88.

== Books ==
- Abrikosov, Alexey; Gor'kov, Lev; Dzyaloshinskii, Igor (1975). Methods of Quantum Field Theory in Statistical Physics. London, U.K.: Dover Publications. ISBN 978-0199232727.
- Abrikosov, Alexey (1988). Fundamentals of the Theory of Metals. Amsterdam: North Holland. ISBN 978-0444870940.

== See also ==
- List of Jewish Nobel laureates
