= Dmitry Kuzmin-Karavayev =

Russian revolutionary and Greek Catholic priest (1886–1959)

Dmitry Vladimirovich Kuzmin-Karavayev (1886–1959) was a Russian Catholic priest and former Bolshevik who converted after the October Revolution from Marxist-Leninist atheism to Catholicism. He was working at the time as a senior official of the Commissariat of Nationalities directly under a young Joseph Stalin. After being deported from the Soviet Union in the Philosophers' shisp, he was ordained to the priesthood in the Russian Greek Catholic Church and became a well-known professor at the Russicum.

== Early life ==
He was born in St. Petersburg as the son of a Russian Orthodox professor of law. According to Lesley Chamberlain, Kuzmin-Karavayev was also born into the hereditary Russian nobility.

During his legal studies at the University of St. Petersburg, Dmitriy discovered the writings of Vladimir Ilyich Lenin and joined the Bolshevik faction of the Russian Social Democratic Party. After serving a prison term, he openly ceased all anti-Tsarist activity and received a position with the Department of State Properties at the Ministry of Agriculture.

He was married for a time to Maria Skobtsova, a fellow revolutionary and at the time an atheist as well. Maria would eventually return to Russian Orthodoxy, and move to Paris following the Russian Civil War. She formed a convent and helped the poor. During World War II, she shielded and saved dozens of Jewish children, and for that she was arrested and executed by the Nazis at Ravensbruck Concentration Camp. She would later be canonized in the Orthodox Church.

== Conversion ==
In 1913, Dmitriy purchased a copy of the New Testament from a woman peddling the scriptures on a train from Tambov to St. Petersburg. "I did it," he wrote, "partly out of compassion and partly out of snobbery." When his mother later put his briefcase in order, she was overjoyed to see his latest purchase. To please her, he grudgingly continued to carry the volume with him, but did not begin reading it until after the Bolshevik Revolution in 1917.

He later wrote,

"How many moments of consolation do I owe to that New Testament! The image of Christ the Savior, His winning humility, His love of God and men, so profound and impartial, are forever ingrained on my heart."

Dmitriy drifted into the Russian Catholic Church parish overseen by Father Vladimir Abrikosov and was received into the Catholic Church on 5 May 1920. At the time, he was working as an official of the Commissariat for Nationalities under Joseph Stalin. In 1922, he was formally deported by the Soviet regime.

== Later life ==
In 1927 was ordained a Catholic priest of the Byzantine rite and his ministry was exercised abroad, in Belgium, France and Italy. However, Karavaev was critical of an idea much present in his epoch: the biritualism of certain Russian priests - Latin and Byzantine - which would be an obstacle to uniting Orthodox believers to the Catholic Church. Karavaev died in 1959.
