= Aleksey Abrikosov =

Soviet pathologist

- Алексей Абрикосов
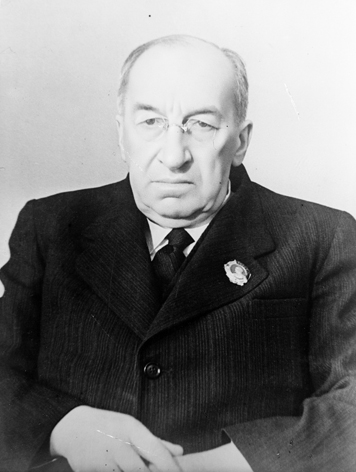
- Abrikosov in 1945
- Born: 18 January [O.S. 6 January] 1875; Moscow, Russian Empire
- Died: April 9, 1955 (aged 80); Moscow, Russian SFSR, Soviet Union
- Resting place: Novodevichy Cemetery, Moscow
- Education: Doctor of Science (1904); Academician of the Russian Academy of Sciences; Imperial Moscow University (1898)
- Scientific career
- Fields: Medicine
- Workplaces: Imperial Moscow University; Moscow State University
- Thesis: About the first anatomical changes in the lungs with the onset of pulmonary tuberculosis

Aleksey Ivanovich Abrikosov (Russian: Алексе́й Ива́нович Абрико́сов; 18 January [O.S. 6 January] 1875 – 9 April 1955) was a Soviet pathologist and a member of the Soviet Academy of Sciences (1939–1955) and the Soviet Academy of Medical Sciences (1944–1955).

== Early life ==
Aleksey Abrikosov was born into a wealthy family of factory owners, who were the official suppliers of chocolate confections to the Russian Imperial Court. His grandfather was the industrialist Aleksei Ivanovich Abrikosov, who was the founder of the company now known as Babayevsky. His father, Ivan Alekseevich Abrikosov, was expected to take over the family firm until his premature death from tuberculosis. His siblings included future Tsarist diplomat Dmitry Abrikosov and future Catholic Sainthood Candidate Anna Abrikosova.

Although the younger members of the family rarely attended Divine Liturgy, the Abrikosovs regarded themselves as pillars of the Russian Orthodox Church.

== Career ==
Abrokosov published works on the subject of the pathological morphology of tuberculosis and tumors, including the neuroectodermal tumor. This was described by Abrikosov as "myoblastomyoma." Based upon his work, this type of tumor was named "Abrikosov's tumor". He was the author of a multi-volume handbook in special pathology.

=== Embalming of Lenin ===
On the morning of 23 January 1924, Abrikosov was given the task of embalming Lenin’s body to keep it intact until his burial. The body is still on permanent display in the Lenin's Mausoleum in Moscow.

== Personal life ==
Aleksey Abrikosov was the father of Alexei Abrikosov, a theoretical physicist and a co-recipient of the 2003 Nobel Prize in Physics.

He died on 9 April 1955 in Moscow, aged 80, and was buried at Novodevichy Cemetery.

== Honors and awards ==
- Stalin Prize, first class (1942) - for scientific study "Private pathological anatomy. Part II: The heart and blood vessels", published in late 1940.
- Two Orders of Lenin
- Order of the Red Banner of Labour
- Hero of Socialist Labour (1945)

== Bibliography ==
- Andreev, A.; Tsygankov, D. (2010). Sadovnichiĭ, V. A. (ed.). Imperatorskiĭ Moskovskiĭ universitet, 1755-1917: ėnt︠s︡iklopedicheskiĭ slovarʹ. Moskva: ROSSPĖN. p. 11. ISBN 978-5-8243-1429-8.
