= Alexei Abrikosov (confectioner) =

Russian confectioner (1824–1904)

Alexei Ivanovich Abrikosov
- Алексей Иванович Абрикосов
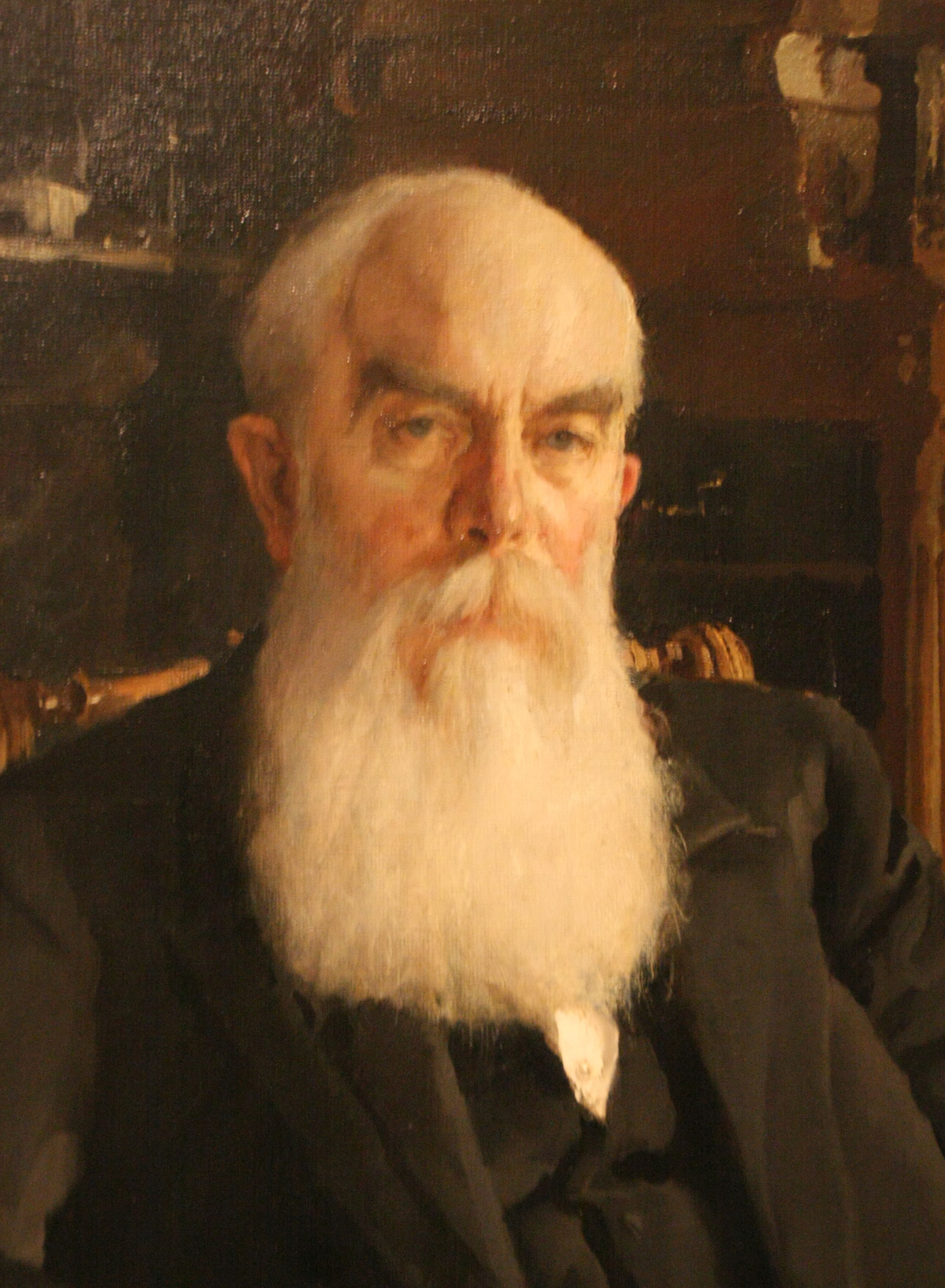
- Portrait by Valentin Serov, 1895
- Born: February 20, 1824; Moscow, Russia
- Died: January 31, 1904 (aged 79); Moscow, Russia
- Occupations: Entrepreneur; manufacturer

Alexei Ivanovich Abrikosov (Russian: Алексе́й Ива́нович Абрико́сов; March 3 [O.S. February 20] 1824 — February 13 [O.S. January 31] 1904) was a Russian entrepreneur and manufacturer who founded the Abrikosov & Sons Factory and Trade Association (now Babayevsky). He was also the owner of confectionery and tea shops in Moscow, a supplier to the imperial court, chairman of the board of the Accounts Bank. He held of the position of Active State Councillor.

According to one version, he was the first creator of Kinder Surprise.

== Biography ==
Alexei Abrikosov was born in 1824 in Moscow. Alexey's family created sweets for sale, mostly apricot jam and apricot paste, hence his surname. They also made gingerbread and sweets.

Alexei studied at a prestigious trade educational institution – the Practical Academy of Commercial Sciences; however, he did not complete his studies.

He was an employee until he was 23, then he started his own business.

Abrikosov was a benefactor of Moscow. During the Crimean War, he made donations to hospitals. With the help of his money, the church of Elijah the Prophet was rebuilt in the village of Izvarino near Moscow, and a parish school appeared there.

Abrikosov died in 1904 in Moscow. He is buried in the cemetery of the Alekseevsky Monastery. The cemetery has since been devastated.

== Family ==
In 1849, he married the daughter of Alexander Musatov, a major Moscow confectioner and perfumer. They had 10 sons and 12 daughters.
