= Theresa Kugel =

Russian nun

Sister Theresa Kugel, OP (1912, Orekhovo-Zuyevo, Moscow Governorate, Russian Empire – 2 December 1977, Vilnius, Lithuanian SSR, Soviet Union), was a convert from Orthodox Judaism to the Russian Catholic Church, a Byzantine Rite Dominican nun in the community founded by Mother Catherine Abrikosova, and a Gulag survivor. Her birth name was Minna Rahmielovna Kugel (Минна Рахмиэловна Кугель).

== Early life ==
Mina Rakhmielovna Kugel was born in 1912 into the family of a rabbi and grew up in Kostroma, where her father ran an illegal and underground synagogue in defiance of both Soviet anti-Judaism and anti-religious legislation. According to Walter Kolarz, the spread of atheist propaganda and the religious persecution of Soviet Jews was generally assigned at the time to the Yevsektsiya, or Jewish sections, of the Soviet Communist Party and its main institutions. For example, the Jewish section inside the League of Militant Godless, "had a total of 40,000 Jewish members in 1929, the year when the anti-religious campaign was at its peak. These 'Jewish sections' were much despised by the bulk of Russia's Jewry. Their members were regarded with as much contempt as the Jewish renegades who turned persecutors of the own brethren in the Middle Ages."

Minna Kugel's parents and siblings were later described as, "good and decent people, faithful to all the precepts of the Jewish religion". Mina, however, grew up feeling torn between the Orthodox Jewish values of her family and the coercive indoctrination into both Marxist-Leninism and Atheism through the Soviet educational system. According to Fr. Georgii Friedman, a young Mina Kugel was a member of the Young Pioneers and the Komsomol.

In 1929, a 15-year old Mina Kugel graduated from high school in Yaroslavl, and returned to her parents in Kostroma, where she became closely acquainted with two of her father's boarders, Stephanie Gorodets and Margarita Krylevskaya. Both women were nuns of the Moscow community of the Third Order of Saint Dominic which had been founded in August 1917 by Mother Catherine Abrikosova. Until this time, Mina Kugel had never before been exposed to Christianity.

== Conversion ==
In 1930, Mina was staying with her uncle in Yaroslavl and undergoing treatment for pulmonary tuberculosis. Out of curiosity, she went into a local Roman Catholic parish while Fr. Josif Josiukas was offering a Solemn High Mass followed by Eucharistic Adoration. After the Mass, Mina Kugel was looking at the Blessed Sacrament exposed in the Monstrance when she was overwhelmed by a new belief in the Real Presence and burst into tears. She left the church transformed into a completely different person.

In 1931, Mina Kugel, who now desired only to become a Catholic, travelled to Moscow and stayed with her relatives. She was secretly baptized into the Russian Greek Catholic Church, with Nora Rubashova as her godmother, by the former Symbolist poet Fr. Sergei Solovyov. Mina Kugel took the Christian name of Theresa, in honor of St. Thérèse of Lisieux. Many years later, her spiritual director, Fr. Georgii Friedman, would compare Mina Kugel's conversion story with those of André Frossard and Hermann Cohen.

Kugel's illness was considered hopeless and the doctors had reportedly given up on her. But after Bishop Pie Eugène Neveu gave her a flask of water from Lourdes, Kugel was cured and the doctors were allegedly unable to explain why.

== Dominican vocation ==
One day in August 1932, Kugel was on her knees in prayer after making her Confession at St Louis Church when Bishop Neveu left the Confessional, took Kugel by the hand, and led her to the pew of Anna Abrikosova, a woman she had never met before. The Bishop said, "Mother, here is one more daughter for you." Mass was about to begin, so without saying a word, Abrikosova kissed Kugel on the cheek, after with they heard the Mass together.

After Mass, Abrikosova said, "Well, now let's get acquainted." As she had been qualified as minus 12 upon her recent release from the Gulag, Abrikosova could not remain in Moscow and chose instead to reside with Sister Margaret in Kostroma, where the Kugel family also lived, and where Theresa regularly visited her.

According to Ejsmont, "Theresa loved Mother and was happy that she could see her every day, dropping by to visit after work. Mother always greeted her with an affectionate smile, bright and clear. She was always modestly dressed; a black skirt with a modest white blouse with black stripes. Despite her modest attire, Mother Catherine always looked stately. Her conversation was always amiable and sweet. Her whole appearance exuded an extraordinary charm... Sister Margaret worried over Mother, but Mother just smiled at this. In all her conversations one could sense her great love for the person with whom she was speaking and that person's soul, and when she spoke of God and the Gifts of the Holy Spirit, she earnestly and with such ardor, it was clear she herself was deeply filled with all these gifts."

When Sister Margaret once warned her of the enormous dangers posed by Kugel's regular visits, Abrikosova, whose cancer had recently returned, replied, "For the good and salvation of just a single soul, I am willing to go to prison again and to save the soul of this little Theresa, I am ready for another ten year term."

According to Sister Philomena Ejsmont, the Kugel family only learned of Mina's conversion in late 1932, shortly after her father was arrested and sent to the Gulag with the other men involved in organizing their underground synagogue. According to Sister Philomena, "No one at Theresa 's House knew that she had become a Christian and been baptized, but her sister once noticed her wearing a cross around her neck and told her mother. A grand brawl broke out, with shouts and curses. The mother left the house and Theresa taking almost nothing with her, headed for the train station, intending to leave home forever. The mother soon returned and, hearing what had happened, took off for the train station, where she found Teresa already seated in a train that was about to depart. Her mother begged her to return, but Theresa was adamant in her decision and left for Moscow. Once there, she sought advice from Bishop Neveu, who sent her to join the sisters in Krasnodar."

In 1932 she moved to Krasnodar, where she was assigned to beginning her postulancy under Sisters Magdalina Krylevslaya and Joanna Gotovtseva, and was tonsured as a Dominican nun with the name Teresa. According to Sister Philomena, "Sister Theresa settled in with them. There was no furniture in the room other than a night table and a wooden trestle bed. A little altar had been arranged on the night table, and the bed stood uncovered. They slept on the floor and ate in the landlady's kitchen." Kugel was later to recall Sister Magdalina, who had charge over her spiritual formation, as, "strict in the fulfillment of the Rule and Constitution of the Community", but also as, "a woman of extraordinary goodness and warmth".

== Gulag ==
On 6 October 1933 in Krasnodar, Kugel arrived at the prison with a parcel for Sisters Magdalina and Joanna, who had just been arrested. Kugel, who was wearing only a very light dress at the time, was arrested, too. When she was placed with the other two sisters, Sister Magdalina, who was her immediate superior, took off her own coat and gave it to Kugel. When Kugel tried to protest, Sister Magdalina smiled and replied, "Don't worry, my mother will look out for me." While the three sisters were being taken to Butyrskaya prison in Moscow, the NKVD guards gave them nothing to eat along the way. Eventually, Sister Magdalina arranged for one of the convoy escorts to buy them some bread. Even though Sisters Theresa and Joanna pleased with her to divide the bread equally, Sister Magdalina insisted on taking only a tiny piece for herself and giving the other two nuns the rest.

According to Sister Philomena Ejsmont, "When they arrived at the Moscow prison, they were not taken to a cell right away. Sister Magdalina told Sister Theresa, who had never been arrested prior to this time, what kinds of questions the investigators would ask, how to answer them, how to behave during interrogations and in general gave them a lot of very valuable advice. With deep grief, the Sisters later learned that Sister Magdalina, right after being placed in a solitary cell, died in the prison hospital on January 27, 1934. Thus she went to heaven possessing nothing but the dress she was wearing."

In what the NKVD called "The Case of the Counterrevolutionary Terrorist-Monarchist Organization", Mother Catherine Abrikosova, Theresa Kugel, and all their fellow nuns stood accused of forming a "terrorist organization", plotting to assassinate Joseph Stalin, overthrow the Communist Party of the Soviet Union, and restore the House of Romanov as a constitutional monarchy in concert with "international fascism" and "Papal theocracy". It was further alleged that the nuns planned to restore Capitalism and for collective farms to be privatized and returned to the kulaks and the Russian nobility. The NKVD further alleged that the nuns' terrorist activities were directed by Bishop Pie Eugène Neveu, the Vatican's Congregation for the Oriental Churches, and Pope Pius XI. On 19 February 1934, Kugel was declared guilty as charged and sentenced to 3 years in a labor camp. Kugel was released on 16 November 1935.

After December she lived in Bryansk and in October 1937 moved to Maloyaroslavets. Following Operation Barbarossa early in World War II, Maloyarolavets was occupied by Nazi Germany and, along with fellow Soviet Jewish Sister Nora Rubashova, Sister Theresa survived the Holocaust in Russia by working as a nurse in a German military hospital. Whenever possible, both sisters attended the Masses offered by Wehrmacht military chaplains and knelt at the Communion Rail alongside German soldiers who were fully aware of their Jewish ancestry.

Many years later, Secular Tertiary Ivan Lupandin asked Nora Rubashova why one of the Catholic military chaplains, whom she jokingly called a Hochdeutsch for his staunch belief in German nationalism, never reported her or Sister Theresa's Jewishness to the Gestapo or the SS. Rubashova replied, "Well, he was a Catholic priest. He was nationalistic, but not that nationalistic."

After Maloyaroslavets was liberated by Red Army, Sister Theresa Kugel, despite her Jewishness, was arrested by the NKVD on charges of collaboration with Nazi Germany. According to Ivan Lupandin, the NKVD's logic was that Sister Theresa must have been a collaborator because, "how else could she have worked in a hospital and not been shot by the Nazis?"

On 31 October 1942, she was declared guilty and sentenced to five years of "corrective labor" in Temlag for being a "socially dangerous element".

She was released on 25 March 1947 and returned to live in Maloyaroslavets. In the autumn of next year she moved to Kaluga. On 3 April 1949 Kugel she was arrested on charges of espionage for the Vatican. On 2 July 1949 she refused to sign the indictment and accordingly fell victim of the Political abuse of psychiatry in the Soviet Union. Sister Theresa was declared "psychologically incompetent" and, on 17 September, she was sent for involuntary treatment to a special hospital run by the MVD in Kazan. On 15 October 1952, Theresa Kugel was transferred to an ordinary psychiatric hospital and was finally released following the death of Joseph Stalin in 1953.

== Vilnius ==
She moved to Vilnius and, while working as a cleaning woman and later as a nurse, Sister Theresa became the driving force in the monastic revival of the Dominican community. She arranged for official invitations for the surviving sisters to come and live with her inside a Khrushchyovka apartment building on Dzuku Street.

Georgii Friedman, a Soviet Jewish jazz musician and recent Catholic convert, first visited them in 1974 and found that the Sisters were being covertly ministered to by Dominican Friars visiting from the People's Republic of Poland and by Fr. Volodymyr Prokopiv, a fellow Gulag survivor and priest of the illegal and underground Ukrainian Greek Catholic Church.

Friedman later recalled, "I remember how the atmosphere of quiet and peace in their quarters delighted me. On the walls hung large images of Saint Dominic and Saint Catherine of Siena. In the tiniest little chapel they had made an altar put of a dresser, and on the altar stood a crucifix. A lamp flickered in a beautiful vessel to show that the Blessed Sacrament was reserved there."

Friedman also recalled, "Sister Teresa, sixty-two years old, was tall, stocky, and plain. Her face reflected a selfless faith. She was then still working as a nurse in the hospital."

== Death ==
In 1977, Mina Kugel was hospitalized with terminal bladder cancer. Soon after, Georgii Friedman and Fr Volydymyr Prokopiv arrived to visit her. Fr. Friedman later recalled, "From her frightfully changed, corpse-like face, her eyes looked upon me, radiant with love and joy. I quickly left the room because I was afraid I would begin to cry."

When he returned, Friedman overheard Mina asking Father Prokopiv, "Father, why are they prolonging my sufferings with these pills?" Father Prokopiv bent over her and softly asked, "Do you not want to suffer a bit more for the sake of the salvation of souls?"

According to Friedman, "'I do', she quietly answered, and thereafter not a single complaint fell from her lips."

Mina Kugel died during surgery in Vilnius in 1977. Soon after her death, her fellow Soviet Jewish convert and former spiritual protege Georgii Friedman, was accepted into an illegal seminary, attended, and graduated. In 1979, Friedman was ordained as the first priest of the Russian Greek Catholic Church present on Soviet soil in decades by an underground bishop of the Ukrainian Greek Catholic Church.

== Sources ==
- I. Osipova 1996. S. 178; I. Osipova 1999. S. 333, the investigative case Abrikosov and others 1934 / / CA FSB RF, Investigative deal LB Ott and others / / TSLFSB Russia.
