= Armand Charles Guilleminot =

French major-general

Major-general Armand Charles Guilleminot
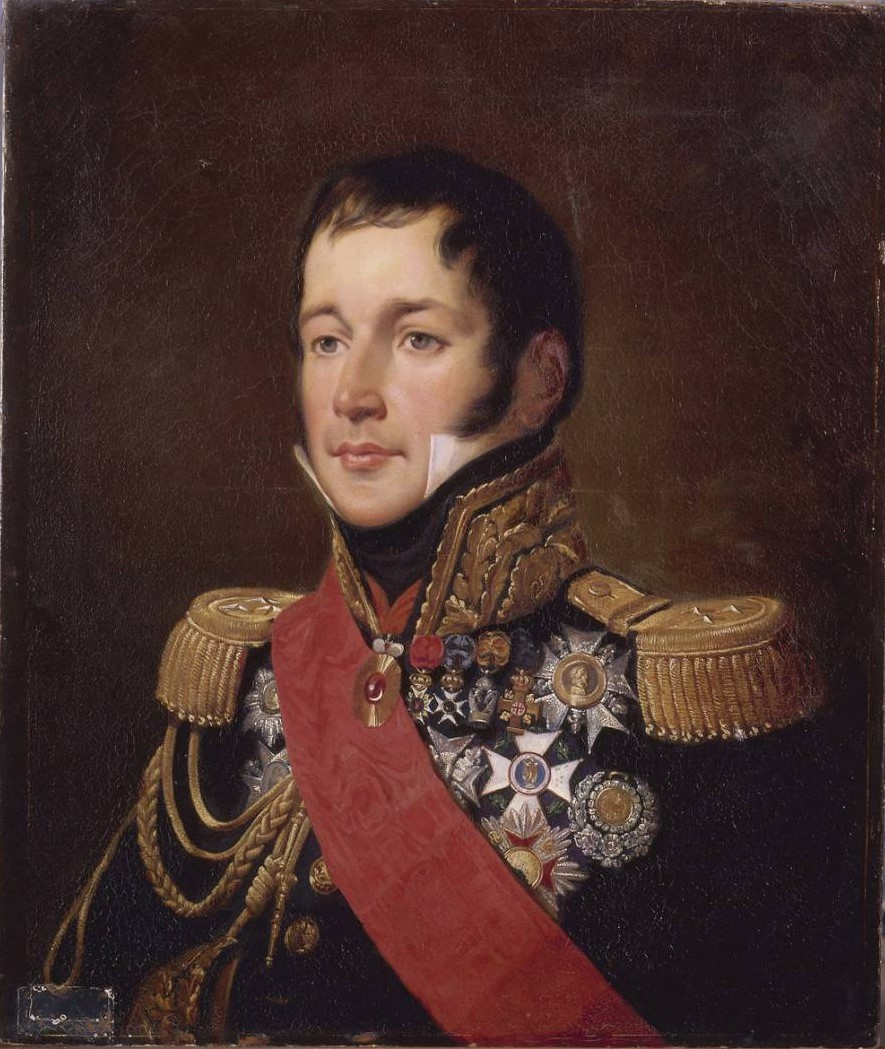
- Portrait of Armand Charles Guilleminot by Louise Adélaïde Desnos, 1843
- Born: 2 March 1774; Dunkirk, Kingdom of France
- Died: 14 March 1840 (aged 66); Grand Duchy of Baden
- Burial place: Père Lachaise Cemetery
- Military career
- Allegiance: Napoleon Bonaparte; Kingdom of France
- Service years: 1789–1840
- Rank: Divisional general
- Conflicts: Brabant Revolution; French Revolutionary Wars; Battle of Verona; Napoleonic Wars; Battle of Medina de Rioseco; Battle of Borodino; Battle of Maloyaroslavets; Hundred Days; Battle of Waterloo

Armand Charles Guilleminot (English: /ɡiːjəmiːˈnoʊ/ ghee-yə-mee-NOH, French: [aʁmɑ̃ ʃaʁl ɡijəmino]; 2 March 1774–14 March 1840) was a French major general during the Napoleonic Wars. He is described as having been very intelligent, merciful, generous, resourceful, and experienced. He achieved the Legion of Honour's grand-croix title, the highest rank of the award.

== Biography ==
Guilleminot was born on 2 March 1774 in Dunkirk, France, to Burgundian Claude Guilleminot and his wife Isabel-Barbe Lanscotte/Landschoote. He had 7 siblings: Anne (c. 1771), Julie-Ann (c. 1776), Marie-Françoise (c. 1777), Amable-Joseph-Claude (c. 1778), Pierre-Marie (c. 1779), Isabelle (c. 1781), and Adélaïde-Thérèse (c. 1783).

He entered the army in July 1789 at age 15 when he volunteered for the 9th Battalion of the National Guard of Dunkirk to fight the House of Austria, including in the Brabant Revolution. In 1792, he was made a sous-lieutenant in the 4th Battalion of Volunteers of Nord. He then served in the Army of the North under Dumouriez, working as aide-de-camp to General Souham at the Battle of Tourcoing. After Dumouriez's defection in 1793, Guilleminot was jailed in Lille on suspicion of treason. Following his stint in prison, he joined the Army of Sambre and Meuse and became a lieutenant (1796) and later a captain (1797); he then moved to the Army of Mainz. Guilleminot participated in the Battle of Verona in 1799 and was promoted to battalion commander by General Schérer. General Moreau also recognized his military excellence and called him up to the Army of Italy to serve as his aide-de-camp. He also served with the Army of the Rhine in its final years. Due to his close relationships with Generals Moreau and Pichegru, he was again regarded with suspicion following an assassination attempt on Cadoudal during the Pichegru Conspiracy in the early 19th century.

In 1802, Guilleminot was working in cartography services that were an attaché to the German Army. In 1805, he moved to the historical and geographic services and was subsequently sent to Dresden, Germany to work as an engineer and cartographer for the military. He then re-joined the Grande Armée under Marshal Berthier during the War of the Fourth Coalition. After the war ended, he traveled to Turkey to inform the Ottoman Empire of the Treaties of Tilsit between France and Russia.

In 1808, he was the first Frenchman sent to Bayonne, Spain for the Peninsular War, where he became chief of staff to Marshal Bessières and of the Army of the Western Pyrenees. He was present at the Dos de Mayo Uprising in Madrid, where he held back those pushing back against French rule, as well as the Battle of Medina de Rioseco, after which he was promoted to brigadier general. Shortly after, he was named Baron of the Empire and became Soult's chief of staff for the II Corps. In 1810, he was chief of staff of the Army of Catalonia. The same year, he became the German Army's chief of topography services, where he worked alongside Marshal Berthier during the Danube campaign.

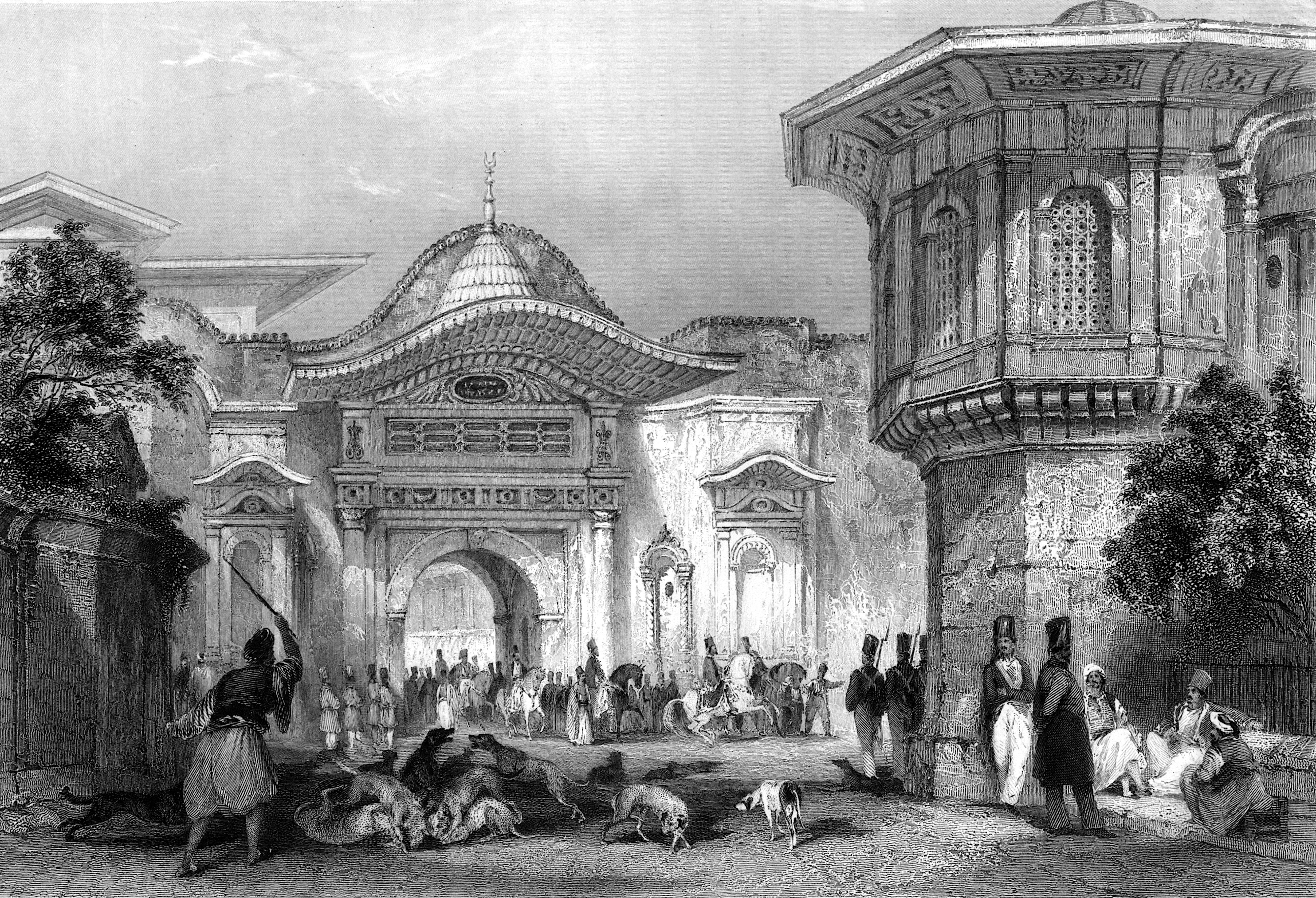
Rendering of the Sublime Porte entrance, Thomas Allom, c. 1840

In 1812, he became chief of staff to Prince Eugène's IV Corps. He was wounded in the Battle of Borodino but took charge of the 84th Infantry Regiment at the Battle of Maloyaroslavets only a month later after General Delzons' battlefield death. He led this regiment through the Battles of Vyazma and Krasnoi before the armies retreated in early 1813. The next Year he became a major-general after showing mercy at the Combat of Roßlau. He then took over the XII Corps from Marshal Oudinot and led them into battle in Großbeeren and the Dennewitz. He became the commander of the 13th Division and subsequently worked with both the VII Corps and the IV Corps, and led his men into battle at Hanau and Mainz.

Napoleon Bonaparte abdicated in 1814 and was exiled to the Italian island of Elba as per the Treaty of Fontainebleau. Guilleminot was appointed to chief of staff to Charles Ferdinand, Duke of Berry by Marshal Davout in the meantime. When Bonaparte escaped exile and returned to power in 1815, Guilleminot was made chief of general staff of the 3rd Observation Corps and later the grand quartier général impérial in the Army of the North. Days before the Battle of Waterloo, Guilleminot moved to serve in the Hundred Days battle as second-in-command of Jérôme Bonaparte's division. Following this loss, Guilleminot was sent to negotiate the surrender of Paris to Prussian leader Marshal von Blücher. He was kept as prisoner until the Convention of Saint-Cloud was complete, which is against military law. He was a signee of the convention along with Bignon, de Bondy, von Müffling, and Hervey-Bathurst.

At this point, Guilleminot transitioned from an active military career into a more administrative capacity. He was deeply interested in Freemasonry and studied it in his retirement. In 1816 and 1817, he worked to set French/Swiss land boundaries and in 1818 became part of the kingdom's defense commission. In 1821, he became the great standard-bearer of the Conseil d'État and in 1822, he was director of the war depot and aided in its reorganization. In 1823, during France's Spanish campaign, he became chief of staff to the duke of Angoulême and handled the military initiatives. He was also made the major-general of the Army of the Pyrenees. Later that year, King Louis XVIII gave him control of the French Embassy in Constantinople, where he served as ambassador for nearly 10 years. While there, he worked with Sultan Mahmut II on Ottoman reformations. In 1831, he returned to France and became the chairman of the border commission of the eastern French borders following the July Revolution. He also joined the new defense commission in 1836.

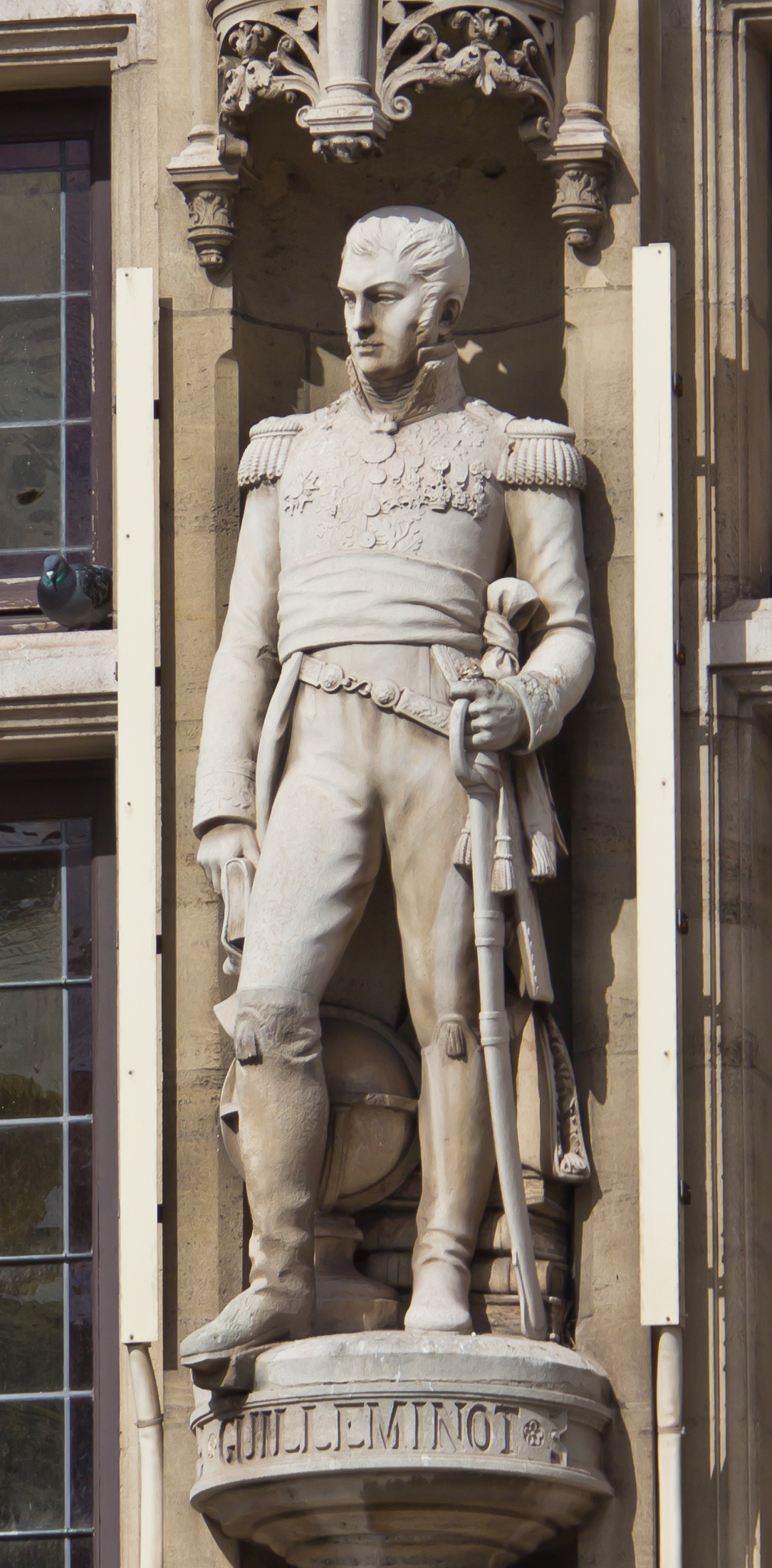
A statue of Guilleminot on the facade of the Hôtel de Ville (town hall) in Dunkirk

== Personal life ==
In 1798, Guilleminot married Aimée de Fernig, the sister of General de Fernig. They had four children: Charles Elie Théophile Léonidas Amé Guilleminot (1802—?), Eugène (1806—1825), Henriette Aimée (1811—1882), and Augustine Hortense (1812—1849). Henriette-Aimée was married to Édouard-Léon, Count Roger of the North; Augustine-Hortense was married to French diplomat Jules-Émile Humann and they had at least one son, Edgar Humann. When Aimée died in 1837, he remarried Henriette-Aimée "Marie" Ebray, the following year. Her first marriage was to the son of Nicholas Villeroy; they had at least one son, Nicolas-Henry-Charles, before Villeroy died in 1830.

Guilleminot suffered from illness for a long time and eventually went to Baden, Germany for a change of air, hoping it would help. However, he died on 14 March 1840 at age 66 of "an inflammation of the chest." He is buried at Père Lachaise Cemetery in Paris.

== Honours ==
Following the Battle of Medina in 1808, he was awarded the officer's cross for the Legion of Honour. In 1810, he was recognized as a Commander of the Iron Crown and a knight of the Military Order of Max Joseph. In 1814, the king appointed him a grand officer of the Legion of Honour and a knight of Order of Saint Louis. In 1823, he was made a Peer of France in recognition of his services. In 1823, he was made a grand cordon in the Legion of Honour and a commander in the Order of Saint Louis. In 1838, he was honoured with the Legion of Honour for the fourth time, this time at the rank of grand-officer. He was also made a saltier in the Order of the Crescent.

There is a statue of Guilleminot outside of Dunkirk's town hall.
