= Mozhaysky District, Moscow Oblast =

Mozhaysky District Можайский район (Russian)
- District
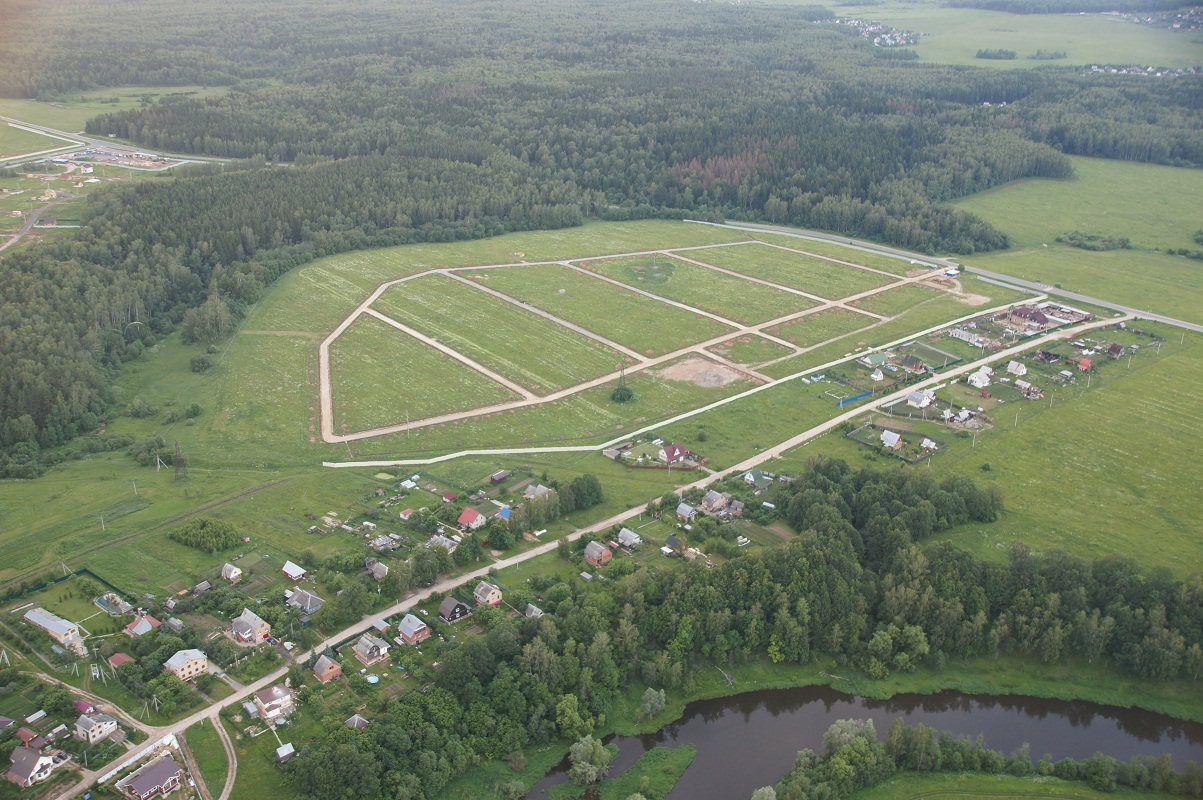
- Village Tikhonovo, Mozhaysky District

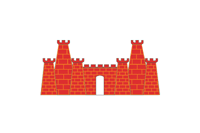
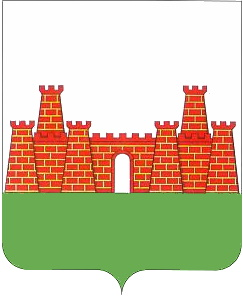
- Flag Coat of arms
- Location of Mozhaysky District in Moscow Oblast (before July 2012)
- Coordinates: 55°30′N 36°02′E
- Country: Russia
- Federal subject: Moscow Oblast
- Established: 1929
- Administrative center: Mozhaysk

Area
  - Total: 2,627.28 km^{2} (1,014.40 sq mi)

Population (2010 Census)
  - Total: 72,745
  - Density: 27.688/km^{2} (71.712/sq mi)
  - Urban: 47.7%
  - Rural: 52.3%

Administrative structure
  - Administrative divisions: 1 Towns, 1 Work settlements, 9 Rural settlements
  - Inhabited localities: 1 cities/towns, 1 urban-type settlements, 356 rural localities

Municipal structure
  - Municipally incorporated as: Mozhaysky Municipal District
  - Municipal divisions: 2 urban settlements, 9 rural settlements
- Time zone: UTC+3 (MSK)
- OKTMO ID: 46633000
- Website: http://www.admmozhaysk.ru/

Mozhaysky District (Russian: Можа́йский райо́н) is an administrative and municipal district (raion), one of the thirty-six in Moscow Oblast, Russia. It is located in the west of the oblast and borders with Smolensk Oblast in the west, Kaluga Oblast in the south, Shakhovskoy District in the north, Volokolamsky District in the northeast, Ruzsky District in the east, and with Naro-Fominsky District in the southeast. The area of the district is 2,627.28 square kilometers (1,014.40 sq mi). Its administrative center is the town of Mozhaysk. Population: 72,745 (2010 Census); 70,303 (2002 census); 42,593 (1989 Soviet census). The population of Mozhaysk accounts for 43.1% of the district's total population.

== Geography ==
The territory of the district is mostly hilly with the highest point of about 310 meters (1,020 ft) above sea level. Major rivers include the Moskva, the Protva, the Luzha, and the Vorya. Mozhaysk Reservoir is located in the district. About 42% of the district's territory is covered by forests.

== History ==
The district was established in 1929.

== Governance ==
The structure of local government bodies of the Mozhaysky District is:

- Council of Deputies (representative body); consists of 17 deputies elected in municipal elections on the basis of universal, equal, and direct suffrage by secret ballot for a period of 5 years.
- Head of the district; elected by citizens living in the territory of the district and having the right to vote on the basis of universal, equal, and direct suffrage by secret ballot for a period of 5 years;
- Administration of the district (executive and administrative body);
- Chamber of Control and Accounts district (control body).

According to the results of the elections on 1 March 2009, the Council of Deputies of the Mozhaysky District has the following party composition:

Партии	2009	2014	2021
United Russia	8	9	15=
Communist Party of the Russian Federation	4	5	2=
A Just Russia	3	-	1=
Liberal Democratic Party of Russia	2	1	2=
Russian Party of Pensioners for Social Justice	-	1	-
Total	17	16	20=
