= Alexis Joseph Delzons =

French general

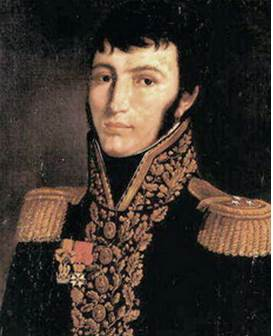
Alexis Joseph Delzons by an unknown artist

Alexis Joseph Delzons (French pronunciation: [alɛksi ʒozɛf dɛlzɔ̃]; 1775 – October 24, 1812) was a French general of the French Revolutionary Wars and the Napoleonic Wars. He was killed in the Battle of Maloyaroslavets. His surname is one of the names inscribed under the Arc de Triomphe, on Column 16.

== French Revolutionary Wars ==
Born in Aurillac in 1775, Delzons enlisted in a battalion of volunteers from the département of the Cantal as a lieutenant of grenadiers. He served in the campaigns of 1792 and 1793 in the Army of the Eastern Pyrenees during which he distinguished himself at Jonquière, where he was wounded, and in the Siege of Rosas.

Transferred to the Army of Italy, Delzons distinguished himself at Montenotte, Dego and Lodi. Captured near Mantua he was exchanged eight days later. After having distinguished himself in the Battle of Rivoli, Delzons was promoted to chef de bataillon on the field of battle.

Taking part in Napoleon Bonaparte’s Egyptian campaign, at the age of 23 Delzons was promoted to the command of a demi-brigade.

== Napoleonic Wars ==
Promoted to general of brigade upon his return to France, Delzons took part in the campaigns of 1805 and 1806. Serving under Auguste de Marmont, Delzons took part in the 1809 Dalmatian campaign. On 15 February 1811 Delzons was promoted to general of division. During Napoleon’s 1812 invasion of Russia, Delzons commanded a division in the corps of Eugène de Beauharnais. He distinguished himself at Ostrovno and Borodino. After Napoleon left Moscow, Delzons commanded the lead units going to the village of Maloyaroslavets. Having repaired the bridges over the Luzha River, Delzons attacked the heights on which the village rested. After being driven out of the village by a Russian counterattack, Delzons at the head of the 84th Line Infantry Regiment attempted to retake the village but fell dead, having been twice hit in the head by Russian bullets.
