= Rubashov =

Rubashov is a surname which can refer to

- Zalman Shazar (1889–1974), born Shneur Zalman Rubashov, Israeli politician, author and poet
- Nikolai Rubashov, the protagonist of the 1940 novel Darkness at Noon
- Martin Rubashov, the music project of Swedish singer Martin Boman
- Nora Rubashova (1909 – 1987) Catholic nun who converted from Judaism
