= Nora Rubashova =

Russian Catholic nun and convert from Judaism (1909–1987)

Nora Rubashova (12 March 1909 – 12 May 1987) was a Belarusian Catholic nun who converted from Judaism to the Russian Greek Catholic Church. Her monastic name was Catherine.

== Biography ==
Nora Rubashova was born in Minsk, Belarus, in a wealthy Orthodox Jewish family. In April 1926, under the influence of her high school teacher Tamara Sapozhnikova, she converted to Catholicism of the Byzantine Rite and took vows as a nun of the community of Sisters founded by Mother Catherine Abrikosova. Rubashova adopted the monastic name Catherine after Catherine of Siena.

According to Fr. Georgii Friedman, Rubashova's parents were heartbroken by her conversion and entrance into the Dominican Order. Her father, though, eventually came to terms with the fact. He used to joke whenever his daughter visited along with her fellow nuns, "Here come my in-laws!"

She studied at the Faculty of History and Philology of Moscow State University. Rubashova was a parishioner of former Russian Symbolist poet Fr. Sergei Solovyov, who offered the Divine Liturgy in the Old Church Slavonic liturgical language at the side altar dedicated to Our Lady of Ostrabrama inside what is now the Immaculate Conception Cathedral in Moscow.

Rubashova later recalled, "Father Sergey said [Divine Liturgy] each day at this altar, and on the eve of major feasts he observed the All Night Vigil. Rarely would one ever see so beautiful a Liturgy. The Church was large, tall, and unheated. Father Sergey's lips became bloodied from touching them every day to the freezing cold metal of the chalice."

Following the Great Turn, a government crackdown on religious practice made life in the parish ever more difficult. Nora Rubashova later recalled, "When [the Liturgy] in Slavonic was no longer permitted in the Church, Father Sergei continued to say [the Liturgy] in his friends' apartments. He also gave papers in their apartments; I remember his works on Sts Sergius of Radonezh, Serafim of Sarov, the unification of the Churches, and other theological themes. He has an excellent command of language, both in conversation and in scholarly works; his thinking was always original and deep, his speech was artistically gifted."

On 15 February 1931, she was arrested for belonging to the Russian Greek Catholic Church. On August 18, 1931 she was sentenced to 5 years of labor camps in the Mariinsky District, was released in 1936 and sent into exile in Michurinsk. In 1937, she left for Maloyaroslavets, where she joined the sisters, the remains of Anna Abrikosova's Dominican community.

After December she lived in Bryansk and in October 1937 moved to Maloyaroslavets. During World War II Maloyarolavets was occupied by Nazi Germany and, along with fellow Soviet Jewish Sister Theresa Kugel, Nora Rubashova survived the Holocaust in Russia by working as a nurse in a German military hospital. Whenever possible, both sisters attended the Masses offered by Wehrmacht military chaplains and knelt at the Communion Rail alongside German soldiers who were fully aware of their Jewish ancestry.

Many years later, Secular Tertiary Ivan Lupandin asked Rubashova why one of the Catholic chaplains, whom she jokingly called a Hochdeutsch for his staunch belief in German nationalism, never reported her or Sister Theresa's Jewishness to the Gestapo or the SS. Rubashova replied, "Well, he was a Catholic priest. He was nationalistic, but not that nationalistic."

In May 1944, Maloyaroslavets was liberated by the Red Army and Rubashova traveled to the Novo Shulba near Semipalatinsk, to help sister Stephanie Gorodets who was there in exile. Meanwhile, Sister Theresa Kugel, despite her Jewishness, was arrested by the NKVD on charges of collaboration with Nazi Germany. According to Ivan Lupandin, the NKVD's logic was that Sister Theresa must have been a collaborator because, "how else could she have worked in a hospital and not been shot by the Nazis?"

In 1947, together with Sister Stephanie, Rubashova returned to Maloyaroslavets, and in summer of 1948 moved to Kaluga. On 30 November 1948, she was re-arrested for belonging to the Russian Catholic Church and, on 29 October 1949, was sentenced to 15 years of labor camps. Rubashova was sent to Vorkuta Gulag and, in 1954, to Karlag, staying there until May 1956.

After her release from the Gulag during the Khrushchev thaw, Rubashova went to Moscow. Mother Stephania Gorodets soon joined her and they lived together in a small flat in a communal apartment building near the University Station of the Moscow metro. Nora Rubashova got a job at the State Historical Library, where she worked until retirement.

She attended the Church of Saint Louis, and united around her the surviving community of Russian Catholics. Her room became a meeting place for the sisters and the spiritual center of the new community, which later attracted young people, Moscow State University students, and Soviet dissidents. Visitors included the poet Arseny Tarkovsky. Sergey Averintsev and Anna Godiner, Furthermore, because Nobel Prize-winning Soviet dissident Alexander Solzhenitsyn interviewed Rubashova in Moscow during his research process, Mother Catherine Abrikosova and the persecution of her monastic community are mentioned briefly in the first volume of The Gulag Archipelago.

Following his illegal seminary training and secret ordination by an underground bishop of the Ukrainian Greek Catholic Church, the Moscow Catholic community arranged clandestine offerings of the Byzantine Rite Divine Liturgy beginning from October 1979 by a visiting Greek-Catholic priest from Leningrad, Fr. Georgii Friedman.

The May 1981 attempt on the life of Pope John Paul II by Mehmet Ali Ağca was devastating for Rubashova, who often prayed afterwards to the Sacred Heart for the Pope's healing and protection.

In her final years, Rubashova rejoiced in the beginning of glasnost and perestroika, but often said cautiously and in Gulag slang about Soviet Premier Mikhail Gorbachev, "I can believe any beast, but as for him -- I'll wait a bit."

Towards the end of her life, Rubashova often confided in fellow Dominican tertiary Anna Godiner, "I am alone a lot, and I simply sit and timidly talk with God." Compounding her loneliness was that Rubashova's brother and relatives emigrated to the United States under the Jackson-Vanik Amendment and settled in Brighton Beach.

Sister Nora Rubashova died on 12 May 1987 in Moscow, Russia, and was buried at the Khovanskoye cemetery near Moscow. A Byzantine Rite funeral Liturgy, or Panikhida, was secretly offered for the repose of her soul by Fr Georgii Friedman.

== Sources ==
" I. Osipova 1996. S. 195; I. Osipova 1999. S. 337, the investigative case SM Soloviev et al. 1931 / / TSAFSBRF; Investigation case AB Ott et al. / / CA FSB RF, Sokolovsky DC S. 174.
