= Zhanalyk =

Zhanalyk (Kazakh: Жаңалық) is the name of several villages in Kazakhstan.

- Zhanalyk, Akmola Region
- Zhanalyk, Aksu District, Jetisu Region
- Zhanalyk, Eskeldi District, Jetisu Region
- Zhanalyk, Kerbulak District, Jetisu Region
- Zhanalyk, North Kazakhstan Region
- Zhanalyk, Talgar District, Almaty Region
