= Karlag =

Gulag labor camp

Coordinates: 49°40′39″N 72°40′55″E

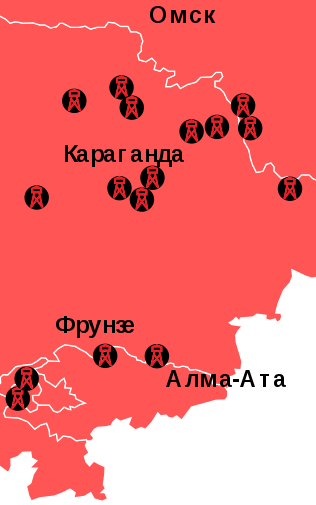
Karlag (by Karaganda) and other camps in the area

Karlag (Karaganda Corrective Labor Camp, Russian: Карагандинский исправительно-трудовой лагерь, Карлаг) was one of the largest Gulag labor camps, located in Karaganda Oblast (now Karaganda Region, Kazakhstan), Kazakh SSR, USSR. It operated during 1930—1959.

== History ==
It was established in 1931 during a period when more remote parts of the USSR were being settled. Cheap labour was in high demand for these purposes. People were arrested and transported from west of the Ural Mountains to the gigantic labor camp in central Kazakhstan spanning from Akmola Region in the north to the Chu River in the south. Later, after WWII, another wave of prisoners poured in, constituting Soviet former POWs held captive by the Nazis before the Red Army returned them to the Soviet Union. Many Karlag inmates were prisoners sentenced as "enemies of the people" under Article 58 RSFSR. Over 1,000,000 inmates in total served in Karlag over its history.

One of the main reasons for creating Karlag camp was the establishment of a large agricultural base supported by free labor for rapidly growing industry in central Kazakhstan - Karaganda Coal Basin in particular. The camp was founded on uninhabited empty steppe and grew fairly quickly within the first couple of years with the help of neighboring regions of the north and south. The total territory of Karlag was about 1,780,650 hectares (6,875 sq mi), out of which only 77,700 hectares (300 sq mi) was dedicated to agriculture, while the rest was used for pasture. As Karlag territory expanded, it absorbed some civilian settlements which included ethnic Russians, Ukrainians and Germans who had moved to the area between 1906-1907. As a result, in 1931 those civilian settlements were forced to relocate by NKVD forces. Collectivization of the steppe, forced relocation, and confiscation pushed them to the city of Karaganda and its neighboring regions. Karaganda was just starting to build coal mines, so many of these resettled people were used as cheap labor. Confiscated sheep, camels, cattle, and horses were transported to the newly formed "Eastern Meats" (Vostok Myaso) organization, which processed it in order to feed the labor force. The empty lands of resettled people were soon filled with thousands of rows of inmates. Echelons of new prisoners came one after another from the central parts of the Russian SFSR. They quickly spread across the steppe building railroads, housing for livestock, housing for camp employees, barracks, and isolation units.

Karlag wardens answered only to Gulag NKVD in Moscow. No Soviet, state or local government organizations had any influence on the operations of the wardens and supervisors of the camp. It resembled a colony, with a heavy management apparatus. Its departments included: administrative-agricultural, planning and control, culture-educational, human resources, trade, supply-chain, transport, finance, political, medical, and more. In Karlag, the inmates' efforts built a meat-processing plant and a leather/fur-processing plant which produced leather products, furs and valenki.

== Modern times ==
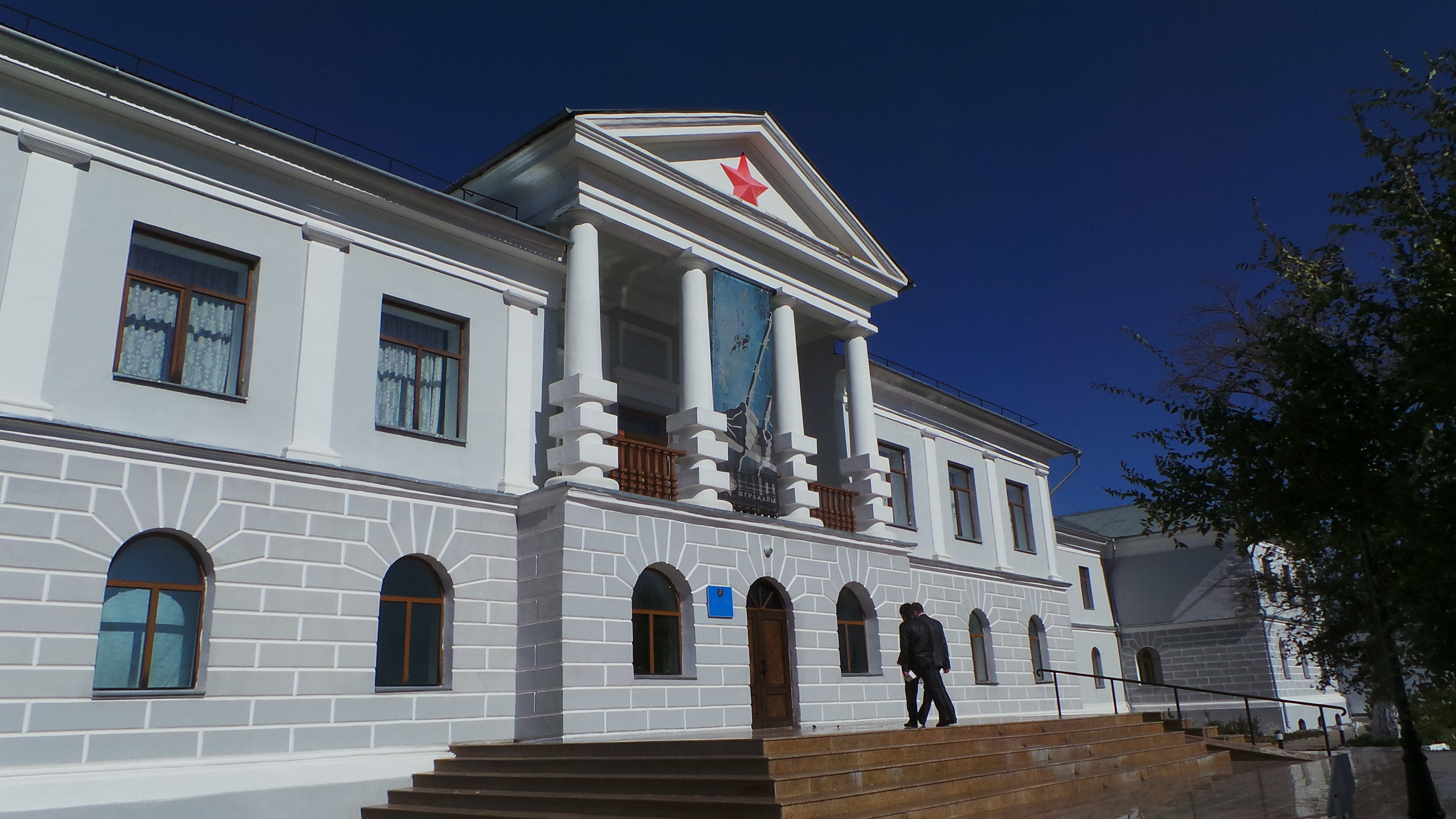
Karlag museum, currently in the former camp administration building

In 2001, a Karlag Museum was established in Dolinka, Karaganda Region.

In 2020, in the village of Zhanalyk near Almaty, Kazakhstan, local farmers excavated remains of at least 55 victims of NKVD executions.

== Notable inmates ==
- Nina Anisimova (dancer) (1909-1979), Soviet dancer and choreographer
- Arkadiy Belinkov (1921–1970), writer
- Margarete Buber-Neuman (1901–1989), German writer
- Alexander Chizhevsky (1897–1964), scientist
- Esther Frumkin (1880-1943), Belarusian Bundist revolutionary and publicist and Soviet politician
- Mikuláš Gacek (1895–1970), Slovak writer
- Alexander Grigoriev (1891–1961), painter
- Hanna Kohonen (1885-1944), Social Democratic Party of Finland politician, member of the Parliament of Finland
- Herminia Naglerowa in camp komandirovka in Burma .
- Vasile Pop (1921-2009), engineer
- Abilbek Nurmagambetov (1927-1998), Soviet and Kazakh linguist-etymologist
- Nora Rubashova (1909-1987) Belarusian Catholic nun
- Zinovy Shulman (1904-1977), Soviet Jewish singer
- Aleksandr Solzhenitsyn (1918–2008), author, critic of the Gulag system
- Ülo Sooster (1924-1970), Estonian modernist artist
- Tatu Bulach (1902-1980), participant in the struggle for the establishment of Soviet power in Dagestan and the first Komsomol woman in Dagestan
- Nikolay Urvantsev (1893–1985), geologist and explorer
