= Abilbek Nurmagambetov =

Soviet-Kazakh linguist and etymologist

- Әбілбек Нұрмағамбетов
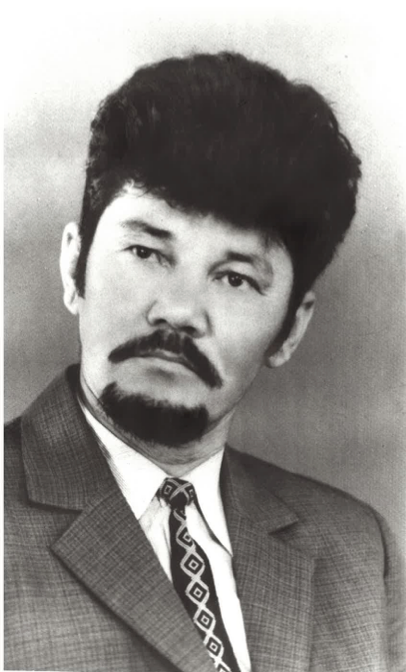
- Born: 29 December 1927; Zhartogai, Torgai region, Zhangeldi District, Kazakh ASSR, RSFSR, Soviet Union
- Died: 19 September 1998 (aged 70)
- Education: Abai Kazakh Pedagogical Institute
- Occupations: Linguist, etymologist
- Known for: Soviet and Kazakh linguist-etymologist
- Notable work: PhD thesis Kazakh dialects in Turkmen SSR, Doctoral dissertation Western dialectal group of Kazakh language

Abilbek Nurmagambetov (Kazakh: Әбілбек Нұрмағамбетов, Äbılbek Nūrmağambetov; Russian: Абильбек Нурмагамбе́тов; 29 December 1927 – 19 September 1998) was a Soviet and Kazakh linguist-etymologist.

== Biography ==
Nurmagambetov was born on 29 December 1927 in the settlement of Zhartogai, Torgai region, Zhangeldi District, in the Kazakh Autonomous Socialist Soviet Republic of the Russian SFSR (later Kazakh Soviet Socialist Republic), now in Kostanay Region in Kazakhstan.

After 9 classes of Altynsarin middle school of Torgai, he worked in 1943–44 as an accountant of Komintern kolkhoz, Torgai region, Semiozernyi division of Gosbank (State bank).

On April 17, 1946, at the age of 17, Nurmagambetov was arrested after citing a poem of Turgai-born Kazakh poet Akhmet Baitursynov (who was repressed and executed in 1937). The Kostanay court charged Nurmagambetov with the infamous Article 58 (RSFSR Penal Code) (58-10) of Political repression in the Soviet Union era and he was sentenced to 7 years of prison spent in Karlag.

In 1953 (coinciding with the Stalin's death), he was released and next year finished Semiozernyi Kazakh middle school and graduated Abai Kazakh Pedagogical Institute (1955–60). He worked as a teacher in Kaskelen school-internat until October 1961. From 1961 to 1964, he finished graduate school of Linguistics Institute of Kazakhstan Academy of Sciences, Almaty, and then worked as a junior researcher. On June 7, 1965 he received a PhD with the thesis Kazakh dialects in Turkmen SSR and on April 11, 1975 gave his doctoral dissertation Western dialectal group of Kazakh language.

== Publications ==
His publications explored Kazakh dialects and etymology of Kazakh words and their connections to other languages.

- Tyrikmenstandagi qazaqtardyn tili (Kazakh Dialects in Turkmen SSR), 1965, PhD thesis
- Kazak Tili Govorlarınıñ Batys Toby (Western group of dialects of Kazakh language"), 1978, Almaty: Kazak SSR Gylym Baspasy
- Jergiliki til erekshelikterinin torkini. Almaty, Mektep,1985
- Kazak Govorlarının Grammatikasy (Grammatics of Kazakh Dialects), 1986, Almaty: Gylym Baspasy
- Soz syryna sayahat. Almaty, Jalyn, 1990
- Qos sozderdin kypiyasy. Almaty, Jalyn, 1991
- Jer-sudin aty-tarihtyn hati (History of land and water names), 1994, Tarihtın Hatı, Almaty: Balausa Baspasy.
- Bes Jüz Bes Söz (Five Hundred and Five Words), 1994, Almaty: Rauan Baspasy
