= Tatu Bulach =

Avar revolutionary and Soviet politician (1902–1980)

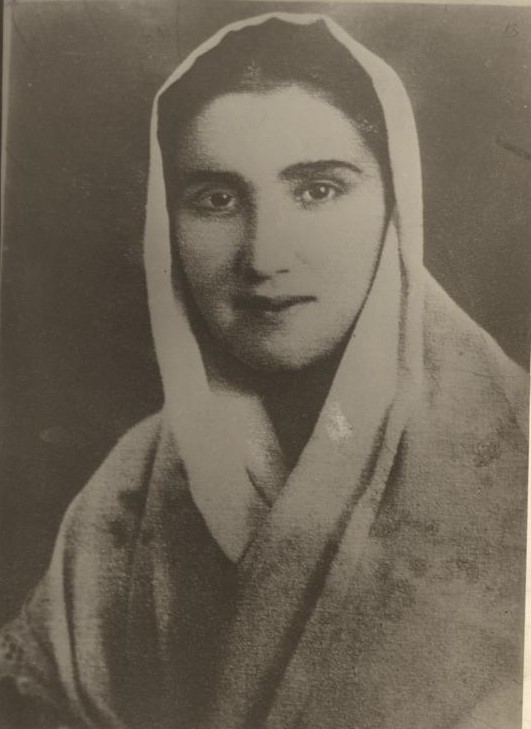

Chairman of the Dagestan Regional Committee of the Komsomol

Personal details
- Born: 1902 Nizhneye Kazanishche, Russian Empire (now Dagestan, Russia)
- Died: 1980 (aged 77–78) Makhachkala, Dagestan ASSR, Russian SFSR, Soviet Union (now Dagestan, Russia)
- Party: Communist Party of the Soviet Union
- Other political affiliations: Russian Social Democratic Labour Party
- Education: Plekhanov Russian University of Economics

Tatu Bulach (Avar: Тату Булач; Russian: Тату Омаровна Булач, romanized: Tatu Omarovna Bulach; 1902 – 1980) was an Avar communist revolutionary and Soviet politician. An important figure in the establishment of the Dagestan Autonomous Soviet Socialist Republic, she was the first Komsomol woman in Dagestan.

== Biography ==
She was born in the village of Nizhneye Kazanishche in the family of an officer of the Imperial Russian Army. Her father died suddenly at the age of 30, leaving a widow Aruv Azhay, a daughter Izumrud, a son Haji and a six month old Tatu. The family was poor, so Bulach had to work from the age of 13. She combined her work with her studies at the Temir-Khan-Shura Women's Gymnasium.

In the summer of 1915, when Tatu was 13 years old, her brother's friend Ullubiy Buynaksky came to visit their family. He became a frequent visitor to the Bulach family. After the October Revolution Buynaysky was arrested, and he corresponded with Bulach, who he also used to deliver letters by him to the outside world. In these hundreds of years old letters, against the backdrop of revolution and Russian Civil War, among the calls to fight to the bitter end, a tragic love story unfolds. During the civil war, Bulach was a supporter of the Red Army and participated in the establishment of the Dagestan Autonomous Soviet Socialist Republic.

In the spring of 1917, she became chairman of the Union of Revolutionary Muslim Youth, which united the student and working youth of the city. Soon she became a delegate to the first all-Caucasian congress of Muslim students, which was held in Baku in May 1917. She was the only one of the three female delegates elected as a member of the presidium of the congress.

In 1920, Bulach was elected chairman of the organizing bureau of the Komsomol for the preparation of a conference or congress of the Komsomol of Dagestan. In 1920-1921 she was elected a member of the Presidium of the Youth Council of the East, then she worked as a secretary of the Communist Party in Khasavyurt and Makhachkala.

In 1927 she graduated from the Plekhanov Russian University of Economics, after which she worked as an intern-referent in the People's Commissariat for Foreign Trade of the State Trade Committee of the USSR. In 1928–1929 she worked as an economist, and secretary of the export-import department of the USSR Trade Representation in Istanbul.

In 1932–1933 she studied at the Institute of Red Professors. In 1934 she worked at the Central Executive Committee of the Soviet Union under the Soviet of Nationalities as director of advanced training courses.

In 1935–1936 she worked as the director of the evening Academy. In 1937 – head of the department of educational institutions of the People's Commissariat of Nationalities of the RSFSR.

=== Repression ===
Then her life activity was interrupted, she was repressed for several years. The Soviet repressive system did not bypass her despite her communist activism. In 1937, she was arrested by the NKVD on charges of participating in a Trotskyist organization, and was convicted under Art. 58 p. 11 of the Criminal Code of the RSFSR (participation in counter-revolutionary activities) for 8 years of labor camp. She served her sentence in the Karaganda Corrective Labor Camp. She was released in 1946, But freedom did not last long: in 1948 she was again arrested on charges of espionage and transported to the Krasnoyarsk, then deported to the city of Yeniseisk. In 1955, accusations against Bulach were removed. In total she spent 16 years in prison, camps and exile.

On 31 December 1955, she was rehabilitated due to the lack of corpus delicti. On 31 December 1955, she was rehabilitated due to the lack of corpus delicti. She died in 1980 at the age of 78 and was buried in Makhachkala.

== See also ==
- Mashidat Gairbekova
