= Hanna Kohonen =

Finnish politician (1885–1944)

Hanna Kohonen (née Johanna Rönkkö; 11 October 1885 – 22 February 1944) was a female Social Democratic Party of Finland politician. She was a member of the Parliament of Finland from 1916 to 1918. She supported the Reds in the Finnish Civil War of 1918.

After the Red side was defeated, she fled to Soviet Russia. Kohonen was the editor of the Finnish-language newspaper Vapaus (not to be confused with the Finnish-Canadian newspaper Vapaus) in Petrograd in 1922 and taught the history of the Communist Party at the Communist University of the National Minorities of the West from 1923 to 1927.

In 1932, the Kohonens moved to Petrozavodsk, in the Karelian ASSR, where her husband Jalo Kohonen worked as a researcher at a scientific research institute and Hanna Kohonen was the chairman of the trade union committee of the Kustannusosuusliike Kirja publishers' union and from 1935, the librarian of the central library in Petrozavodsk.

Kohonen was arrested on December 23, 1937, accused of counter-revolutionary nationalist activity. She was sentenced to ten years in prison and was sent to the Karaganda Corrective Labor Camp in the Kazakh Soviet Socialist Republic, where she died in 1944.

She was rehabilitated in 1955.

Hanna and Jalo Kohonen had two daughters who lived near Moscow in the 1950s.

== Sources ==
- Hanna Kohonen. Edustajamatrikkeli. Kansanedustajat 1907 –. Eduskunta (Parliament of Finland). (in Finnish)
- KASNTn NKVDn vuosina 1937–1938 rankaisemien Suomen Eduskunnan entisten jäsenten luettelo
