= Mashidat Gajiyevna Gairbekova =

Avar author

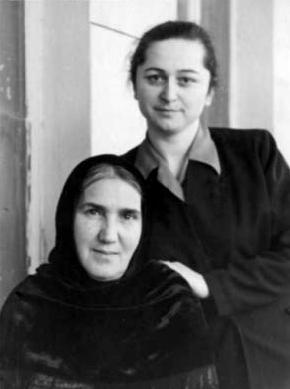
- Mashidat Gairbekova and Tatu Bulach, 1958
- Born: December 29, 1927; Karata
- Died: November 22, 2015 (aged 87)
- Occupations: Avar poet, writer, dramatist and public figure
- Known for: People's Poet of Dagestan
- Notable work: "The Word of a Goryanka", "On the Way to the Top"

Mashidat Gajiyevna Gairbekova (born 29 December 1927 in Karata; died 22 November 2015) was a Soviet and Russian Avar poet, writer, dramatist and public figure. She was named a People's Poet of Dagestan in 1969. Meshidat Qairbeyova made significant contributions to the development of Dagestani and Russian literature.

== Early life and education ==
Meshidat Qairbeyova was born in the Aukh district of Dagestan, USSR. She began writing poetry at a young age and was recognized as a poet during her school years. Qairbeyova wrote in both Avar and Russian. She graduated from the Maxim Gorky Literature Institute.

== Career ==
Qairbeyova's works were first published in 1948. She authored several plays, including "The Fight for Happiness" (1958), and poetry such as "The Distant Sister" (1954), "The Incomplete Letter" (1955), "The Bride’s White Veil" (1965), "Punishment for a Crime" (1967), and "The Red Partisan Girl" (1968). Her poetry collections "The Word of a Goryanka" (1952) and "On the Way to the Top" sketched life in rural Dagestan. Her poetry often focused on the theme of protecting the world.

== Personal life and legacy ==
Qairbeyova is described as having a strong character and a principled approach to issues of justice and women’s dignity. She is described as a true mountain woman who adhered to the principles of honor and integrity throughout her life. In her later years, she became interested in historical themes, particularly the life of Imam Shamil, a prominent figure in Dagestan’s history.

Qairbeyova was the head of the Avar Musical Drama Theater named after Tsadasa from 1969 to 1975. She was a member of the Union of Soviet Writers.

== Death ==
Meshidat Qairbeyova died on November 22, 2015, at the age of 88.

== Works ==
- The Word of Goryanka (1952)
- On the Way to the Top (1959)
- The Distant Sister (1954)
- The Incomplete Letter (1955)
- The Bride’s White Veil (1965)
- Punishment for a Crime (1967)
- The Red Partisan Girl (1968)

== Awards and recognition ==
Qairbeyova was honored with several prestigious awards, including the Suleiman Stalski State Prize. She was awarded two orders: the Order of the Red Banner of Labour and the Order of the Badge of Honour and held the title of People's Poet of Dagestan.

== See also ==
- Bulach Tatu
- Avar people
