= Arkadiy Belinkov =

Russian writer (1921–1970)

Arkadiy Viktorovich Belinkov
- Аркадий Викторович Белинков
- Born: September 29, 1921; Moscow
- Died: May 14, 1970 (aged 48); New Haven, Connecticut
- Education: Maxim Gorky Literature Institute
- Writing career
- Language: Russian

Arkadiy Viktorovich Belinkov (Russian: Арка́дий Ви́кторович Белинко́в; September 29, 1921, in Moscow, USSR – May 14, 1970, in New Haven, Connecticut) was a Russian writer and literary critic.

== Biography ==
Belinkov was born into a Jewish family from Gomel. His father, Viktor Lazarevich Belinkov (1901–1980), was a well-known economist; his mother, Mirra Naumovna Belinkova (1900–1971), was a scholar of children's literature. As a child, he was diagnosed with a heart condition and was unable to attend public school. Instead, he studied at home. He received his higher education at the Maxim Gorky Literature Institute and Moscow State University. During World War II, he was briefly employed as a correspondent for the Information Telegraph Agency of Russia. He wrote a number of literary works, including fiction and critiques.

In January 1944, during Joseph Stalin's rule, Belinkov wrote a novel called A Diary of Feelings that was tacitly circulated and read by friends and acquaintances. An anonymous informant leaked this information to the authorities, and Belinkov was arrested and initially sentenced to death. Aleksey Nikolayevich Tolstoy and Viktor Shklovsky interceded for him: the execution was replaced by eight years of imprisonment in Karlag (Karaganda Gulag branch). However, while serving his sentence in 1950–1951, Belinkov wrote some anticommunist articles, and his sentence was increased by 25 years.

Upon release from prison, Belinkov returned to Moscow in the autumn of 1956, during the Khrushchev Thaw. He returned to writing, but his literary works contained anti-Soviet pathos that was incompatible with the official dogma of the time. He was allowed, however, to work as a literary scholar, and his biographical/analytical work Yury Tynyanov was received so enthusiastically that two editions appeared in a short space of time.

In 1968 Belinkov and his wife Natalia fled the Soviet Union. After a while they arrived in the United States, at New Haven, Connecticut. He found work as a lecturer at several universities, including Yale.

Belinkov died on May 14, 1970, while undergoing a heart operation in New Haven, Connecticut. He is buried at the Holy Trinity Orthodox Church Cemetery in New Britain, Connecticut.

== Controversy ==
In Russia, his literary works were banned for many years. They were finally published in the 1990s.

== Themes ==
Belinkov dedicated his literary works to a number of Russian writers, notably Yury Tynyanov, Alexander Blok, and Yury Olesha. A constant theme in his creative works is the intelligentsia's place in Russian society.
