= Sergei Solovyov (Catholic priest) =

Russian poet (1885–1942)

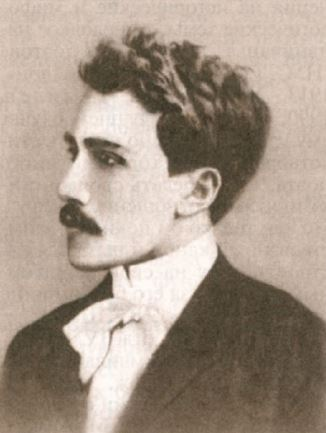

Father Sergei Mikhailovich Solovyov (October 25, 1885 in Moscow, Russian Empire – March 2, 1942 in Kazan, USSR) was a Russian Symbolist poet, religious philosopher and an Orthodox (later Greek Catholic) priest. Solovyov was a grandson of the historian Sergey Solovyov, a nephew of the poet and philosopher Vladimir Solovyov, second cousin of Alexander Blok, and a friend of Andrei Bely.

== Family ==
Born into the hereditary Russian nobility and the family of Mikhail Solovyov, who was the brother of the famous Russian philosopher Vladimir Solovyov, and the son of poet Polixena Solovyova and novelist Vsevolod Solovyov. Solovyov was also a second cousin of the Russian poet Alexander Blok, with whom he was connected. In September 1912 in the Church of the Nativity of the Virgin in the Nadovrazhnom village(Moscow Province) he married Tatiana Alekseevna Turgeneva. On August 25, 1913 his first daughter, Natalia, was born; in 1914, Mary (who died at the age of five); and, on July 28, 1916 his third daughter was born, Olga. Tatiana Turgeneva was later fascinated by Marxism; she later separated from her husband and remarried.

== Literary work ==
Solovyov studied at the Moscow private school Lev Polivanov. On January 16, 1903 both of Sergei Solovyov's parents died. In 1904 he entered into the verbal branch of the Faculty of History and Philology at Moscow State University, and in the autumn of 1907 he moved onto the Classical branch of the same Faculty, where he graduated with a first degree in the spring of 1911. Solovyov defended his thesis "Comments to the idyll of Theocritus."

Solovyov wrote poetry since childhood, in 1905 for the first time his poems and literary articles were published in the press. In 1907 his first book of poems was published, entitled "Flowers and Incense." Solovyov wrote philosophical and theological works, which were translated in other languages. In 1916, he reissued the poem of his brother Vladimir Solovyov, anticipating the collection of biographical essays, the epigraph to his word, he puts the Croatian Bishop Josip Juraj Strossmayer " Solovief Anima Candida, pia AC Vere sancta Est ". In 1926 he translated Adam Mickiewicz's Konrad Wallenrod from Polish to Russian. In 1928, he also worked on a translation of Virgil's Aeneid.

== The priestly ministry ==
In October 1913 Solovyov entered the second year of the Moscow Theological Academy in Sergiev Posad. Solovyov at this time was acquainted with Vasily Rozanov, Pavel Florensky and Vladimir Franzevich Ern. In 1915 he graduated from the Theological Academy, and on November 21, 1915 was ordained a deacon, and on February 2, 1916 a priest. Sergei Solovyov was early interest in Catholicism, to which undoubtedly influenced him his creativity uncle, Vladimir Solovyov, who shortly before his death, took communion from a Russian Catholic priest, although there is no evidence, as of 2022, to support the claim that he ever officially embraced Roman Catholicism. This interest has also contributed to the Vladimir Abrikosov's conversion to Catholicism. After long and painful pursuit, Father Sergei Solovyov makes a decision that will never become a Catholic, what wrote in his letter to Natalia Wrangell-Levitsky from October 14, 1916:

But then came the resolution, and you were right. I realized that I'll never be a Catholic. I saw clearly that I never want to change the sacred cause of unification of the churches, so impossible for me to pass the citizenship of the Pope, and I breathed freely feeding. / ... / And I saw clearly how everything dear to me in Catholicism faded would be for me if I broke with the Russian Church and the Vatican office podmahnul act of accession. / ... / I'm so glad that I was clear. Of course, more than once tempted to get up in front of me, but it's better to rot in prison persecuted Orthodox priest than shine in the Cardinal's purple. Of course, a Catholic I would open a wide path. But the path of Christ, "is narrow and regrettable"

However, in 1920, when Catholic Church in Russia, especially the Russian Greek Catholic Church, was persecuted, Solovyov joined the community of Russian Catholics of the Eastern rite, officially joined the Catholic Church in 1921. In 1922 he again returned to Orthodoxy, but in November 1923 finally reunited himself with the Catholic Church and became the pastor of the semi-underground Moscow community of Greek Catholics. From 1924, Solovyov led the Greek Catholics of Moscow in worship inside the Roman Catholic Church of the Immaculate Conception on Malaya Gruzinskaya (Little Georgia Street), in what now the city's Central Administrative Okrug. According to his former parishioner Nora Rubashova, the Roman Catholic priests assigned to the parish secretly allowed Father Sergei to use the side altar dedicated to Our Lady of Ostrabrama, where he offered the Byzantine Rite Divine Liturgy in the Old Church Slavonic liturgical language.

Rubashova later recalled, "Father Sergey said [Divine Liturgy] each day at this altar, and on the eve of major feasts he observed the All Night Vigil. Rarely would one ever see so beautiful a Liturgy. The Church was large, tall, and unheated. Father Sergey's lips became bloodied from touching them every day to the freezing cold metal of the chalice."

In 1926 after the arrest of the Exarch Leonid Feodorov, Father Sergei Solovyov was appointed apostolic administrator of Moscow by Catholic underground bishop Piè Neveu and Vice Exarch for Catholic Synod of the Byzantine rite. In 1928 visited Saratov, where he stayed in secret in the local Catholic church.

His converts include a young Orthodox Jewish woman named Mina Kugel, who travelled from Kostroma to Moscow with the intention of converting and stayed with her relatives. She was secretly baptized in Moscow into the Russian Greek Catholic Church, with Nora Rubashova as her godmother, by the former Symbolist poet Fr. Sergei Solovyov. Mina Kugel chose the Christian name of Theresa, in honor of St. Thérèse of Lisieux.

== Arrest and detention ==
Following the Great Turn, a government crackdown on religious practice made life in the parish ever more difficult. Nora Rubashova later recalled, "When [the Liturgy] in Slavonic was no longer permitted in the Church, Father Sergei continued to say [the Liturgy] in his friend's apartments. He also gave papers in their apartments; I remember his works on Sts Sergius of Radonezh, Serafim of Sarov, the unification of the Churches, and other theological themes. He has an excellent command of language, both in conversation and in scholarly works; his thinking was always original and deep, his speech was artistically gifted."

In the night from 15 to 16 February 1931, Sergei Solovyov was arrested along with the underground community of Greek-Catholic Dominican nuns founded by Anna Abrikosova, many of whom were Jewish women whom Fr Sergei had converted to Byzantine Catholicism. Many of them later died in custody, the first of the victims was Victoria Burvasser. On August 18 by order of the Board of the OGPU Solovyov was sentenced to 10 years in labor camp replacement with deportation to Kazakhstan. During the investigation, he became mentally ill, and in October for health reasons he was exempted from punishment and placed in a psychiatric hospital. On November 21, 1932 Solovyov was released but more later he will again be admitted to the hospital. In 1941 Solovyov escaped from Moscow Psychiatric Hospital and fled to Kazan, where he died on March 2, 1942. He was buried at Arskoe cemetery, but the location of his grave is not preserved.

== Works ==
=== During his lifetime ===
- Flowers and incense (1907)
- Grurifragium (1908)
- April (1910)
- Princess flower garden (1913)
- Italy (1914)
- Returning to his father's house (1916)
- Selected Poems (1916)
- Theological, and critical essays. Collection of articles and public lectures (1916)
- Goethe and Christianity (1917)
- Unconscious and conscious intelligence absurdity (1922)
- Diary of exile (1922)

=== Posthumously published writings ===
- Irina Osipova (1999), Возлюбив Бога и следуя за Ним...". Гонения на русских католиков. По воспоминаниям и письмам монахинь-доминиканок Абрикосовской общины и материалы следственных дел 1923-1949 гг. , Moscow. (Contains previously unpublished later poetry by Sergei Solovyov, that were preserved by being memorized by the surviving nuns of the Abrikosova sisters community. Translated into English with the author's permission by Geraldine Kelley and self-published in 2014).
- Vladimir Solovyov: His Life and Creative Evolution, (Completed 1923. Published for the first time at Brussels in 1977, and in Moscow in 1997. English translations have been published by Eastern Christian Publications, Fairfax, Virginia, and Angelico Press, Brooklyn, New York)

== Notes ==
AV Lavrov "Successor kind" - Sergey Solovyov / / Soloviev SM memories . - M. : New Literary Review, 2003.

N. Solovyov "Father willed by" / / "Our Heritage" . - 1993. - № № 27.

Gaidenko P. "Temptation" holy flesh "(Sergey Solovyov and Russian Silver Age)" / / Questions of literature . - July–August 1996. - S. 72-127.

Skripkina VA Sergey Solovyov: spiritual quest. The evolution of creativity . - M. : MGOU, 2004.
