= Mustafa-Kadi Ismailov =

Dagestani religious leader

- Мустафа-Кади Исмаилов
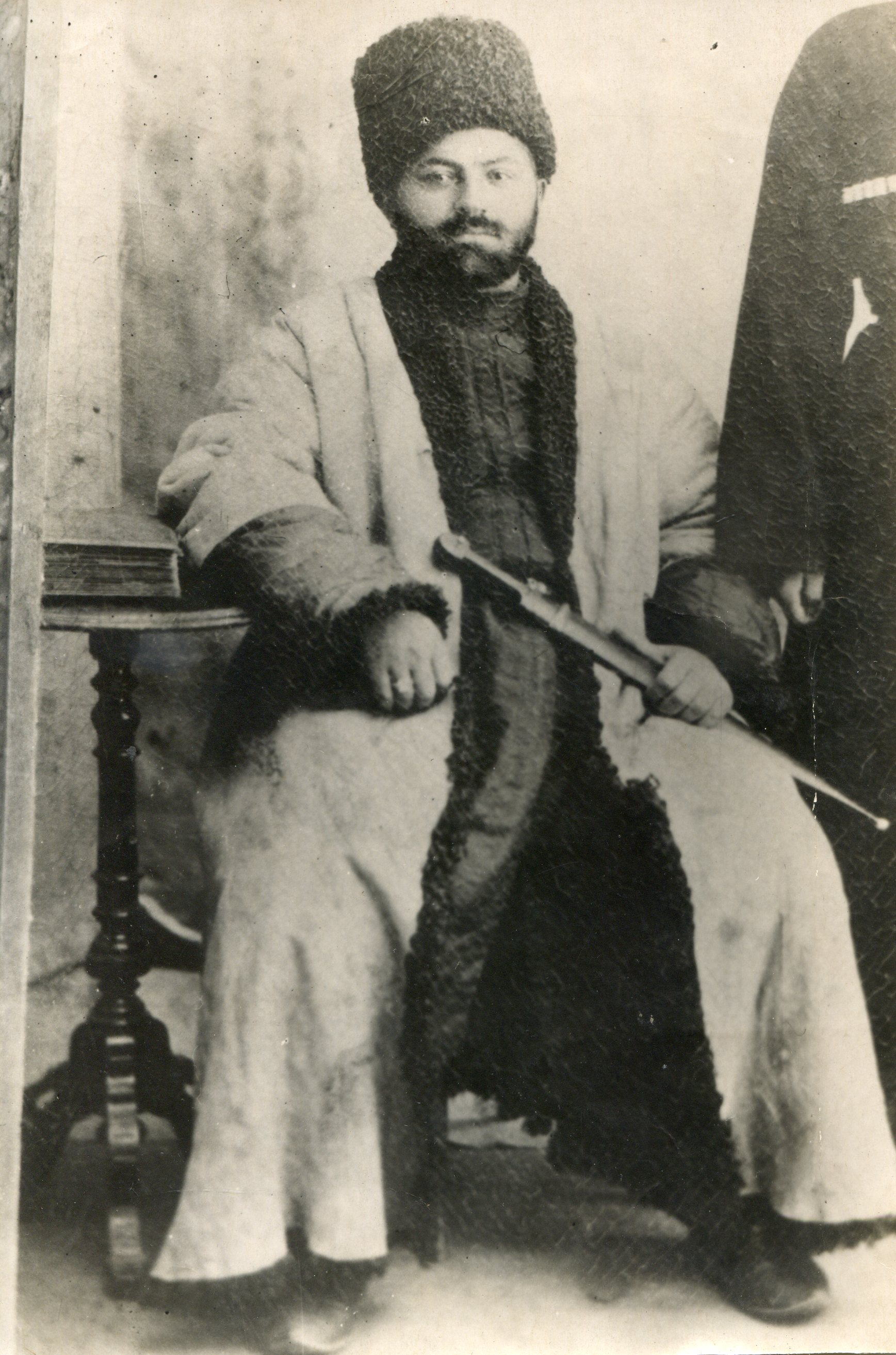
- Born: Mustafa Ismailovich Ismailov; 1879; Nizhneye Kazanishche, Temir-Khan-Shurinskiy okrug, Dagestan Oblast, Russian Empire
- Died: 1929 (aged 49–50); Kotlas, North Dvina Okrug, Northern Krai, Russian SFSR, Soviet Union
- Occupations: Qadi; arabist

Qadi Mustafa Ismailovich Ismailov (Russian: Мустафа-Кади Исмаилович Исмаилов; 1879 – December 1929) was a Russian and Soviet religious and public figure and Arabist during the February Revolution, the Russian Civil War, and the Soviet-era of Dagestan. He is said to have been among the people to revitalise Islam in modern-day Dagestan.

== Early life and education ==
Ismailov was born in Nizhneye Kazanishche in 1879 to the family of the respected Ismail. During his early years, he led was interested in the Quran.

He has higher theological Muslim education and was a notable Arabist and Qadi.

== Career ==
Ismailov began his career before the February Revolution. He was notable among locals as a vocal opponent to the Russian Empire and samoderzhaviye. He was one of the protesters after an attempt to russify his village faced backlash.

In April 1917, Ismailov, who supported the February Revolution, co-created the Jamiat-ul Islamia in Buynaksk. The group's notable slogan called for sharia, hurriya (freedom), adalat (fairness), and musawat (equality).

With the active participation of Ismailov, the religious public organization, the National Committee, was created in September 1917 in Buynaksk. It was led by Daniyal Apashev. As the Committee holds a referendum in different auls, the population reportedly supports the upkeeping of sharia law.

During the Russian Civil War, he urged the population to fight against the Bolsheviks, being quoted as saying "Whoever dies in this battle, will go to Heaven". Influenced by his agitation, many residents of Kazanishche participated in the offensive on Port-Petrovsk and Baku.

In 1920, he founded the religious society "Jamiatul-Khairiya" in Kazanishche. It was created as a counterweight to the Soviet village council, resulting in a dual power structure. All activities in the village were conducted under the leadership of this religious society. The village council was practically inactive, and the people reportedly disobeyed it. At Ismailov's initiative, a madrasa was built in Kazanishche in 1924 to train clergy. Many of the graduates found employment as mosque imams and qadis in many villages of Dagestan, primarily in the plains.

On 14 December 1929, the OGPU sentenced Mustafa-Kadi Ismailov to 10 years of imprisonment in the Kotlas concentration camp, where he died.
