= Nizhneye Kazanishche =

Nizhneye Kazanishche Нижнее Казанище Тёбен Къазаныш
- Selo
- Location within Republic of Dagestan Location within Russia
- Coordinates: 42°45′N 47°09′E
- Country: Russia
- Region: Republic of Dagestan
- District: Buynaksky District
- Time zone: UTC+3:00

Nizhneye Kazanishche (Russian: Нижнее Казанище; Kumyk: Тёбен Къазаныш, Töben Qazanış) is a rural locality (a selo) in Buynaksky District, Republic of Dagestan, Russia. The population was 12,871 as of 2010. There are 162 streets.

== Geography ==
Nizhneye Kazanishche is located 9 km southeast of Buynaksk (the district's administrative centre) by road, on the Buraganozen River. Buglen and Atlanaul are the nearest rural localities.

== Notable residents ==
- Tatu Bulach, Avar revolutionary and Soviet politician
- Mustafa-Kadi Ismailov, religious and public figure
