= Battle of Maloyaroslavets =

1812 battle of the French invasion of Russia

- Part of the French invasion of Russia
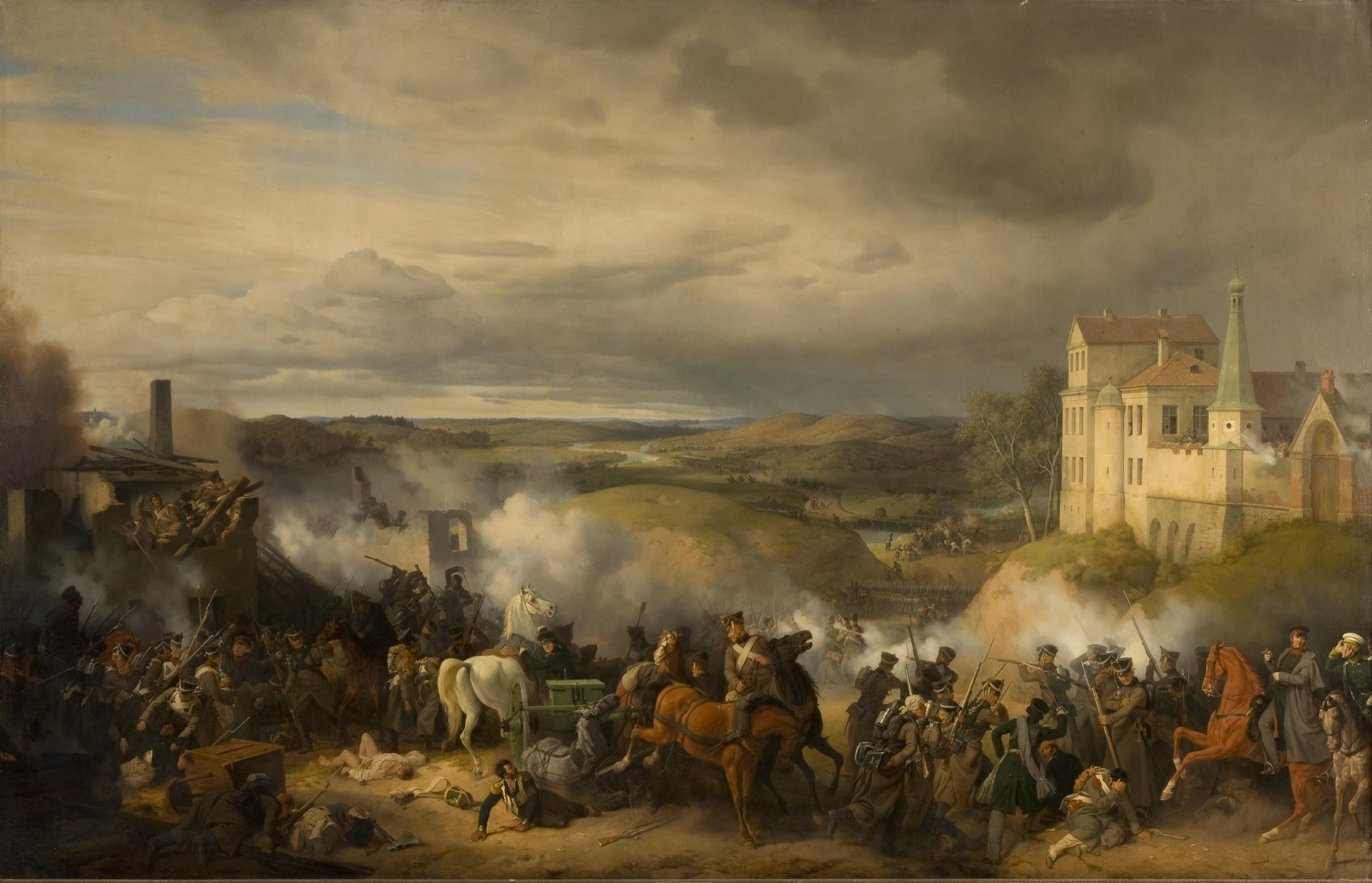
- Battle of Maloyaroslavets; Peter von Hess
Date	24 October 1812
Location	Maloyaroslavets, north of Kaluga Governorate, Russian Empire 55°01′18″N 36°27′30″E
Result	See § Aftermath

Belligerents
(First French Empire) French Empire (Kingdom of Italy (Napoleonic)) Kingdom of Italy	Russian Empire

Commanders and leaders
(First French Empire) Napoleon Bonaparte (First French Empire) Louis-Nicolas Davout (First French Empire) Alexis J. Delzons † (First French Empire) Armand C. Guilleminot (First French Empire) Jean-Baptiste Broussier (First French Empire) (Duchy of Warsaw) Jan Kozietulski (WIA) (Kingdom of Italy (Napoleonic)) Eugène de Beauharnais (Kingdom of Italy (Napoleonic)) Domenico Pino	(Russian Empire) Mikhail Kutuzov (Russian Empire) Dmitry Dokhturov (Russian Empire) Alexey Yermolov (Russian Empire) Nikolay Raevsky (Russian Empire) Mikhail Miloradovich (Russian Empire) Ivan Dorokhov^{[ru]} (Russian Empire) Mikhail Borozdin^{[ru]} (Russian Empire) Ivan Shakhovskoy^{[ru]}

Strength
24,000	24,000

Casualties and losses
6,000–8,000 killed and wounded	8,000 killed and wounded
- Location within Europe

French invasion of Russia
current battle
Prussian corps
Napoleon
Austrian corps

The Battle of Maloyaroslavets took place on 24 October 1812 (Note: Old Style date: 12 October 1812) as part of the French invasion of Russia. Armies were evenly matched in the battle and suffered similar casualties, with a marginal edge going to the Franco-Italian army. It was Mikhail Kutuzov's decisive battle to force Napoleon to retreat northwest over Mozhaisk to Smolensk on the devastated route of his advance with a higher probability of starvation. Kutuzov's next attack against the remnants of the Grande Armée, the Battle of Krasnoi, began on 15 November 1812, three weeks later.

== Prelude ==
The last major battle had been the Battle of Tarutino on 18 October 1812, that was won by the Russian army. A great part of the large mob of non-combatants, invalids from the hospitals, women, fugitive inhabitants of Moscow, whose number can only be guessed at, was directed upon Vereya and the straight road to Smolensk and only the fighting force was to march towards Kaluga. On 19 October 1812, Napoleon had retreated from Moscow and marched south-west to Kaluga, Eugène de Beauharnais leading the advance. The French army leaving Moscow was estimated by Wilson: 90,000 effective infantry, 14,000 feeble cavalry, 12,000 armed men employed in the various services of artillery, engineers, gendarmerie, head-quarter staff, equipages, and commissariat, and more than 20,000 non-combatants, sick, and wounded. General Dorokhov's partisan detachment was the first to discover Napoleon's movement towards Maloyaroslavets and reported it to Kutuzov in time. General Miloradovich's vanguard earnestly reported to Kutuzov that Napoleon had transferred his main advance from the old Kaluga road to the new one.

General Delzons commanded the lead units going to the town of Maloyaroslavets. The bridge and dam across Luzha River were destroyed by order of local authorities (mayor of Maloyaroslavets P. I. Bykovsky and official S. I. Belyayev). Bykovsky destroyed the permanent bridge, and an attempt to build a pontoon bridge failed due to the intervention of Bykovsky's associate, Belyayev, who destroyed the dam in the evening of the 23rd, and the water washed away the unfinished bridge. Before Belyayev destroyed the dam, Delzons managed to place only two of his battalions in the town. The rest of Delzons' soldiers crossed the river and began to enter the city only in the morning on the 24th by building a pontoon bridge next to the destroyed one. Then Delzons' division attacked the heights on which the town rested.

== Battle ==
On 24 October 1812 Kutuzov's sent General Dokhturov entered the town from the south and found the French spearhead had seized a bridgehead. Fierce fighting began. The chief of staff of Kutuzov's army, General Yermolov, was with Dokhturov. In the heat of the battle, overall control of Russian troops inside the town was entrusted to Yermolov. Dokhturov meanwhile personally led the attacks on the city and brought in reinforcements from his corps. Kutuzov was informed of the need to speed up the movement of his army. General Raevsky arrived with 10,000 more Russians; once more they took the town, though not the bridgehead. Beauharnais, on the other hand, threw in his 15th (Italian) division, under Domenico Pino (Minister of War of the Kingdom of Italy), and General Broussier's division; thus by evening they had again expelled the Russians. Armand Charles Guilleminot was the first who entered the city. Delzons was killed trying to rally the shaken soldiers by personal example, and Guilleminot, chief of staff of Beauharnais' corps, took his place. During the course of the engagement the town changed hands no fewer than eight times and it was quoted that in particular the Italian Royal Guard under Eugène de Beauharnais 'had displayed qualities which entitled it evermore to take rank amongst the bravest troops of Europe'. Pino's division had never been in action during the campaign before. Napoleon had been in tactical control of the battle since midday. He reinforced the exhausted Beauharnais with units of Marshal Davout. When Marshal Kutuzov himself arrived in the evening, he replaced Dokhturov's depleted corps with General Borozdin's corps (Note: Soon it was necessary to send grenadier regiments of Ivan Shakhovskoy^{[ru]} to support Borozdin.) and decided against a pitched battle with the Grand Army the next day, and to retire instead to the prepared line of defense at Kaluga.

The mainly French and Italian forces won a tactical victory on the day, but Napoleon might have realized that "unless with a new Borodino" the way through Kaluga and Medyn was closed. This allowed Kutuzov to fulfill his strategic plans to force Napoleon on the way of retreat in the north, through Mozhaisk and Smolensk, the route of his advance that he had wished to avoid. French casualties were about 6,000–8,000, while the Russians lost about 8,000 men killed and wounded.

== Kutuzov's strategy ==
On 25 October 1812 at about two in the morning after the battle Kutuzov retired his army in perfect order southwards away from the French army behind the rivulet of Korizha to secure the road to Kaluga. Robert Wilson, a British general attached to the Russian army, favoured an aggressive strategy against Napoleon and protested against Kutuzov's strategy. According to Wilson's memoirs, Kutuzov replied by stating "I am by no means sure that the total destruction of the Emperor Napoleon and his army would be such a benefit to the world; his succession would not fall to Russia or any other continental power, but to that which already commands the sea (i.e. Britain), and whose domination would then be intolerable."

== Aftermath ==
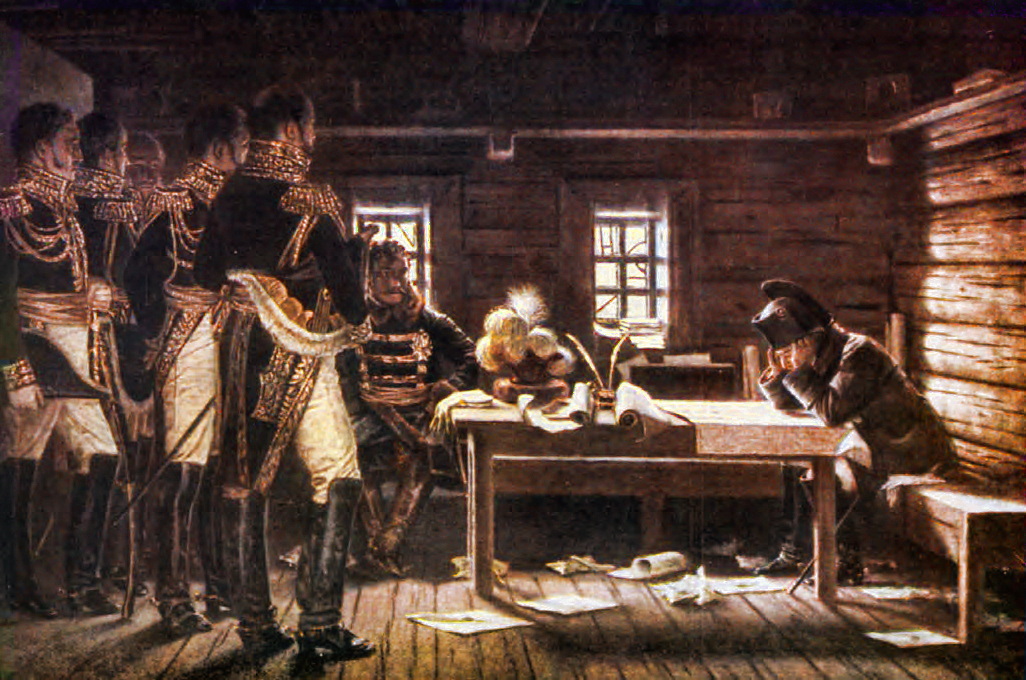
Napoleon and his marshals in trouble

The immediate result of the battle of Maloyaroslavets on the 24th had been a strange French tactical victory: the French army had secured a bridgehead, and instead of another attempt to hold on to the city (another "Borodino"), Kutuzov took up prepared defensive positions southwards; the Russian army had retreated but Napoleon did not follow them. The long-term result of the battle became a Russian strategic victory as they had disturbed Napoleon's ability to wage a war.

On the 25th, at daybreak, Napoleon nearly was caught by a Cossack regiment but was saved by a corps of grenadiers. From then on, Napoleon carried a bag containing a lethal poison, hung by a string around his neck.

On the 26th, Napoleon decided to retreat over Mozhaisk and Borodino to Smolensk for reasons unknown resulting in the strange detour in the attached map of Napoleon's invasion of Russia at Maloyaroslavets.

On the 26th Napoleon again set out for Maloyaroslavets,...he ordered the retreat of his own army by Mozhaisk on Smolensk. Before Napoleon could come to such a conclusion he must have been very conscious of the extreme weakness of his army, for the march he now decided on undertaking was one of two hundred and sixty miles through a devastated country, whose towns, sacked and burnt, offered no shelter or supply against the inclemency of winter.

The rearguards of Davout and Miloradovich stood in sight of each other until the night of 26–27 October and exchanged several cannon shots during this time. On the same night, the rear guard of the Grand Army left the ruins of the city, crossed to the northern bank of the Luzha and joined the general retreat.

On Kutuzov's order, Platov and his Cossacks directly followed Napoleon. The next major battle for the Russian army was the Battle of Vyazma on 3 November 1812.

Kutuzov "escorted" Napoleon off the more southern roads with better supply of food and shelter, securing the south against the French army. The next battle for Kutuzov was the Battle of Krasnoi on 15 November 1812.

The last battle in this campaign for Napoleon was the Battle of Berezina on 26–29 November 1812.

== Gallery ==
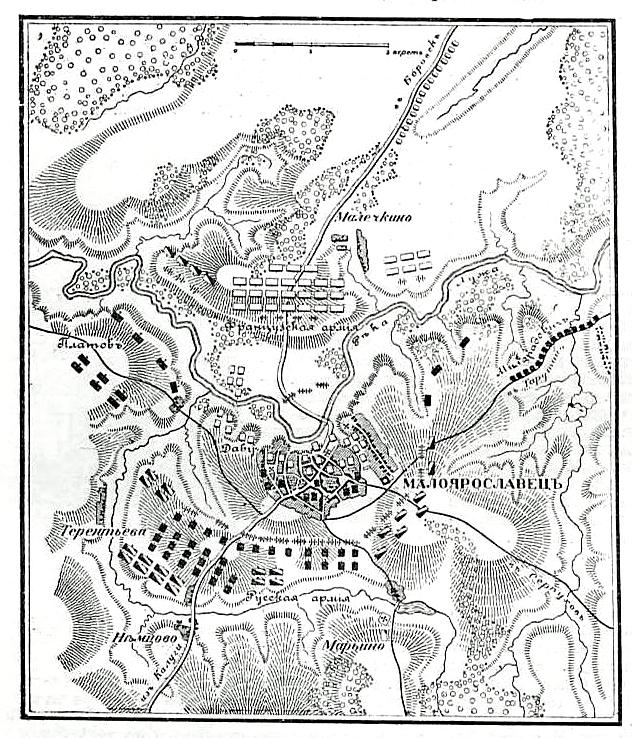
Battle map

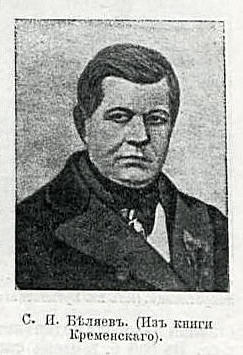
Official Belyayev, thanks to whom Napoleon's movement on the eve of battle was delayed.

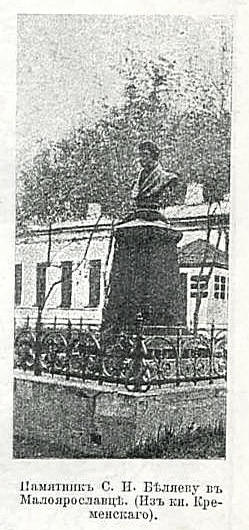
A monument to him in Maloyaroslavets

== See also ==
- List of battles of the French invasion of Russia

== Sources ==
- Bourgogne, Adrien Jean Baptiste François, Memoirs of Sergeant Bourgogne, 1812–1813
- Chambray, George de, Histoire de l'expédition de Russie
- Weider, Ben and Franceschi, The Wars Against Napoleon: Debunking the Myth of the Napoleonic Wars, 2007
- Zamoyski, Adam, Moscow 1812, Napoleon's Fatal March, 1980
- Brumfield, William Craft, Maloyaroslavets: Where Napoleon's fate was sealed, 2016

Preceded by Battle of Venta del Pozo	Napoleonic Wars; Battle of Maloyaroslavets	Succeeded by Battle of Chashniki
