= Protva =

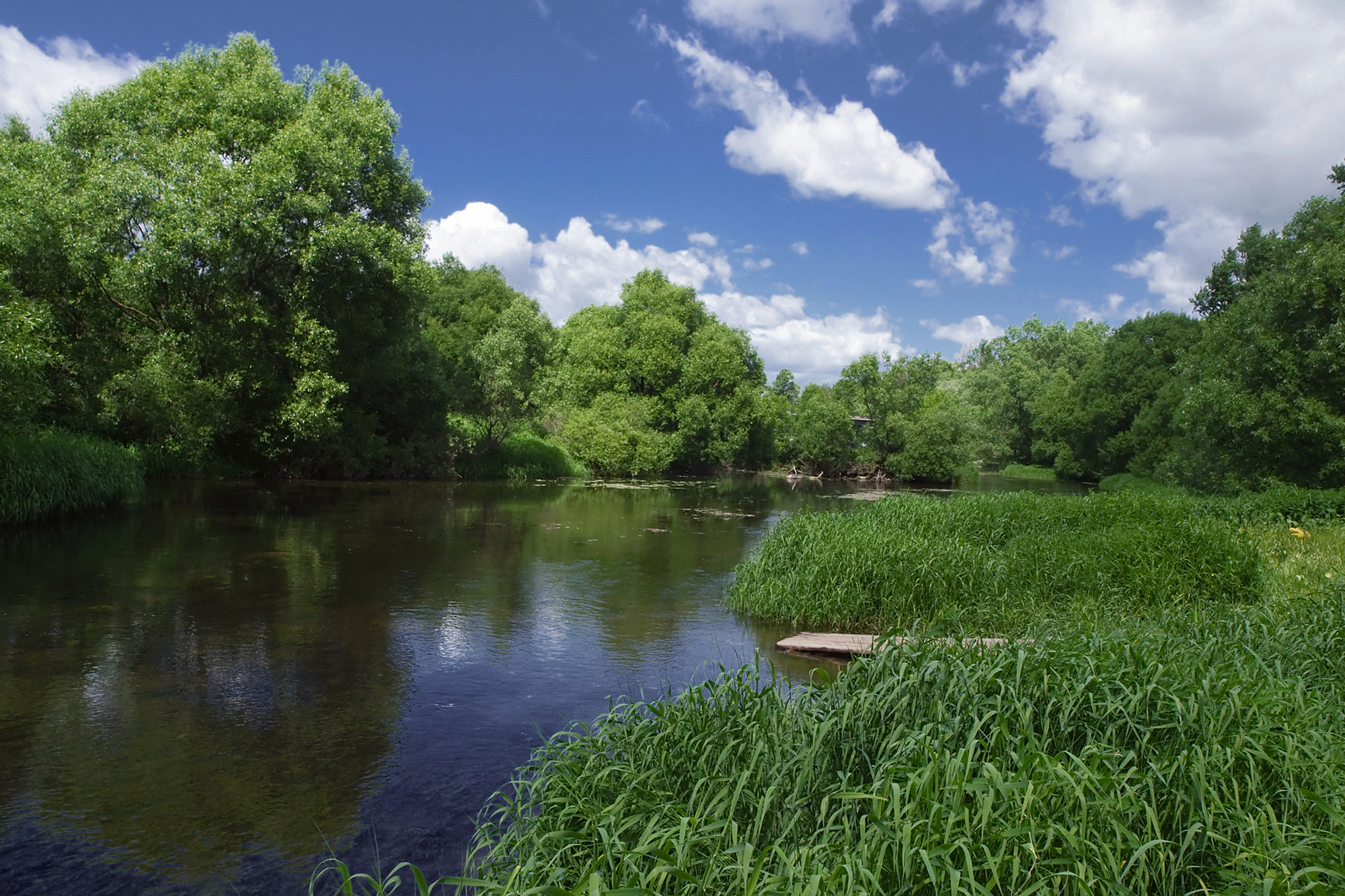
- Protva River in Borovsk
- Native name: Протва (Russian)

Location
- Country: Russia

Physical characteristics
- Mouth: Oka
  - coordinates: 54°51′36″N 37°09′45″E
- Length: 282 km (175 mi)
- Basin size: 4,620 km^{2} (1,780 sq mi)

Basin features
- Progression: Oka→ Volga→ Caspian Sea
- Tributaries
  - right: Luzha

The Protva (Russian: Протва) is a river in the Moscow and Kaluga oblasts in Russia. It is a left tributary of the Oka. It is 282 kilometres (175 mi) long, and has a drainage basin of 4,620 square kilometres (1,780 sq mi). The area of its basin is 4,620 square kilometres (1,780 sq mi). The Protva freezes up in early December and stays icebound until early April. Its main tributary is the Luzha. The towns of Vereya, Borovsk, Protvino and Obninsk are located on the shores of the Protva.
