= Pierre-Marie Taillepied, Comte de Bondy =

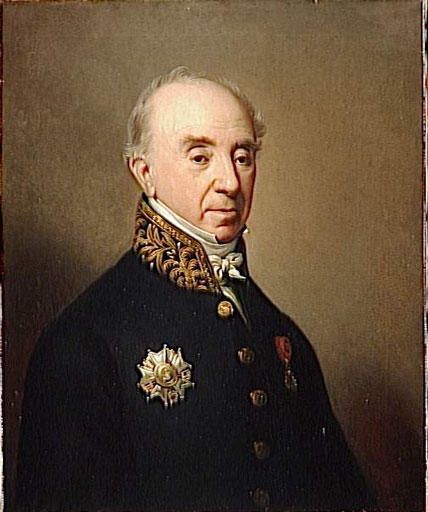
Pierre-Marie Taillepied, comte de Bondy, by Franz Xaver Winterhalter (1805–1873), oil on canvas, 1847, Museum of the History of France (Versailles).

Pierre-Marie Taillepied, Comte de Bondy (7 October 1766 – 11 January 1847) was a French politician who was born in Paris on 7 October 1766 and died in the same city on 11 January 1847.

He sat in the French National Assembly or the House of Representatives in four occasions:

- 13 May 1815 – 13 July 1815
- 4 October 1816 – 24 December 1823
- 17 November 1827 – 16 May 1830
- 13 June 1830 – 28 July 1830
