= Stephanie Gorodets =

Sister Stephanie Gorodets (1893, in Kiev, Russian Empire or in Moscow by other sources – 25 May 1974, in Moscow, USSR) was a Russian Greek Catholic nun.

== Biography ==
She was born in 1893 in Kiev with the name Vera Gorodets into an ethnically mixed family, her father being a Jewish convert to Christianity and her mother was Russian Orthodox by birth. She lived in Moscow and gave private lessons. On 10 March 1924 she was arrested and placed in Butyrskaya prison. After the adoption of Catholicism around 1921, Gorodets came into Abrikosov community and was tonsured a Dominican nun named Sister Stephanie. While in exile Gorodets lived in a village near Tobolsk and was released on 9 May 1927 with the prohibition of residence in 6 major cities and border areas. She lived in Romny on Ukraine, in 1928, moved to Kostroma in 1930 to Odessa, in 1932 to Krasnodar, in 1933 to Stavropol where in the same year was again arrested, but released for "lack of evidence". Since 1934, she lived in Tambov where in January 1935 was arrested on group case of the Catholic clergy. On November 16, 1935 Gorodets was acquitted and on November 27 released from prison. She moved to Maloyaroslavets. In September 1942, after the liberation of the city from the Germans, she was arrested and sentenced to five years' exile and sent to New Shulba Semipalatinsk Oblast and was released in September 1947. After his release, she returned to Maloyaroslavetz and in the summer of 1948 moved to Kaluga, where she was arrested again on November 30, 1948 and was accused of spying for the Vatican. On August 17 of the next year, Gorodets was sentenced to 10 years in labor camps. She was sent to Vorkuta Gulag in 1954 and moved to the nursing home in Ukhta, being released in 1956. Later she settled in Moscow. Stephanie Gorodets died on 25 May 1974. She was buried at the Khovanskoye Cemetery.
