= Luzha =

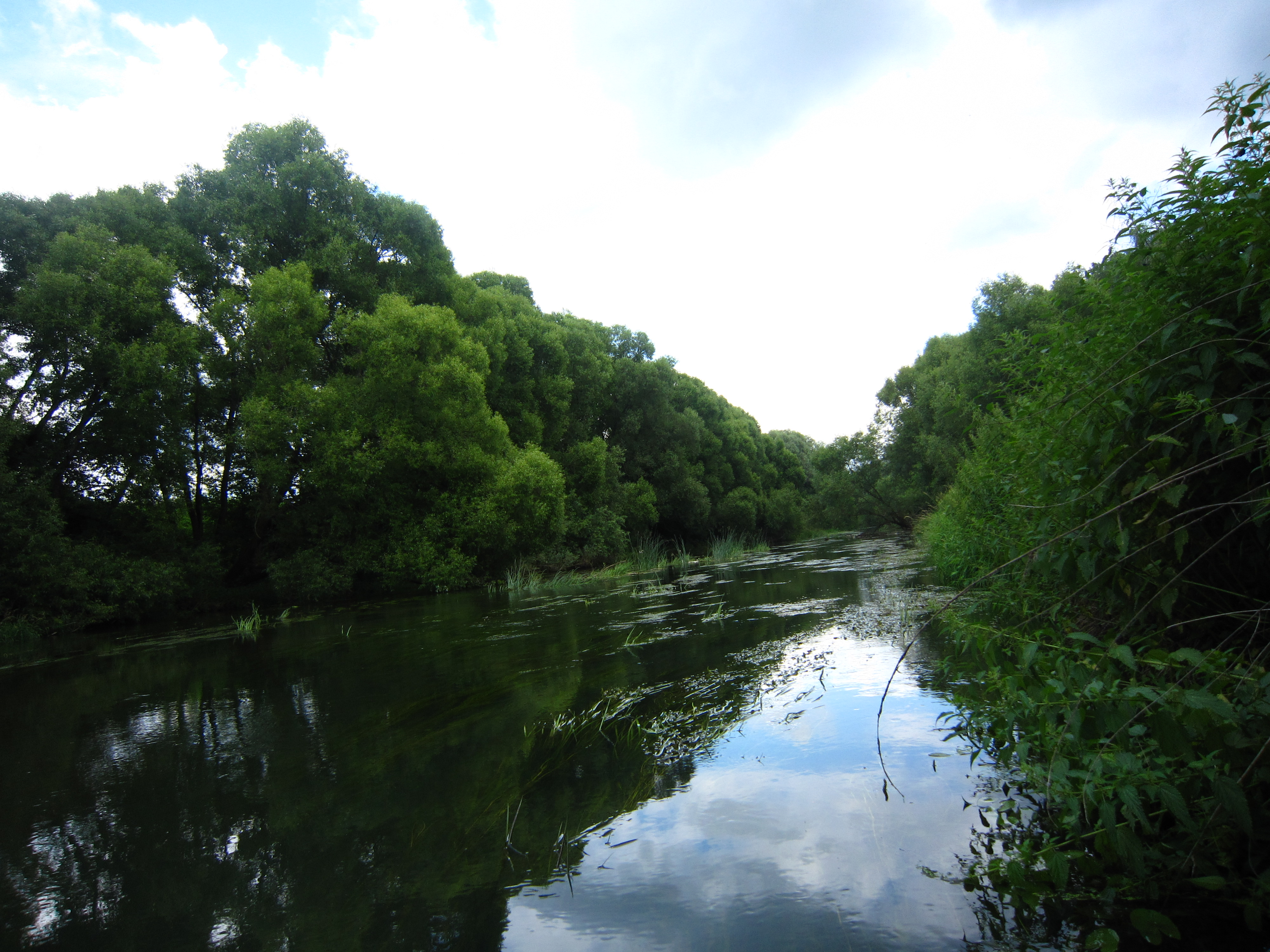
- Native name: Лужа (Russian)

Location
- Country: Russia

Physical characteristics
- Mouth: Protva
  - coordinates: 55°03′40″N 36°34′23″E
- Length: 159 km (99 mi)
- Basin size: 1,400 km^{2} (540 sq mi)

Basin features
- Progression: Protva→ Oka→ Volga→ Caspian Sea

The Luzha (Russian: Лужа) is a river in Kaluga Oblast, Russia, which originates in Moscow Oblast. It is a right tributary of the Protva (in the Oka river basin). The Luzha has a length of 159 km (99 mi) and a drainage basin area of 1,400 km^{2} (540 mi^{2}). The Luzha freezes up in November (rarely in December) and breaks up in April. The town of Maloyaroslavets, the site of an important battle in 1812 during the French invasion of Russia, is located on the Luzha.
