= Zhanalyk, Talgar District =

Coordinates: 43°34′56″N 77°03′38″E

Zhanalyk (Kazakh: Жаңалық) is a village in Kaynar rural district Talgar District, Almaty Region, Kazakhstan. According to the 2009 population census of Kazakhstan, the population was 1,378.

In 2018, the Museum of Memory of Victims of Political Repression was opened in Zhanalyk. This village, close to Almaty, is known to be the place of mass burial of people killed by the Almaty NKVD.
