= Maloyaroslavets =

Town in Kaluga Oblast, Russia

Maloyaroslavets Малоярославец
- Town
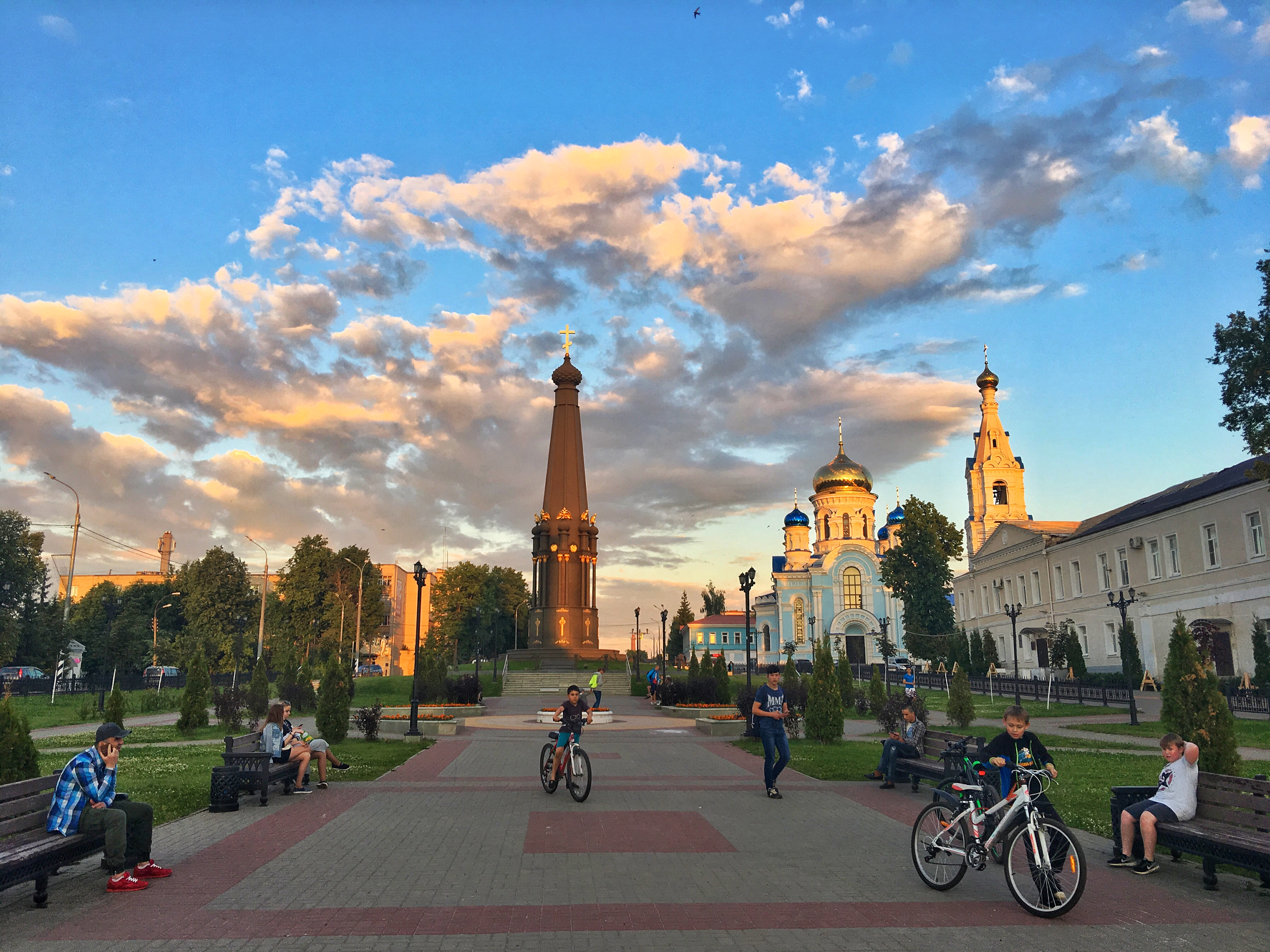
- A town square in Maloyaroslavets

- Flag Coat of arms
- Interactive map of Maloyaroslavets
- Location of Maloyaroslavets Maloyaroslavets (Kaluga Oblast)
- Coordinates: 55°01′N 36°28′E
- Country: Russia
- Federal subject: Kaluga Oblast
- Administrative district: Maloyaroslavetsky District
- Founded: late 14th century
- Elevation: 190 m (620 ft)

Population (2010 Census)
  - Total: 30,392
  - Estimate (2023): 41,511 (+36.6%)

Administrative status
  - Capital of: Maloyaroslavetsky District

Municipal status
  - Municipal district: Maloyaroslavetsky Municipal District
  - Urban settlement: Maloyaroslavets Urban Settlement
  - Capital of: Maloyaroslavetsky Municipal District, Maloyaroslavets Urban Settlement
- Time zone: UTC+3 (MSK)
- Postal codes: 249091–249094, 249096
- OKTMO ID: 29623101001
- Website: www.admmaloyaroslavec.ru

Maloyaroslavets (Russian: Малояросла́вец) is a town and the administrative center of Maloyaroslavetsky District in Kaluga Oblast, Russia, located on the right bank of the Luzha River (Oka's basin), 61 kilometers (38 mi) northeast of Kaluga, the administrative center of the oblast. Population: 41,836 (2021 census); 30,392 (2010 census); 31,606 (2002 census); 26,582 (1989 Soviet census). 21,200 (1970).

== History ==
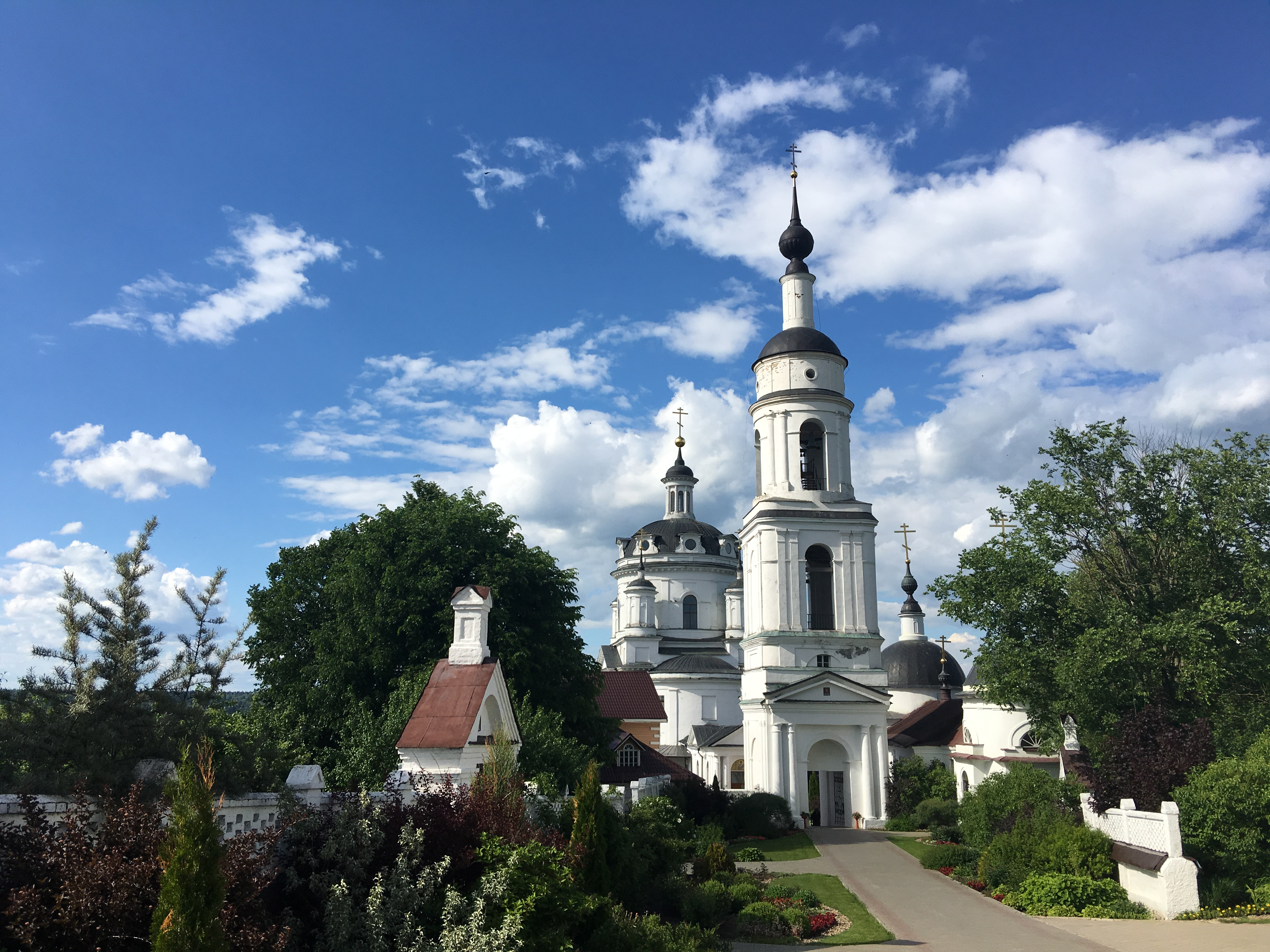
The Convent of Saint Nicholas, Maloyaroslavets, still serves as a monastery today.

It was founded in the late 14th century by Vladimir the Bold and named Yaroslavets after his son Yaroslav. In 1485, the town was annexed by the Grand Duchy of Moscow and renamed Maloyaroslavets to distinguish it from Yaroslavl. During the French invasion of Russia, the Battle of Maloyaroslavets took place near this town on October 12 (24) of 1812. The battle was commemorated by a roomy cathedral built at the Black Island (Chyornoostrovsky) Convent of Maloyaroslavets by 1843.

A number of fierce battles were also fought near Maloyaroslavets during the Battle of Moscow in 1941–1942. The town was under German occupation from 18 October 1941 until 2 January 1942. In late 1941, the Germans operated the Dulag 112 and Dulag 126 transit prisoner-of-war camps in the town. It was liberated by troops of the Western Front of the Red Army.

== Administrative and municipal status ==
Within the framework of administrative divisions, Maloyaroslavets serves as the administrative center of Maloyaroslavetsky District, to which it is directly subordinated. As a municipal division, the town of Maloyaroslavets is incorporated within Maloyaroslavetsky Municipal District as Maloyaroslavets Urban Settlement.

== Twin towns and sister cities ==
Maloyaroslavets is twinned with:

- Barysaw, Belarus
- Ischia, Italy
- Serpukhov, Russia
- Aleksin, Russia

== Gallery ==
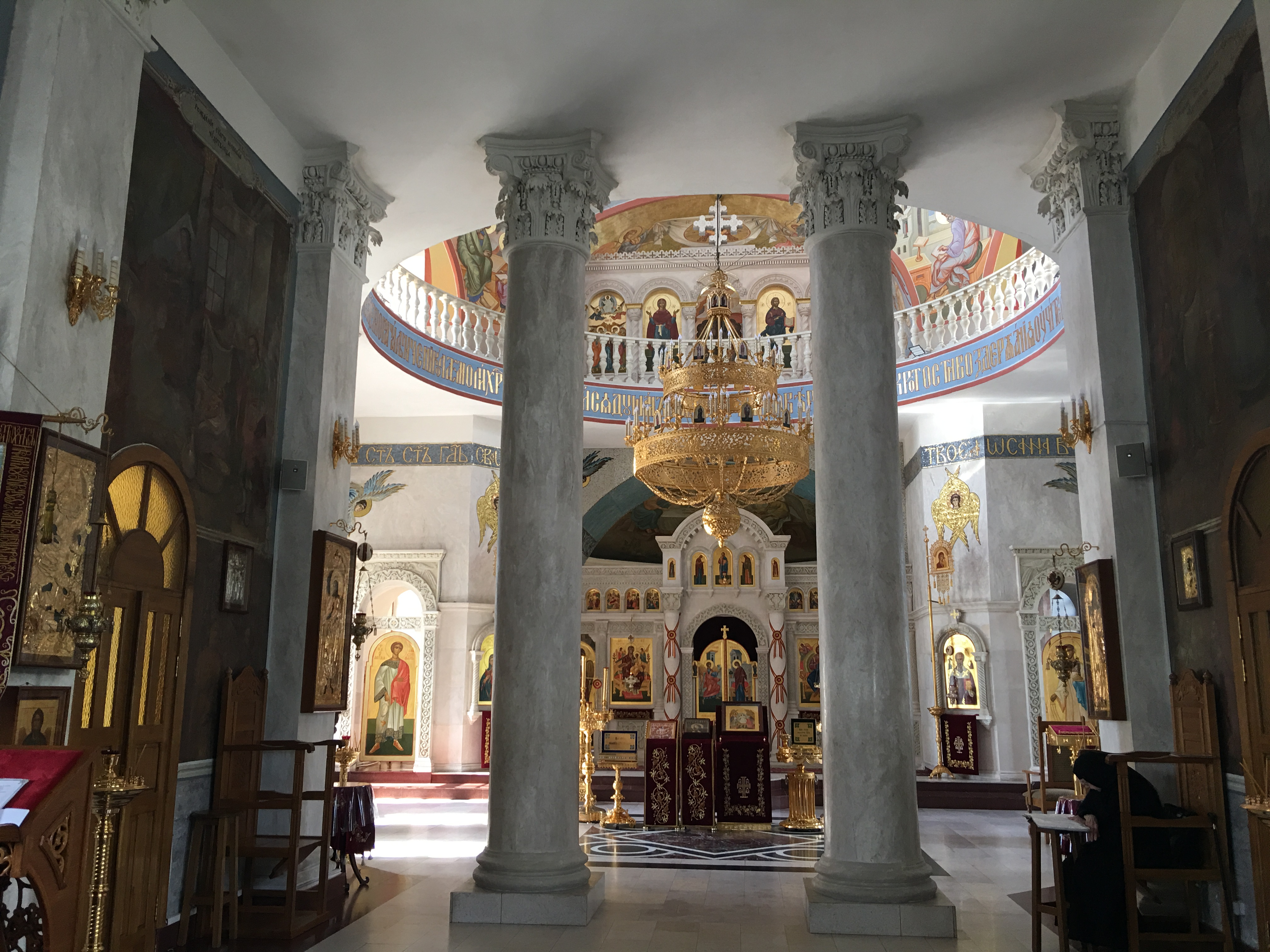
Inside the Cathedral in the Convent of Saint Nicholas

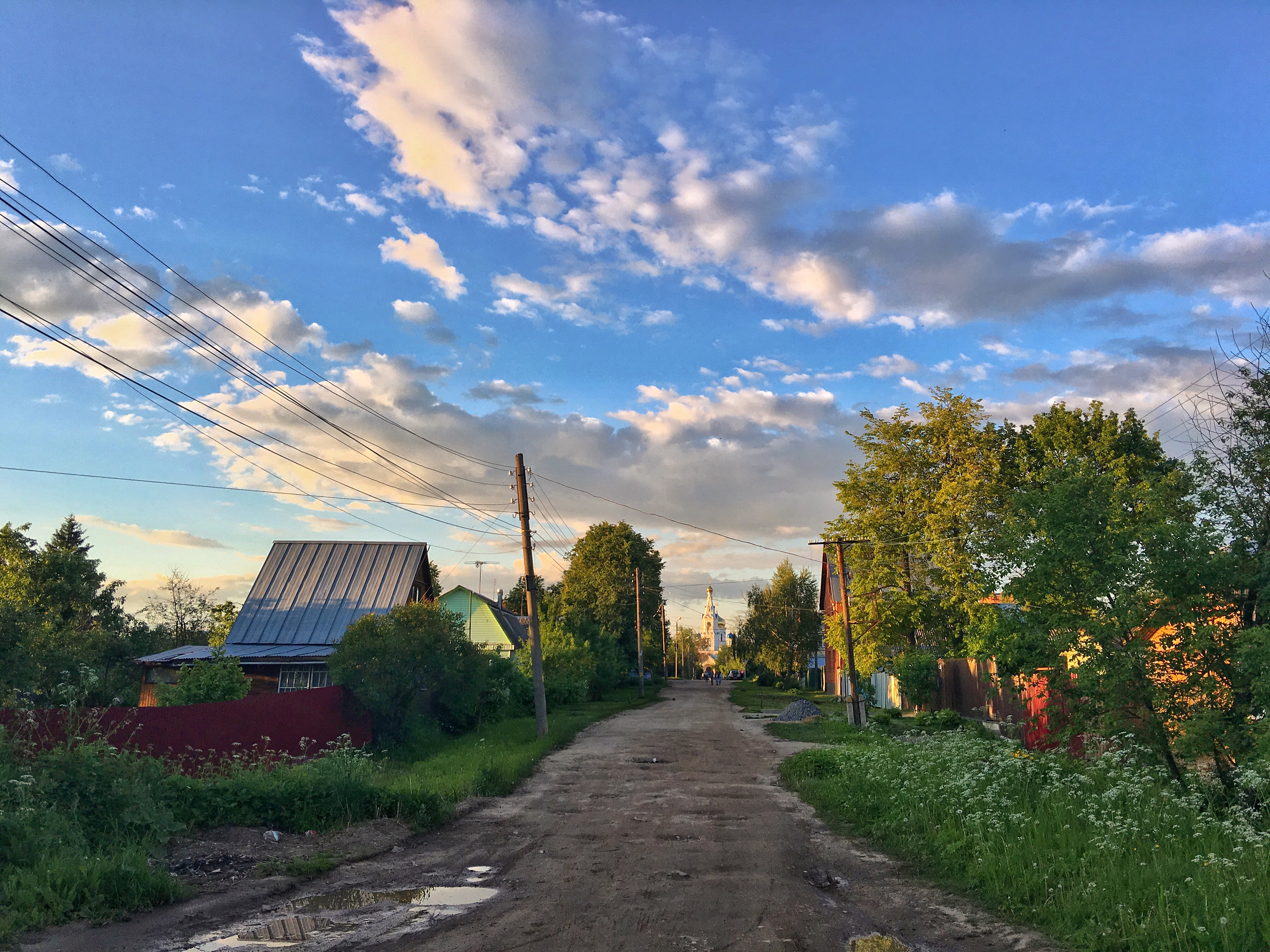
A neighborhood

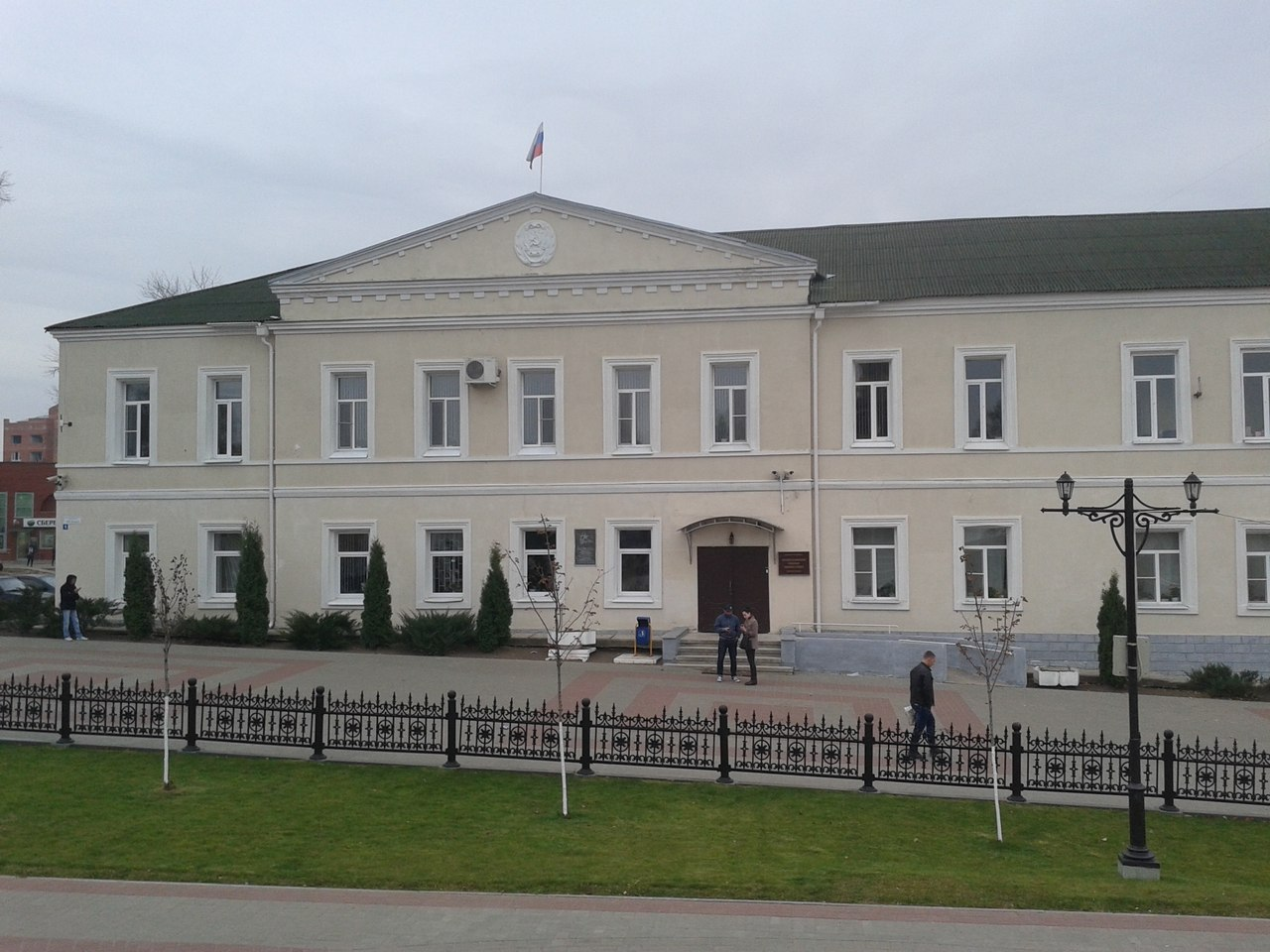
Administration building

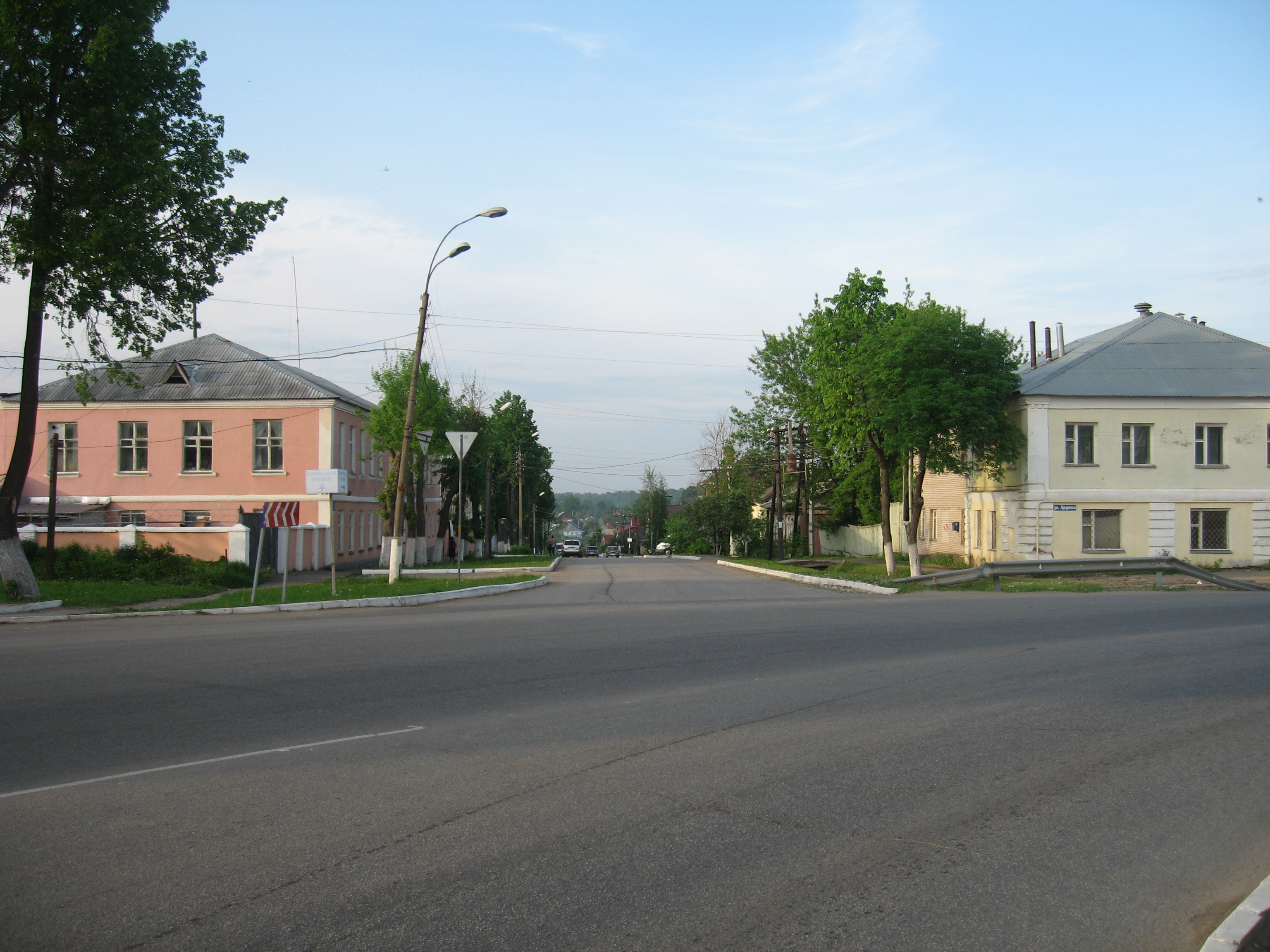
Street view

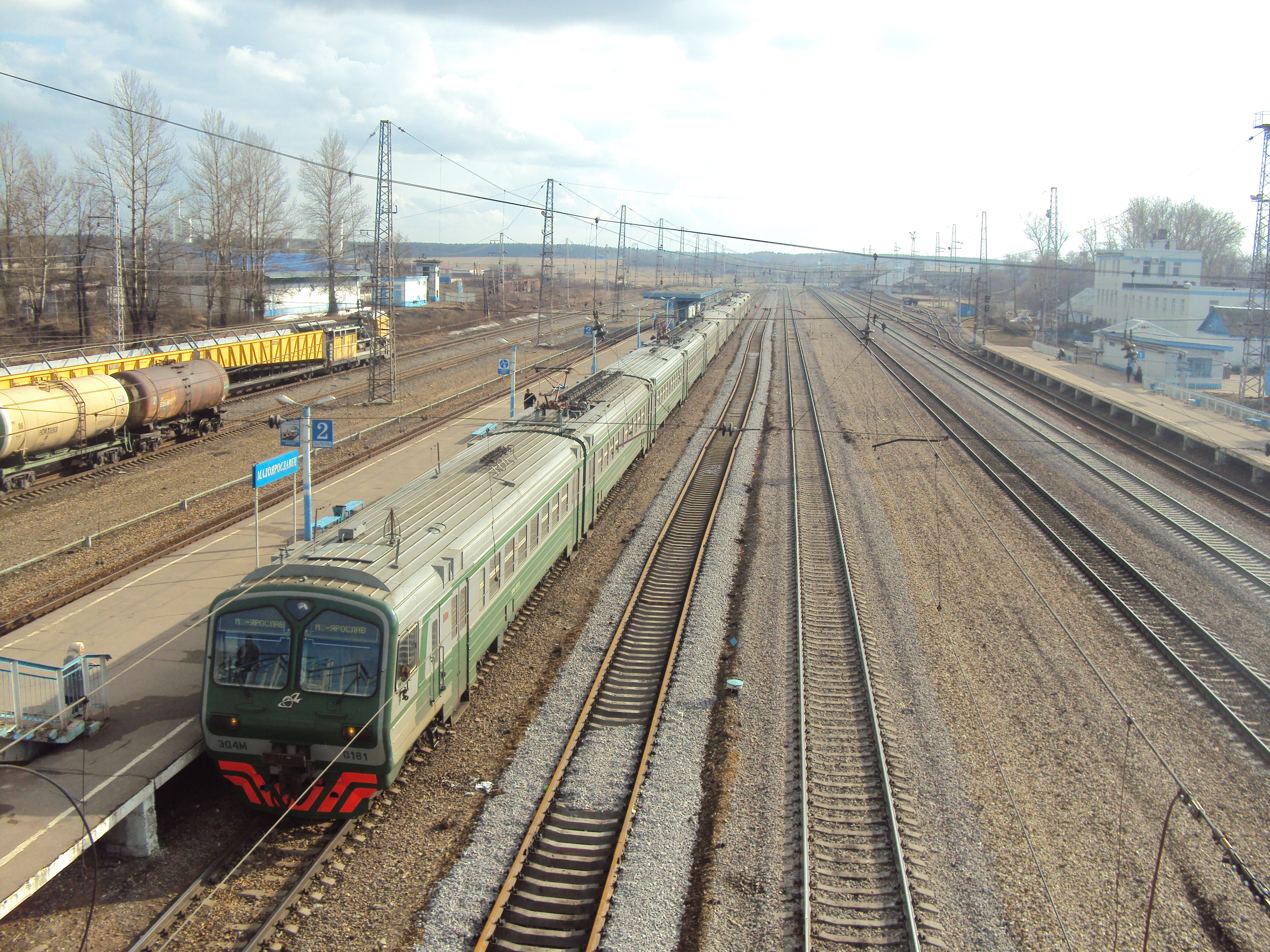
Railroad station
