= Vladimir Bibikhin =

Russian religious thinker (1938–2004)

- Born: 29 August 1938; Bezhetsk, RSFSR, USSR
- Died: 12 December 2004 (aged 66); Moscow, Russia

Philosophical work
- Era: 20th-century philosophy
- Region: Russian philosophy

Vladimir Veniaminovich Bibikhin (29 August 1938, Bezhetsk — 12 December 2004, Moscow) was the most prominent Soviet and Russian religious thinker of the New Russia and continued the Russian tradition of early 20th century religious thinking. He was known as a translator, philologist, and philosopher. He is best known for translations of Martin Heidegger, which caused mixed reactions among specialists. He lectured in authors' courses at the philosophy faculty of Moscow State University. Bibikhin undertook a sufficient number of translations to enable him to formulate his own theory of Europe. This theory consisted in part of a return to the past, and enlivening the most valuable achievements of the past culture.

== Biography ==
Bibikhin graduated from Moscow State Linguistic University in 1967 and taught language and translation theory at both the MSLU and MGIMO University. At this time, he worked mainly on philosophy and literature and studied ancient languages under Andrey Zaliznyak. He completed his postgraduate study at the faculty of philosophy, MSU in 1977 by defending his candidate's thesis, entitled: "Semantic Potencies of the Linguistic Sign." The themes included in his thesis were: 1) interrelations between word and world, 2) word and thought, 3) an approach to word and thought, 4) attempt to think of the ontological foundation of language. These theories were subsequently developed in a seminar called "Inner form of word" and in the courses "Language of Philosophy" and "L. Wittgenstein."

He worked as a secretary and assistant for Aleksei Losev, also recording several conversations with the philosopher. These recordings were later collected and published in the book "Aleksei Fedorovich Losev. Sergey Sergeyevich Averintsev." (2004)

Bibikhin was employed at the Institute of Philosophy, Russian Academy of Sciences in 1972 and served there until his death. He spent his last years working at the Centre of Methodology and Ethics of Science of the Philosophy of Science and Technology Branch of the Institute. He was a lecturer of Philosophy and member of the faculty of MSU from 1989 onward.

He lectured in authors courses and held seminars at the Faculty of Philosophy of MSU from 1980 to 2004. He also lectured at St. Philaret's Christian Institute in Moscow and St. Thomas Institute.

He was buried at Nikolo-Archangelski cemetery in Moscow.

== Philosopher and lecturer ==
Bibikhin lectured in about twenty courses at MSU and other institutes. He wrote: 'Philosophy always went against the stream. With great risk... Philosophy is for the returning from doctrines to things; for recalling the early; for the ending of divination through words. There is a difference between philosophy and the sciences: they are building themselves, philosophy is called to reconstruct itself like a scaffolding after building the house.'

Bibikhin believed philosophy was not an "intellectual activity," nor a "scientific sphere" or a "cultural sphere," and the philosophers' language is not a "construction," or "information about the things" – rather, it is a 'preparation for the possibility of forming knowledge about things based on the last, utmost foundations'. To Bibikhin, Philosophy is an 'attempt — guaranteed by nothing – to give my life, human life, back the way it used to be at the very beginning: relation to the world, not to the picture, but to an event'. It is an attempt to let an event be in disinterested word, let it be the 'place where an event is shining, becoming a phenomenon, where all that exists is let to be as it really is, not controlled or placed on a register'.

Heidegger's thought was essential to Bibikhin. In his four-term course "Early Heidegger" (1990s) Bibikhin read Heidegger's earliest works not as immature and preliminary, but as a commentary to his later writings. The course was mostly devoted, both in lecturers and seminars, to the reading and study of Heidegger's main work "Being and Time" (1927). Bibikhin's last seminars at the Institute of Philosophy and his last article were also dedicated to Heidegger.

== Translator ==
Vladimir Bibikhin translated texts from Spanish, Italian, Latin, Greek, French, English, and German from 1967 onward. He wrote several papers and scientific reviews, as well as commentaries on translations and articles on the theory of translation (the best of them were subsequently included in the book "Word and Event"). Among others, Bibikhin translated the works of Iamblichus, John Amos Comenius, García Lorca, Giuseppe Mazzini, Petrarch, Nicholas of Cusa, St. Gregory Palamas, St. Macarius of Egypt, W. Heisenberg, Jean-Paul Sartre, Gabriel Marcel, Jacques Ellul, Eugène Ionesco, Antonin Artaud, Wilhelm von Humboldt, Sigmund Freud, Ludwig Wittgenstein, Martin Heidegger, Gadamer, Wilhelm Dilthey, Hannah Arendt, and Jacques Derrida. Theological translations were published under the pseudonym V. Veneaminov.

== Criticism ==
Bibikhin's views on philosophy of language were controversial, and were criticized by some professional philosophers and linguists.

N. V. Motroshilova claimed Bibikhin had deliberately concealed Heidegger's closeness to the Nazis and ignored empirical evidence of his loyalty to the Nazi regime. She also noted the ambiguity of his "Being and Time" translation: 'But his translation of "Being and Time" is worthy of special conversation. This translation is quite interesting and valuable as an independent phenomenon, and as Bibikhin's work. But the point is that it is the first and the only 'presence' of "Time and Being" in Russian philosophic culture, in Russian language for now. And, unfortunately, (I've heard it from many teachers), the translation doesn't help but significantly hampers comprehension of that classic work of XX century. So I'd recommend the above-mentioned E. Borisov's translation to those just starting their mastery of Heidegger's philosophy – it is not "Being and Time", but Heidegger is there more intelligible and adequate'.

Critics also complained of a distortion to Heidegger's works in Bibikhin's translations. For example, Aleksandr Dugin writes: 'It appears that Bibikhin and like-minded persons are really carried away by Heidegger, but there is nothing but that zeal in presentation of Heidegger. It's totally insufferable to read them because these texts say too much about conditions, efforts and sufferings of Bibikhin and his colleagues-translators, but there is almost nothing except for accidental coincidences, they say nothing about Heidegger or give the picture making one's hair stand on end.'

Boris Narumov criticizes V. Bibikhin for a lack of methodology and disregard for linguistics as a science.

A. Apollonov claims deliberate distortions in Bibhikin's translations in order to support his judgments by the authority of an established philosopher, citing Bibhikin's translation of Aristotle as an example.

== Political views ==
V. Bibikhin was a supporter of Chechnya's sovereignty. According to the testimony of Konstantin Anatolyevich Krylov, a personal acquaintance of Bibikhin, during the Second Chechen War Bibikhin confronted officers of the Russian Armed Forces and asked them "not to wage war with free people."

In December 2003 V. Bibikhin took part in a public debate on the case of Yukos, standing on the side of Mikhail Khodorkovsky.

V. Bibikhin was an adherent to ideas of liberalism, multiculturalism, and toleration.

== Awards and prizes ==
Bibikhin won the Malyi Booker award for his book of essays "New Renaissance." He was a laureate of the literary prize "Book of the Year" in philosophic and humanitarian thought, for the book "Ludwig Wittgenstein: Change of Aspect". He was also awarded the A. Piatigorsky literature prize for the best philosophic work for his "Diaries of Leo Tolstoy" in 2003.

== Selective bibliography ==
=== Translations ===
- Nicholas of Cusa. On Learned Ignorance. On Conjectures (Part two). Small works of 1445–1447. Experiments with weights. About the vision of God. On the Beryl. The Ball Game. Compendium. Hunting for wisdom. On the Summit of Contemplation, Николай Кузанский. Об ученом незнании. О предположениях (Часть вторая). Малые произведения 1445—1447 гг. Простец об опытах с весами. О видении Бога. Берилл. Игра в шар. Компендий. Охота за мудростью. О вершине созерцания. (1979—1980).
- Heisenberg V. Part and whole. (Russian: Гейзенберг В. Часть и целое.) (1980).
- Petrarch The word, read by the famous poet (Cicero) ... A book of letters about everyday affairs. Invective against the doctor. Older letters.(Russian: Петрарка Ф. Слово, читанное знаменитым поэтом… Книга писем о делах повседневных. Инвектива против врача. Старческие письма.) (1982)
- Macarius of Egypt Spiritual Homilies (Russian: Макарий Египетский. Новые духовные беседы.) (1990).
- Martin Heidegger Time and Being (articles and speeches) (Russian: Хайдеггер М. Время и бытие (статьи и выступления)) (1993).
- Gregory Palamas Triads in defense of the sacred Св. (Russian: Григорий Палама. Триады в защиту священно-безмолвствующих.) (1995).
- Jacques Derrida Positions (Russian: Жак Деррида. Позиции.) (1996).
- Martin Heidegger Being and time. (Russian: Хайдеггер М. Бытие и время.) (1997).
- Hannah Arendt The Human Condition. (Russian: Арендт Х. VITA ACTIVA или О деятельной жизни.) (2000).

=== Monographs and edited collections ===
- The Language of Philosophy (1993): — М.: Progress, 1993. — 416 p. — ISBN 5-01-004199-5

2nd corrected ed.: The Languages of Slavic Culture, 2002. — 416 p. — ISBN 5-94457-042-3
3rd ed.: М.: Nauka, 2007. — 392 p. — Series «A Word about Substance» (Слово о сущем). — ISBN 5-02-026832-1
4th ed. (in the form of a collection): SPB.: Azbuka-Klassika, 2015. — 448 p. — ISBN 978-5-389-10597-3

- World (Мир) (1995): (Tomsk: Volodej, 1995. — 144 p. — ISBN 5-7137-0025-9);

2nd corrected ed.: М.: Nauka, 2007. — 434 p. — Series «A Word about Substance» (Слово о сущем). — ISBN 978-5-02-026282-9.
3rd ed. (in the form of a collection): SPB.: Azbuka-Klassika, 2015. — 448 p. — ISBN 978-5-389-10597-3.

- New Renaissance. — М.: Nauka, Progress-Traditsia, 1998. — 496 p. — ISBN 5-7846-0008-7.

2nd ed., corrected: Universitet Dm. Pozharskogo, 2013. — 424 p. — ISBN 978-5-91244-058-8.

- Know Thyself (Узнай себя). — SPB.: Nauka, 1998. — 578 p. — Series «A Word about Substance» (Слово о сущем). — ISBN 5-02-026791-0.

2nd ed., corrected and supplemented: SPB: Nauka, 2015. — 446 p. — Series «A Word about Substance» (Слово о сущем). — ISBN 978-5-02-038411-8.

- Word and Event. — М.: Editorial URSS, 2001. — 280 p. — ISBN 5-8360-0215-0.

2nd ed., corrected and supplemented: М.: Russkij Fond Sodejstviya Obrazovaniyu i Nauke, 2010. — 416 p. — ISBN 978-5-91244-019-9.

- Another Beginning. — М.: Nauka, 2003. — 432 p. — Series «A Word about Substance». — ISBN 5-02-026854-2.

Published posthumously:

- Wittgenstein. Change of Aspect (Смена аспекта). — М.: Institut filosofii, teologii i istorii sv. Fomy, 2005. — 576 p. — Series «Bibliotheca Ignatiana». — ISBN 5-94242-011-4.
- Алексей Федорович Лосев. Sergej Sergeevich Averintsev. — М.: Institut filosofii, teologii i istorii sv. Fomy, 2006. — 416 p. — Series «Bibliotheca Ignatiana». — ISBN 5-94242-027-0.
- Introduction to the Philosophy of Law (Введение в философию права). М. IF RAN (ИФ РАН), 2005. — 345 p. — ISBN 5-9540-0036-0.

2nd ed., corrected and supplemented: М.: Universitet Dm. Pozharskogo, 2013. — 584 p. — ISBN 978-5-91244-032-8.

- The Inner Form of the Word. — М.: Nauka, 2008. — 432 p. — Series «A Word about Substance» (Слово о сущем). — ISBN 978-5-02-026316-1.
- Grammar of Poetry. — SPB.: Ivan Limbakh, Publisher (Издательство Ивана Лимбаха), 2009. — 592 p. — ISBN 978-5-89059-115-9.
- The Diaries of Leo Tolstoy. — SPB.: Ivan Limbakh, Publisher (Издательство Ивана Лимбаха), 2012. — 480 p. — ISBN 978-5-89059-184-5.
- Early Heidegger. Materials for a Seminar. — М.: Institut filosofii, teologii i istorii sv. Fomy, 2009. — 536 p. — Series «Bibliotheca Ignatiana». — ISBN 978-5-94242-047-5.
- Reading Philosophy. — SPB.: Nauka, 2009. — 536 p. — Series «A Word about Substance» (Слово о сущем). — ISBN 978-5-02-026339-0.
- Energy. — М.: Institut filosofii, teologii i istorii sv. Fomy, 2010.
- "Ownness". The Philosophy of Oneself. (Собственность. Философия своего). — SPB.: Nauka, 2012. — 536 p. ISBN 978-5-02-037126-2.
- History of Contemporary Philosophy. SPB.: Vladimir Dal', 2014. 398 p. ISBN 978-5-93615-138-5.
- Time (Time-Being) (Пора (время-бытие)). SPB.: Vladimir Dal', 2015. 367 p. ISBN 978-5-93615-143-9.

== Author's courses ==
A list of author's courses lectured by Bibikhin in 1989–2004:

- World, Мир (1989, МГУ).
- Language of Philosophy, Язык философии (1989, ИФ РАН)
- Inner Word form, Внутренняя форма слова (1989—1990, МГУ)
- Discover yourself, Узнай себя (1989—1990, МГУ)
- Early Heidegger, Ранний Хайдеггер (1990—1992, МГУ)
- Energy, Энергия (1991—1992, МГУ); (2002, Свято-Филаретовский Богословский Институт)
- First Philosophy, Первая философия (Reading philosophy, Чтение философии) (1991—1992, МГУ)
- New Russian word, Новое русское слово (1992, МГУ)
- Leibniz, Лейбниц (Universal Science, Всеобщая наука) (1992, МГУ).
- The face of the Middle Ages: approaches to the study of the epoch, Лицо Средневековья: подходы к изучению эпохи (1992, МГУ).
- Renaissance: The image and place of revival in the history of culture, Ренессанс: образ и место Возрождения в истории культуры (1992, МГУ)
- Property, Собственность (Philosophy of its, философия своего) (1993—1994, МГУ).
- Wittgenstein, Витгенштейн (1994—1995, МГУ; 2003, МГУ)
- Time, Пора (Time-Genesis, время-бытие) (1995—1996, МГУ)
- The beginnings of Christianity, Начала христианства (1996—1997, МГУ)
- Forest, Лес (hyle) (1997—1998, МГУ)
- Really, Правда (Ontological Grounds of ethics, онтологические основания этики) (1998—1999, МГУ)
- Poetry grammar, Грамматика поэзии (2000, МГУ)
- Diaries of Leo Tolstoy, Дневники Льва Толстого (2000—2001 МГУ)
- Philosophy of Law, Философия права (2001—2002, МГУ, ИФ РАН)
- History of Modern philosophy, История современной философии (2002—2003, ИФТИ св. Фомы)
- Heidegger, Хайдеггер 1936—1944 гг. (2004, ИФ РАН)
