= Medal of 13 January =

Independence Medal
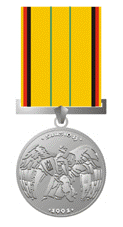
- Type: State decoration
- Awarded for: Restoration of Lithuania's independence
- Country: Lithuania
- Ribbon

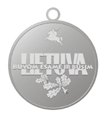
- Obverse
- Motto: Buvom, esam ir būsim (Lithuanian: Were, are and will be)
- Established: 1992

In Lithuania, the Medal of 13 January (Lithuanian: Sausio 13-osios atminimo medalis) is a state medal of Lithuania, awarded for the contributions in the restoration of the independence of the state. The medal is awarded to Lithuanian and foreign citizens for defending the freedom and independence of Lithuania in between January and September 1991. The name references the January Events, the end of which ended on 13 January 1991.

== Description ==
This is the largest award of the Republic of Lithuania: 4,326 (as of April 19, 2023). Lithuanian and foreign citizens have been honored with it. The author of the medal project is the sculptor Leonas Pivoriūnas

== Recipients ==
- Boris Yeltsin (9 January 1992)
- Zurab Zhvania
- Jacek Kuroń
- Mstislav Rostropovich (10 June 1992)
- Sergey Averintsev (19 January 1992)
- Anatolijs Gorbunovs
- Brian Mulroney (12 February 1992)
- Joe Clark (12 February 1992)

=== Dmitry Kiselyov ===
On April 3, 2014, by decree of Lithuanian President Dalia Grybauskaite, Russian journalist and TV presenter Dmitry Kiselyov was deprived of this medal, awarded to him in 1994, for what Grybauskaite designated as discrediting the title of the recipient by mocking the fundamental values of freedom and democracy on air.

On the same day, Russian TV presenter and journalist Tatyana Mitkova refused this medal as a sign of solidarity with Dmitry Kiselyov. On the air of her program. the TV presenter said: “I officially declare that I refuse the medal awarded to me at the same time and ask the President of Lithuania, Mrs. Grybauskaite, to remove me from the list of awardees.” On April 14, Tatyana Mitkova was deprived of the award by decree of Lithuanian President Dalia Grybauskaite.
