= The Lamb of God (book) =

Book by Sergej Boelgakov

The Lamb of God is the first part of a three book, comprehensive presentation of Eastern Orthodox theology by Sergei Bulgakov, first published in Russian in 1933 as Agnets Bozhyi by YMCA Press. The book is in effect a comprehensive presentation of the Eastern Orthodox Christological perspective, which is then followed by his other works on pneumatology.

The book's conceptual development draws on the pioneer liberal Orthodox dogmatics of Archimandrite Feodor and his development of kenotic Christology based on the Lamb of God.

== See also ==
- Lamb of God
- Agnus Dei

== Bibliography ==
- Bulgakov, Sergius (2008-01-02). The Lamb of God. Translated by Jakim, Boris. Grand Rapids, Michigan: William B. Eerdmans Publishing Co. p. 531. ISBN 978-0-8028-2779-1.
