= Sergey Averintsev =

Russian historian (1937–2004)

- Сергей Аверинцев
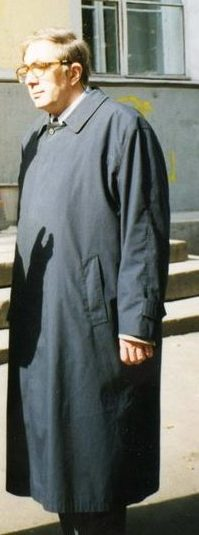
- Born: 10 December 1937; Moscow, Soviet Union
- Died: 21 February 2004 (aged 66); Vienna, Austria
- Resting place: Danilov Cemetery
- Education: Moscow State University
- Occupations: Scientist, historian
- Employer: Russian Academy of Sciences
- Awards: State Prize of the Russian Federaion; USSR State Prize; Medal of 13 January; Lenin Komsomol Prize
- Scientific career
- Fields: Slavist, Byzantist
- Doctoral advisor: Aleksei Losev; Sergei Radtsig

Sergey Sergeyevich Averintsev (Russian: Сергей Сергеевич Аверинцев; December 10, 1937, in Moscow – February 21, 2004, in Vienna) was a Russian literary scholar, Byzantinist and Slavist.

== Biography ==
Averintsev was the son of the biologist Sergey Vasilyevich Averintsev. He studied classical philology in Moscow and received in 1967 with a thesis on Plutarch the title of Candidate of the Sciences. In 1979, he became a Doctor of Sciences with a thesis on Byzantine literature.

He first worked as an editor, then from 1966 to 1971 at the Institute of Art Science of the Soviet Academy of Sciences. From 1971 to 1991, he was a member of the Gorki Institute for World Literature. In 1989, he became a professor at the Institute of the World Culture of the Moscow Lomonosov University. In 1994, he was appointed to the University of Vienna, where he was a full professor of East Slavonic literature until his death. Averintsev was from 1987 corresponding, from 2003 full member of the Russian Academy of Sciences. He was awarded the Lenin Komsomol Prize in 1968, the State Prize of the Soviet Union in 1990, and the State Prize of the Russian Federation in 1996. In 1994, he became a member of the Pontifical Academy of Social Sciences. In 1995, he was awarded the Dr. Leopold Lucas Prize for his essay "Die Solidarität in dem verfemten Gott. Die Erfahrung der Sowjetjahre als Mahnung für die Gegenwart und Zukunft".

In addition to his works in the field of ancient philology, Averintsev became known above all through studies of the Russian poetry of the Silver Age.

== Publications in Western European languages ==
=== Books ===
- L'anima e lo specchio. L'universo della poetica bizantina. Bologna, 1988 ISBN 9788815017727
- Atene e Gerusalemme. Contrapposizione e incontro di due principi creativi. Roma, 1994 ISBN 9788879890816
- (with M.I. Rupnik) Adamo e il suo costato. Spiritualità dell'amore coniugale. Roma, 1996 ISBN 978-8886517218
- Die Solidarität in dem verfemten Gott. Die Erfahrung der Sowjetjahre als Mahnung für die Gegenwart und Zukunft. Tübingen, 1996 ISBN 978-3-16-146540-6
- Sophia, la sapienza di Dio. Breve guida alla mostra. Milano, 1999

=== Collected studies ===
- Cose attuali, cose eterne: la Russia d'oggi e la cultura europea. Milano, 1989
- Dieci poeti. Ritratti e destini. Virgilio, Efrem Siro, Gregorio da Narek, Deržavin, Žukovskij, Vjačeslav Ivanov, Mandel’štam, Brentano, Chesterton, Hesse. Milano, 2001 ISBN 88-87240-26-4
- Die fremde Sprache sei mir eine Hülle... Essays und Vorträge. Wien, 2005 ISBN 3-9501769-4-2
- La sagesse et ses formes: Conception de la Sophia et sens de l'icône. Paris, 2011 ISBN 9782940402984
- Verbo di Dio e parola dell'uomo: Discorsi romani = Римские речи. Слово Божие и слово человеческое. Roma, Москва, 2013
- Ma liberté secrète: L'histoire culturelle vue de Russie. Grenoble, 2023 ISBN 978-2377474165

=== Articles in periodicals ===
- Averintsev, Sergej; Maslov, Boris (2021). "Toward an Interpretation of the Symbolism of the Oedipus Myth". Arion: A Journal of Humanities and the Classics. 29 (2): 99–123. doi:10.2307/arion.29.2.0099. JSTOR arion.29.2.0099. S2CID 245378845.
- Averintsev, Serge (2009). "Sur Simone Weil". Le Messager Orthodoxe. 149 (2): 35–38. S2CID 171154937.
- Averincev, Sergej (2008). "L'immagine di Gesù Cristo nella tradizione ortodossa". Nuova Europa (3): 60–77.
- Averintsev, Sergey (2004). "Overcoming the Totalitarian Past". Occasional Papers on Religion in Eastern Europe. 24 (3).
- Averincev, Sergej (2004). "Superare il totalitarismo, una sfida aperta". Nuova Europa (3): 23–30.
- Averintsev, Serge (2003). "Saint Benoît de Nursie et saint Serge de Radonège: essai de comparaison de types spirituels". Irénikon. 76 (2/3): 270–282.
- Averincev, Sergej S. (2003). "Die Ikone und das Problem der religiösen Selbstdarstellung". Homiletisch-liturgisches Korrespondenzblatt. Neue Folge. 21 (78): 21–26.
- Averintsev, Sergei (2002). "The feast of feasts. The mystery of orthodox Russian Easter". Rossica: International Review of Russian Culture (6): 44–51.
- Averincev, Sergej (2002). "Solidarietà fra generazioni e libertà civile". Nuova Europa (2): 30–40.
- Averincev, Sergej S. (2001). "Considerazioni sull'esperienza del Novecento". Linea Tempo: Itinerari di Ricerca Storica e Letteraria. 5 (2): 20–30.
- Averincev, Sergej (2001). "G.K. Chesterton, l'imprevedibilità del buon senso". Nuova Europa (2): 62–75.
- Averintsev, Sergei; Pevear, Richard; Volokhonsky, Larissa (2001). "Genre as Abstraction and Genres as Reality: The Dialectics of Closure and Openness". Arion: A Journal of Humanities and the Classics. 9 (1): 13–43. JSTOR 20163825.
- Averintsev, Sergei; Pevear, Richard; Volokhonsky, Larissa (1999). "Ancient Greek "Literature" and Near Eastern "Writings": The Opposition and Encounter of Two Creative Principles: Part One: The Opposition". Arion: A Journal of Humanities and the Classics. 7 (1): 1–39. JSTOR 20163739.
- Averintsev, Sergei; Pevear, Richard; Volokhonsky, Larissa (1999). "Ancient Greek "Literature" and Near Eastern "Writings": The Opposition and Encounter of Two Creative Principles: Part Two: The Encounter". Arion: A Journal of Humanities and the Classics. 7 (2): 1–26. JSTOR 20163753.
- Averintsev, Sergueï (1998). "Le mariage et la famille. Un regard chrétien à contre-temps". Marriage, Families & Spirituality. 4 (1): 36–51. doi:10.2143/INT.4.1.2014777.
- Averintsev, Sergueï (1998). "Nations et religions". Études. 388 (1): 25–28. S2CID 151589842.
- Averintsev, S. S. (1998). "Bajtín, la risa, la cultura cristiana". Acta Poética. 18 (1–2): 25–46. doi:10.19130/iifl.ap.1998.1-2.471.
- Averincev, Sergej (1997). "I modelli confessionali della cultura cristiana nel pensiero del primo O. Mandel'štam". Annali di Ca' Foscari. Rivista della facoltà di lingue e letterature straniere dell'Università di Venezia. 36 (1–2): 163–173.
- Averincev, Sergej (1997). "Hanno detto di lui". Nuova Europa (7): 57–64.
- Averincev, Sergej (1997). "Parliamo serenamente di temi inquietanti". Nuova Europa (6): 49–53.
- Averintsev, Serguei (1997). "Humorlosigkeit des Zeitgeistes". Conturen. Das Magazin zur Zeit (1): 56–60.
- Averintsev, Serguei (1996). "Zur Auswirkung der russischen sakralen Diglossie: Segen und Unheil". Stimme der Orthodoxie (3): 5–7.
- Averincev, Sergej (1996). "Parola divina e parola umana". Nuova Europa (2): 5–20.
- Averincev, Sergej (1995). "Il senso della fede e le forme della cultura". Nuova Europa (1): 5–16.
- Averintsev, Sergej S. (1994). "The Image of the Virgin Mary in Russian Piety". Gregorianum. 75 (4): 611–622. JSTOR 23579744.
- Averintsev, Sergej (1994). "L'aristotelismo cristiano come forma interiore della tradizione occidentale e i problemi della Russia attuale". Nuova civiltà delle macchine. 12 (1): 128–134.
- Averintsev, Serge (1994). "Les motifs religieux dans les poésies de jeunesse d'Ossip Mandelstam". Istina. 39 (3): 229–241.
- Averincev, Sergej (1994). "Il futuro del cristianesimo in Europa". Nuova Europa (1): 5–18.
- Averintsev, S. (1993). "L'âme russe entre l'enfer et la grâce". La Croix (20-21 June).
- Averincev, Sergej (1993). "Noi e la gerarchia, ieri e oggi". Nuova Europa (1): 19–36.
- Awerinzew, Sergej S. (1992). "Griechischer Geist und orientalische Weisheit. Zwei Prinzipien des Schöpferischen in "Literatur" und "Erzählkunst"". Lettre internationale (16): 52–64.
- Awerinzew, Sergej (1991). "Wenn die Hand sich nicht zur Faust ballt. Nationaler Egoismus versus Xenophobie". Kontinent: Ost-West-Forum. 17 (1): 40–43.
- Averintsev, Serge (1991). "L'Union Soviétique et l'Europe". Le Messager Orthodoxe. 116 (1): 73–79.
- Averintsev, Serge (1991). "Un missionnaire pour une tribu d'intellectuels". Le Messager Orthodoxe. 116 (1): 69–72.
- Averincev, Sergej (1991). "Padre Aleksandr, missionario nella tribù degli intellettuali". L'Altra Europa (6): 59–62.
- Averincev, Sergej (1991). "Religiosità e poesia nel giovane Mandel'stam". L'Altra Europa (4): 23–40.
- Averincev, Sergej (1991). "Il cimento della "parola"". L'Altra Europa (2): 7–16.
- Averintsev, S. (1992). "Bysans och Ryssland: två typer av andlighet". Ord&Bild (1): 93–104.
- Averintsev, S. (1991). "Bysans och Ryssland: två typer av andlighet". Ord&Bild (4): 65–79.
- Avérintsev, Serguei S. (1990). "La movilidad histórica de la categoría de género: un intento de periodización". Criterios (25–28): 208–220.
- Averincev, Sergej (1990). "Che cosa ci aspettiamo dalla nuova legge?". L'Altra Europa (5): 127–146.
- Averincev, Sergej (1990). "In memoria di Sacharov". L'Altra Europa (1): 137–140.
- Awerinzew, Sergej S. (1990). "Christentum und Macht in der russischen Tradition". Lettre internationale (9): 54–58.
- Averintsev, Sergei (1989). "The Idea of Holy Russia". History Today. 39 (11): 37–44.
- Averintsev, Sergei (1989). "Byzantium and Medieval Russia: Two Types of Spirituality". Social Sciences. 20 (3): 73–89.
- Averintsev, Sergei (1989). "Byzantium and Medieval Russia: Two Types of Spirituality. Second article". Social Sciences. 20 (4): 126–140.
- Averintsev, Sergei (1989). "Byzantium and Medieval Russia: Two Types of Spirituality". Soviet Literature (5): 126–139.
- Averintsev, Sergei (1989). "Byzantium and Medieval Russia: The Law and Mercy". Soviet Literature (7): 169–179.
- Averintsev, Sergei S. (1989). "Poetry, freedom and revolution". The Courier. 42 (6): 36–39.
- Averintsev, Sergei (1989). "Holy Freedom: Echoes of the Great French Revolution in Russian Culture". Soviet Literature (12): 168–171.
- Averincev, Sergej (1989). "Tu, sacra libertà (Echi della rivoluzione francese nella cultura russa)". L'Altra Europa (6): 17–22.
- Averincev, Sergej (1989). "Appello alla coscienza". L'Altra Europa (5): 5–16.
- Averintsev, Sergei S. (1988). "Beauty, sanctity and truth: the philosophy of the icon". The Courier. 41 (6): 9–13.
- Averintsev, Sergei (1988). "Mikhail Bakhtin: Retrospective and Perspective". Soviet Literature (8): 124–128.
- Averincev, Sergej (1988). "Il Battesimo della Rus' e il cammino della cultura russa". L'Altra Europa (6): 5–14.
- Averincev, Sergej (1988). "La bellezza della Chiesa". L'Altra Europa (3): 71–82.
- Averintsev, Sergei (1985). "Attic rationalism and encyclopedic rationalism: an essay on the concatenation of epochs". Diogenes. 33 (130): 1–11. doi:10.1177/039219218503313001. S2CID 147136696.
- Averintsev, Sergueï (1985). "Rationalisme attique et rationalisme encyclopédique: Essai sur l'enchainement des époques". Diogène (130): 3–14.
- Averintsev, Sergei (1980). "The Changing Image of Antiquity". Social Sciences. 11 (3): 138–153.
- Averincev, Sergej (1979). "L'or dans le système des symboles de la culture protobyzantine". Studi Medievali. 20 (1): 47–67.
- Averincev, Sergej (1977). "Notion de l'homme et tradition littéraire à Byzance". Studi Medievali. 18 (1): 1–38.
- Averintsev, Sergei (1977). "Interpretation of the past". Social Sciences. 8 (3): 122–130.
- Averintsev, Sergei (1977). "[On Mikhail Bakhtin]". Soviet Literature (1): 145–151.
- Averintsev, Sergei (1970). "In praise of philology". Soviet Literature (7–12): 10–12.
- Awerinzew, S. (1968). "Die "Kulturmorphologie" Oswald Spenglers". Kunst und Literatur (8): 771–788.

=== Contributions to books ===
- 'Quelques mots personnels', in S. Averintsev, Ma liberté secrète: L'histoire culturelle vue de Russie. Grenoble, 2023
- '2 000 ans avec Virgile', in S. Averintsev, Ma liberté secrète: L'histoire culturelle vue de Russie. Grenoble, 2023
- 'Sur Simone Weil', in S. Averintsev, Ma liberté secrète: L'histoire culturelle vue de Russie. Grenoble, 2023
- 'La poésie de Clemens Brentano', in S. Averintsev, Ma liberté secrète: L'histoire culturelle vue de Russie. Grenoble, 2023
- 'Destin et message d’Ossip Mandelstam', in S. Averintsev, Ma liberté secrète: L'histoire culturelle vue de Russie. Grenoble, 2023
- 'Gilbert Keith Chesterton ou l’imprévisible bon sens de l’esprit', in S. Averintsev, Ma liberté secrète: L'histoire culturelle vue de Russie. Grenoble, 2023
- 'Éloge de la philologie', in S. Averintsev, Ma liberté secrète: L'histoire culturelle vue de Russie. Grenoble, 2023
- 'Philologie', in S. Averintsev, Ma liberté secrète: L'histoire culturelle vue de Russie. Grenoble, 2023
- 'Logos, in S. Averintsev, Ma liberté secrète: L'histoire culturelle vue de Russie. Grenoble, 2023
- 'Des rives du Bosphore aux rives de l’Euphrate, in S. Averintsev, Ma liberté secrète: L'histoire culturelle vue de Russie. Grenoble, 2023
- 'Nous et nos hiérarques — hier et aujourd’hui, in S. Averintsev, Ma liberté secrète: L'histoire culturelle vue de Russie. Grenoble, 2023
- 'Tentatives d’explication. Conversations sur la culture, in S. Averintsev, Ma liberté secrète: L'histoire culturelle vue de Russie. Grenoble, 2023
- 'Le totalitarisme : une réponse erronée à des questions réelles, in S. Averintsev, Ma liberté secrète: L'histoire culturelle vue de Russie. Grenoble, 2023
- 'La tradition spirituelle de l’Europe orientale et son influence dans la formation d’une nouvelle identité européenne, in S. Averintsev, Ma liberté secrète: L'histoire culturelle vue de Russie. Grenoble, 2023
- 'Vers une définition de l’homme, in S. Averintsev, Ma liberté secrète: L'histoire culturelle vue de Russie. Grenoble, 2023
- 'Verbo di Dio e parola dell'uomo = Слово Божие и слово человеческое', in S. Averintsev, Verbo di Dio e parola dell'uomo: Discorsi romani = Римские речи. Слово Божие и слово человеческое. (Roma, Москва, 2013), 78-117
- 'Della Sapienza dobbiamo parlare con sapienza = О Премудрости мы должны говорить с мудростью', in S. Averintsev, Verbo di Dio e parola dell'uomo: Discorsi romani = Римские речи. Слово Божие и слово человеческое. (Roma, Москва, 2013), 118-125
- 'La Sofia nell'Antico Testamento = Премудрость в Ветхом Завете', in S. Averintsev, Verbo di Dio e parola dell'uomo: Discorsi romani = Римские речи. Слово Божие и слово человеческое. (Roma, Москва, 2013), 126-159
- 'Sofiologia e mariologia: pre-considerazioni metodologiche = Софиология и мариология: методологические размышления', in S. Averintsev, Verbo di Dio e parola dell'uomo: Discorsi romani = Римские речи. Слово Божие и слово человеческое. (Roma, Москва, 2013), 160-189
- 'Sofiologia e mariologia: note introduttive = Софиология и мариология: предварительные замечания', in S. Averintsev, Verbo di Dio e parola dell'uomo: Discorsi romani = Римские речи. Слово Божие и слово человеческое. (Roma, Москва, 2013), 190-201
- 'La Sapienza di Dio ha costruito una casa (Pr 9,1) per la dimora di Dio stesso tra noi: il concetto di Sofia e il significato dell’icona = Премудрость Божия построила дом (Притчи 9:1), чтобы Бог пребывал с нами: концепция Софии и смысл иконы', in S. Averintsev, Verbo di Dio e parola dell'uomo: Discorsi romani = Римские речи. Слово Божие и слово человеческое. (Roma, Москва, 2013), 202-229
- 'Per comprendere l'iscrizione sulla conca dell'abside centrale della chiesa della Sofia in Kiev = К уяснению смысла надписи над конхой центральной апсиды Софии Киевской', in S. Averintsev, Verbo di Dio e parola dell'uomo: Discorsi romani = Римские речи. Слово Божие и слово человеческое. (Roma, Москва, 2013), 230-341
- 'Sofia = София', in S. Averintsev, Verbo di Dio e parola dell'uomo: Discorsi romani = Римские речи. Слово Божие и слово человеческое. (Roma, Москва, 2013), 342-353
- 'Sofia, l'idea russa = София как русская идея', in S. Averintsev, Verbo di Dio e parola dell'uomo: Discorsi romani = Римские речи. Слово Божие и слово человеческое. (Roma, Москва, 2013), 354-359
- 'Discorso per l'inauguratione della mostra "Sophia, la sapienza di Dio" = Речь на открытии выставки "София, Премудрость Божия"', in S. Averintsev, Verbo di Dio e parola dell'uomo: Discorsi romani = Римские речи. Слово Божие и слово человеческое. (Roma, Москва, 2013), 360-387
- 'Breve guida alla mostra = Краткий путеводитель по выставке', in S. Averintsev, Verbo di Dio e parola dell'uomo: Discorsi romani = Римские речи. Слово Божие и слово человеческое. (Roma, Москва, 2013), 388-439
- 'La sapienza nella prospettiva delle scienze = Премудрость в перспективе наук', in S. Averintsev, Verbo di Dio e parola dell'uomo: Discorsi romani = Римские речи. Слово Божие и слово человеческое. (Roma, Москва, 2013), 440-445
- 'L'immagine biblica della sapienza come alternativa alla "cultura della morte" = Библейский образ Премудрости как альтернатива "культуре смерти"', in S. Averintsev, Verbo di Dio e parola dell'uomo: Discorsi romani = Римские речи. Слово Божие и слово человеческое. (Roma, Москва, 2013), 446-467
- 'Improvisso = Импровизация', in S. Averintsev, Verbo di Dio e parola dell'uomo: Discorsi romani = Римские речи. Слово Божие и слово человеческое. (Roma, Москва, 2013), 468-471
- '"Ad fontes!" (Atene, Gerusalemme, Roma). Tesi = "Ad fontes!" (Афины, Иерусалим, Рим). Тезисы', in S. Averintsev, Verbo di Dio e parola dell'uomo: Discorsi romani = Римские речи. Слово Божие и слово человеческое. (Roma, Москва, 2013), 472-479
- '"Ad fontes!" (Athens, Jerusalem, Rome) Theses', in S. Averintsev, Verbo di Dio e parola dell'uomo: Discorsi romani = Римские речи. Слово Божие и слово человеческое. (Roma, Москва, 2013), 480-483
- 'La solidarietà nel Dio proscritto: l'esperienza degli anni sovietici come monito per il presente e per il futuro = Солидарность во имя опального Бога: опыт советского времени как предостережение для настоящего времени и на будущее', in S. Averintsev, Verbo di Dio e parola dell'uomo: Discorsi romani = Римские речи. Слово Божие и слово человеческое. (Roma, Москва, 2013), 484-519
- 'Vjačeslav Ivanov e la "Schuldfrage" = Вячеслав Иванов и "Schuldfrage"', in S. Averintsev, Verbo di Dio e parola dell'uomo: Discorsi romani = Римские речи. Слово Божие и слово человеческое. (Roma, Москва, 2013), 520-531
- 'Il battesimo della Rus' e il cammino della cultura russa = Крещение Руси и путь русской культуры', in S. Averintsev, Verbo di Dio e parola dell'uomo: Discorsi romani = Римские речи. Слово Божие и слово человеческое. (Roma, Москва, 2013), 532-561
- 'La Russia e la cristianità europea = Россия и европейское христианство', in S. Averintsev, Verbo di Dio e parola dell'uomo: Discorsi romani = Римские речи. Слово Божие и слово человеческое. (Roma, Москва, 2013), 562-599
- 'La spiritualità dell'Europa orientale e il suo contributo alla formazione della nuova identità europea = Духовность Восточной Европы и ее вклад в формирование новой европейской идентичности', in S. Averintsev, Verbo di Dio e parola dell'uomo: Discorsi romani = Римские речи. Слово Божие и слово человеческое. (Roma, Москва, 2013), 600-637
- 'Il ruschio della teocrazia = Риск теократии', in S. Averintsev, Verbo di Dio e parola dell'uomo: Discorsi romani = Римские речи. Слово Божие и слово человеческое. (Roma, Москва, 2013), 638-645
- '"Ut unum sint": uniti dinanzi al sembiante ostile del principe di questo mondo = "Ut unum sint": единство перед лицом вражды князя мира сего', in S. Averintsev, Verbo di Dio e parola dell'uomo: Discorsi romani = Римские речи. Слово Божие и слово человеческое. (Roma, Москва, 2013), 646-669
- 'Sagesse divine - l'inscription de Sainte-Sophie de Kiev', in S. Averintsev, La sagesse et ses formes: Conception de la Sophia et sens de l'icône. (Paris, 2011), 13-64
- 'Pour que Dieu soit avec nous', in S. Averintsev, La sagesse et ses formes: Conception de la Sophia et sens de l'icône. (Paris, 2011)
- 'Sophiologie et mariologie', in S. Averintsev, La sagesse et ses formes: Conception de la Sophia et sens de l'icône. (Paris, 2011)
- 'La Beauté première', in S. Averintsev, La sagesse et ses formes: Conception de la Sophia et sens de l'icône. (Paris, 2011), 93-101
- 'Constantinople/Byzantium. VI. Literature', in Religion Past & Present: Encyclopedia of Theology and Religion, Vol. 3 (Leiden, 2007), 445-447
- 'Foreword', in G. Bunge, The Rublev Trinity: The Icon of the Trinity by the Monk-painter Andrei Rublev, 11-12
- 'Some constant characteristics of Byzantine Orthodoxy', in Byzantine Orthodoxies. Papers from the Thirty-Sixth Spring Symposium of Byzantine Studies, University of Durham, 23–25 March 2002, ed. A. Louth, A. Casiday (Aldershot, 2006), 215-228
- 'Historismus à la russe – Alexej Konstantinovič Tolstoj', in 19./20. Jahrhundert: von den Reformen Alexanders II. bis zum Ersten Weltkrieg, ed. D. Herrmann (München, 2006), 366-386
- 'Alexei Konstantinowitsch Tolstoi (1817–1875): Historismus à la Russe', in S. Awerinzew, Die fremde Sprache sei mir eine Hülle... Essays und Vorträge (Wien, 2005), 11-30
- 'Das Neue Testament und die hellenistischen Literaturgattungen', in S. Awerinzew, Die fremde Sprache sei mir eine Hülle... Essays und Vorträge (Wien, 2005), 31-44
- 'Die Idee des “Imperium Sacrum” in Byzanz und Russland: Kontinuität und Evolution', in S. Awerinzew, Die fremde Sprache sei mir eine Hülle... Essays und Vorträge (Wien, 2005), 45-62
- 'Die slawische Apokalyptik', in S. Awerinzew, Die fremde Sprache sei mir eine Hülle... Essays und Vorträge (Wien, 2005), 63-68
- 'Die Solidarität in dem verfemten Gott. Die Erfahrung der Sowjetjahre als Mahnung für Gegenwart und Zukunft', in S. Awerinzew, Die fremde Sprache sei mir eine Hülle... Essays und Vorträge (Wien, 2005), 69-80
- 'Gegenwärtige Geistesströmungen in Russland', in S. Awerinzew, Die fremde Sprache sei mir eine Hülle... Essays und Vorträge (Wien, 2005), 81-96
- 'Goethe und Puschkin (1749–1799–1999)', in S. Awerinzew, Die fremde Sprache sei mir eine Hülle... Essays und Vorträge (Wien, 2005), 97-112
- 'Humorlosigkeit des Zeitgeistes', in S. Awerinzew, Die fremde Sprache sei mir eine Hülle... Essays und Vorträge (Wien, 2005), 113-118
- 'Das Heilige als Aufgabe für Reflexion und Erlebnis im Kontext der Polarität von “Omnipräsenz” und “Realpräsenz”', in S. Awerinzew, Die fremde Sprache sei mir eine Hülle... Essays und Vorträge (Wien, 2005), 119-128
- 'Jesus in der Orthodoxen Christenheit', in S. Awerinzew, Die fremde Sprache sei mir eine Hülle... Essays und Vorträge (Wien, 2005), 129-144
- '“Die fremde Sprache sei mir eine Hülle...“ Ossip Mandelschtam denkt an Ewald Kleist', in S. Awerinzew, Die fremde Sprache sei mir eine Hülle... Essays und Vorträge (Wien, 2005), 145-164
- 'Russische Kultur und europäische Christenheit', in S. Awerinzew, Die fremde Sprache sei mir eine Hülle... Essays und Vorträge (Wien, 2005), 165-180
- 'Vom Wesen der Ikone. Zwei Betrachtungen', in S. Awerinzew, Die fremde Sprache sei mir eine Hülle... Essays und Vorträge (Wien, 2005), 181-186
- 'Zum Problem der Globalisierung', in S. Awerinzew, Die fremde Sprache sei mir eine Hülle... Essays und Vorträge (Wien, 2005), 187-196
- 'Kafka und die biblische Alternative zum allgemeinen europaischen Typus der narrativen Kultur', in S. Awerinzew, Die fremde Sprache sei mir eine Hülle... Essays und Vorträge (Wien, 2005), 197-206
- 'Fass des Unfassbaren – Poetik und Dialektik des Ὕμνος Ἀκάθιστος"', in Christus bei den Vätern. Forscher aus dem Osten und Westen Europas an den Quellen des gemeinsamen Glaubens, ed. Y. de Andia, P.L. Hofrichter (Innsbruck, Wien, 2004), 99-109
- 'Jesus in der Orthodoxen Christenheit', in Jesus: Mensch und Geheimnis in Glauben und Kunst, ed. I.F. Görres, W. Ziehr, D. Flusser (Freiburg, 2004)
- 'Sulla classicita dell'opera di Puškin', in Atti del Convegno Internationale, Milano 1999, 3-4 giugno (Milano, 2004), 39-46
- 'La spiritualità dell'Europa orientale e il suo contributo alla formazione della nuova identità europea', in La filosofia dell'Europa: febbraio 2003-giugno 2003, Roma, Sala Zuccari, ed. E. Berti (Roma, 2004)
- 'Goethe und Puschkin (1749–1799–1999)', in Alexander S. Puschkin und das europäische Geistes- und Kulturleben, ed. E. Vyslonzil (Frankfurt am Main, 2003), 19-32
- 'From Biography to Hagiography: Some Stable Patterns in the Greek and Latin Tradition of Lives', in Mapping Lives: The Uses of Biography, ed. P. France, W. St Clair (Oxford, 2002), 19–36
- 'Jerusalem, mother to us all: The Holy Land is the true navel of the world = Gerusalemme, nostra madre commune: La Terra Santa é il vero ombelico del mondo', in A Window over the Mediterranean sea = Finestra sul Mediterraneo, ed. S. Buonadonna (Genova, 2001)
- 'Bakhtin, Laughter, and Christian Culture', in Bakhtin and Religion: A Feeling for Faith, ed. S.M. Felch, P.J. Contino (Evanston, 2001), 79–98
- 'La collocazione storica di Puškin al tramonto del razionalismo retorico', in Puškin europeo, ed. S. Graciotti (Venezia, 2001), 21-30
- 'Duemila anni con Virgilio', in S. Averincev, Dieci poeti. Ritratti e destini (Milano, 2001), 19-42
- 'Tra "esplicazione" e "nascondimento": la situazione dell’immagine nella poesia di Efrem Siro', in S. Averincev, Dieci poeti. Ritratti e destini (Milano, 2001)
- 'La poesia di Gregorio da Narek', in S. Averincev, Dieci poeti. Ritratti e destini (Milano, 2001)
- 'La poesia di Deržavin', in S. Averincev, Dieci poeti. Ritratti e destini (Milano, 2001), 103-115
- 'Riflessioni sulle traduzioni di Žukovskij', in S. Averincev, Dieci poeti. Ritratti e destini (Milano, 2001), 117-138
- 'La poesia di Clemens Brentano', in S. Averincev, Dieci poeti. Ritratti e destini (Milano, 2001)
- 'G.K. Chesterton, l’imprevedibilità del buon senso', in S. Averincev, Dieci poeti. Ritratti e destini (Milano, 2001)
- 'Hermann Hesse', in S. Averincev, Dieci poeti. Ritratti e destini (Milano, 2001)
- 'Vjačeslav Ivanov, il maestro dell'anamnesi universale in Christo', in La poetica della fede nel'900: letteratura e cattolicesimo nel secolo della "morte di Dio" (Firenze, 2000), 81-94
- 'Belleza e santita', in Forme della santita russa: atti dell’VIII Convegno ecumenico internazionale di spiritualità ortodossa (sezione russa), Bose, 21-23 settembre 2000, ed. A. Mainardi (Bose, 2000), 315–332
- 'Ricerca di Dio e ritorno alla Chiesa: l'intelligencija sovietica e il problema religioso', in La notte della chiesa russa: atti dell'VII Convegno ecumenico internazionale di spiritualità russa: "La chiesa ortodossa russa dal 1943 ai nostri giorni", Bose, 15-18 settembre 1999, ed. A. Mainardi (Bose, 2000), 175-190
- 'God's Wisdom Building a "House" (Prov. 9,1) for God's Own Dwelling with Us: the Concept of Sophia and the Meaning of Icon', in Jews and Eastern Slavs: Essays on Intercultural Relations, ed. W. Moskovich, L. Finberg, M. Feller (Jerusalem, 2000), 11-18
- 'Della Sapienza dobbiamo parlare con sapienza', in Sophia. La Sapienza di Dio, ed. G.C. Azzaro, P. Azzaro (Roma, Milano, 1999), ix
- 'La Sapienza di Dio ha costruito una casa (Pr 9,1) per la dimora di Dio stesso tra noi: il concetto di Sofia e il significato dell’icona', in Sophia. La Sapienza di Dio, ed. G.C. Azzaro, P. Azzaro (Roma, Milano, 1999), 3-7
- 'Sofiologia e Mariologia: osservazioni preliminari', in Sophia. La Sapienza di Dio, ed. G.C. Azzaro, P. Azzaro (Roma, Milano, 1999), 9-13
- 'L’Icona e il problema della rappresentazione religiosa', in Il mondo e il sovra-mondo dell’icona, ed. S. Gracciotti (Venezia, 1998), 1-6
- 'Temi cristiani della cultura russa e l’Occidente: alcune osservazioni', in La sfida della comunione nella diversità. Atti del Convegno internazionale di studio della fondazione Russia Cristiana. (Milano, 1998), 59-67
- 'Reconstruire le langage, reconstruire la pensée?', in La Vendée: après la Terreur, la reconstruction. Acte du Colloque tenu à La Roche-sur-Yon les 25, 26 et 27 avril 1996, ed. A. Gérard (Paris, 1997), 561-566
- 'Einige Bemerkungen zur Eigenart der Aneignung der christlichen Kultur im vorpetrinischen Russland', in Sophia – Die Weisheit Gottes. Gesammelte Aufsatze 1983-1995, ed. S.F.v. Lilienfeld (Erlangen, 1997), 546-553
- 'Kafka und die biblische Alternative zum allgemeinen europaischen Typus der narrativen Kultur', in Das Phänomen Franz Kafka. Vorträge des Symposions der Österreichischen Franz Kafka-Gesellschaft in Klosterneuburg im Jahr 1995, ed. W. Kraus, N. Winkler (Praha, 1997), 1-14
- 'Das Neue Testament und die hellenistischen Literaturgattungen', in Hellenismus. Beitrage zur Erforschung von Akkulturation und politischer Ordnung in den Staaten des hellenistischen Zeitalters. Akten des Internationalen Hellenismus-Kolloquiums, 9.–14. Marz 1994 in Berlin, ed. B. Funck (Tübingen, 1996), 307-318
- 'Der Neoplatonismus aus der Sicht der platonischen Kritik des mythisch-poetischen Denkens', in Philosophiegeschichte und Hermeneutik, ed. V. Caysa, K.-D. Eichler. (Leipzig 1996), 196-205
- 'Verbe de Dieu et parole humaine', in Face à la Création. La responsabilité de l'homme. Rencontre entre l'Est et l'Ouest. Novgorod-Saint Petersbourg, 28 août-2 septembre 1995, ed. M.-J. Guillaume (Mame, 1996), 75-86
- 'Ut unum sint: L’Unité face au Prince de ce monde', in L’Unité, ed. P. de Laubier. (Fribourg, 1996), 13-28.
- 'Imago Mundi : dal mito alla scienza', in La nuova immagine del mondo: Il dialogo tra scienza e fede dopo Galileo. Roma, 1996, 37-52.
- 'Il cattolicesimo italiano attraverso gli occhi dei russi', in I russi e l'Italia, ed. V. Strada (Milano, 1995), 51-56
- 'Byzantium and Medieval Russia: Two Types of Spirituality', in Roots of Russia: Paving the Way, ed. N.Maslova, T.Pleshakova. (New York, 1995), 7-24
- '”Imago Mundi”. Du mythe à la science', in Après Galilée. Science et foi: nouveau dialogue. (Paris, 1994), 111–122
- 'Die slawische Apokalyptik', in Europa, Europa. Das Jahrhundert der Avantgarde in Mittel- und Osteuropa. Kunst- und Ausstellungshalle der Bundesrepublik Deutschland, Bonn, 27. Mai – 16. Oktober 1994, ed. R. Stanislawski, C. Brockhaus. (Bonn, 1994), 32-34
- ‘Zum Geleit’, in ‘’Der andere Paraklet. Die Ikone der Heiligen Dreifaltigkeit des Malermönchs Andrej Rubljov’’. (Würzburg, 1994), 7-8
- (with M.L. Andreev, M.L. Gasparov, P.A. Grintser, A.V. Mikhailov) ‘Literary epochs and types of artistic consciousness’ in Историческая поэтика. Литературные эпохи и типы художественного сознания, ed. P.A. Grintser. Москва, 1994, 481-509
- 'Bakhtin and the Russian attitude to laughter', in Bakhtin: Carnival and other subjects, ed. D.G. Shepherd (Amsterdam, 1993), 13-19
- ‘Simbolo’, in Bachtin e ... Averincev, Benjamin, Freud, Greimas, Lévinas, Marx, Peirce, Valéry, Welby, Yourcenar, ed. P. Jachia, A. Ponzio. (Roma-Bari, 1993), 197-209
- 'The Baptism of Rus' and the path of Russian culture', in The Christianization of ancient Russia, a millennium: 988-1988, ed. Y. Hamant (Paris, 1992), 139-147
- 'Moscou, troisième Rome: essence et prémisses d'une idée', in Histoire de la littérature russe: des origines aux Lumières, ed. E. Etkind, G. Nivat, I. Serman, V. Strada (Paris, 1992), 185-193
- 'El Aristotelismo Cristiano como forma de la Tradición Occidental', in Cristianismo y cultura en Europa. (Madrid, 1992), 54-58
- 'La vocazione della filosofia e unità della Chiesa', in Cristianesimo e cultura in Europa. Memoria, coscienza, progetto. Atti del Simposio presinodale. (Stato della Città del Vaticano, 1992)
- 'Visions of the Invisible: the dual nature of the icon', in Gates of Mystery: The Art of Holy Russia, ed. R. Grierson (Fort Worth, TX, 1992), 11–14
- 'Vom Wesen der Ikone. Zwei Betrachtungen = О сущности иконы. Два соображения', in Sowjetische Kunst um 1990 = Советское Искусство около 1990 года, ed. J. Harten. (Köln, 1991), 16-19
- 'Il mistero dell'oro nell'icona', in Icona: volto del mistero, ed. A. Vicini (Milano, 1991), 41–46
- 'The Idea of Holy Russia', in Russia and Europe, ed. P. Dukes. (London, 1991), 10-23
- ‘Vorbemerkung’, in ‘’Ossip Mandelstam. Das zweite Leben. Späte Gedichte und Notizen’’. (München, Wien, 1991), 7-12
- 'Das byzantinische Erbe der Rus' und seine Wirkung auf das russische Sprachgefühl', in Tausend Jahre Christentum in Rußland, ed. K. Felmy. (Göttingen, 1988), 103-121
- 'Témoins de la production intellectuelle de l’Antiquité et du Moyen Age: quelques considérations', in La naissance du texte. Archives européennes et production intellectuelle, Colloque international 21-23 Septembre 1987. (Paris, 1987), 213-215
- 'Die Symbolik des frühen Mittelalters. Zu einem Problemkreis', in Studien zur Geschichte der westlichen Philosophie. (Frankfurt a. M., 1986), 72-104
- 'Dauer im Wechsel: Krise und Identität der abendländischen Vergil-Tradition', in Zum Problem der Geschichtlichkeit ästhetischer Normen. Die Antike im Wandel des Urteils des 19. Jahrhunderts. (Berlin, 1986), 39-45
- 'The Poetry of Vyacheslav Ivanov', in Vyacheslav Ivanov: Poet, Critic and Philosopher, ed. R.L. Jackson, L. Nelson, Jr. (New Haven, 1986), 25-48
- 'Aux sources de la terminologie philosophique européenne', in La Philosophie grecque et sa portée culturelle et historique, ed. S. Mouraviev, A. Garcia (Москва, 1985), 11-38
- 'Alcune considerazioni sulla tradizione virgiliana nella letteratura europea', in Atti del convegno mondiale di studi su Virgilio” a cura dell’Accademia Nazionale Virgiliana, Mantova-Roma-Napoli, 19-24 settembre 1981, vol. 1. (Milano, 1984), 110–122
- 'Eine römische Sophia-Inschrift aus dem 12. Jahrhundert', in Unser ganzes Leben Christus unserm Gott überantworten. Studien zur ostkirchlichen Spiritualität. Fairy v. Lilienfeld zum 65. Geburtstag, ed. P. Hauptmann (Göttingen, 1982), 240-244
- 'Zu den Ethopoiien des Nikephoros Basilakes', in Eikon und Logos: Beiträge zur Erforschung byzantinischer Kulturtraditionen. Konrad Onasch zur Vollendung des 65. Lebensjahres, vol. 1, ed. H. Goltz (Halle, 1981), 9-14
- 'Das dauerhafte Erbe der Griechen: Die rhetorische Grundeinstellung als Synthese des Traditionalismus und der Reflexion', in Proceedings of the IXth Congress of the International Comparative Literature Association, Innsbruck, 1979. (Innsbruck, 1981), 267-270
- 'Zum Problem des Historismus in der Analyse der symbolischen Strukturen', in Proceedings of the VIIIth Congress of the International Comparative Literature Association, Budapest 1976, vol. 2. (Stuttgart, 1980), 711-715
- 'Interpretation of the Past', in Aesthetics and the Development of Literature, ed. L. Gerasimova, N. Maslova. 2ed. (Москва, 1980), 160–173
- 'Tolstoï et le monde antique', in Tolstoï aujourd'hui: Colloque international Tolstoï tenu à Paris du 10 au 13 octobre 1978, à l'occasion du cent-cinquantième anniversaire de la naissance de Léon Tolstoï. (Paris, 1980), 71-76
- 'L'interprétation du passé', in L'esthétique et le développement de la littérature. (Москва, 1979), 167–180
- 'Le caractère général de la symbolique au Haut Moyen Age', in Travaux sur les systèmes de signes: école de Tartu. (Bruxelles, 1976), 152-155

== Bibliography ==
- Miller-Pogacar A. Transculture and Culturology: Post-Structuralist Theory in Late and Post-Soviet Russia. PhD Thesis, University of Kansas, 1993
- Pyman-Sokolov, A. ‘In memoriam. Sergei Sergeevich Averintsev, 10 December 1937 – 21 February 2004, in Slavonica, Vol.10, No.2, 2004, 195-201
- Sedakova, O. 'Reflections on Averintsev's Method', in Studies in East European Thought, Vol. 58, No. 2, 2006, 73-84
- Sigov, K. 'Averintsev's Archipelago: Towards Understanding the Era of Post-Atheism, in Studies in East European Thought, Vol. 58, No. 2, 2006, 85-93
- Wort – Geist – Kultur: Gedenkschrift für Sergej S. Averincev, ed. J. Besters-Dilger et al. Frankfurt am Main, 2007 ISBN 978-3-631-53651-3
- Janocha, M. 'Serge Averintsev. Byzantinologie dans la perspective humaniste', in Towards Rewriting? New Approaches to Byzantine Art and Archaeology, ed. P.Ł. Grotowski. Warsaw, 2010, 283-292
- Marchadier, B. ' Serge Averintsev - la philologie comme retour au Logos', in S. Averintsev, La sagesse et ses formes: Conception de la Sophia et sens de l'icône. Paris, 2011, 5-12
- Louth, A. Modern Orthodox Thinkers: From the Philokalia to the Present . London, 2015, 319-321
- Epstein, M. The Phoenix of Philosophy: Russian Thought of the Late Soviet Period (1953–1991). New York, 2019, 211-221
- Benoit J.-N. Sergueï Averintsev - Une autre dissidence. Rennes, 2023

== See also ==
- Byzantine studies
