= Aleksei Losev =

Russian philosopher and philologist (1893–1988)

- Алексей Лосев
- Born: Aleksei Fyodorovich Losev; 22 September 1893; Novocherkassk, Don Host Oblast, Russian Empire
- Died: 24 May 1988 (aged 94); Moscow, Soviet Union

Philosophical work
- Era: Contemporary philosophy
- Region: Russian philosophy
- Institutions: Moscow University; University of Nizhni Novgorod; Moscow Conservatory; Moscow State Pedagogical University
- Notable students: Sergey Averintsev
- Main interests: Culturology

Aleksei Fyodorovich Losev (Russian: Алексе́й Фёдорович Ло́сев; 22 September 1893 – 24 May 1988) was a Soviet and Russian philosopher, philologist and culturologist, one of the most prominent figures in Russian philosophical and religious thought of the 20th century.

== Early life ==
Losev was born in Novocherkassk, the administrative center of the Don Host Oblast, the far western Russian territory held by the Don Cossacks on the banks of the Don River. He was named after his maternal grandfather, Aleksei Polyakov; a priest in the Russian Orthodox Church. Losev's paternal great-grandfather was also named Aleksei, and was awarded for heroism during the Napoleonic Wars, while fighting in a Cossack Brigade. Losev's father was Fyodor Petrovich Losev, a violinist and conductor by avocation and a teacher of mathematics and physics by trade. Attracted to a bohemian lifestyle, Losev's father left the family in the hands of his wife, Natalya Alekseyevna Loseva (née Polyakova), who raised Losev as an only child at her father's house.

Losev was schooled in the classics at gymnasium from the age of ten. He was little interested in his studies until he was introduced to philosophy. As well, he became fascinated by astronomy after reading a book by Camille Flammarion. His early interest in music continued, and he considered a career as a violinist.

In his final year of gymnasium, Losev received a gift from his professor: an eight-volume set of writings by Russian philosopher Vladimir Solovyov, which influenced him greatly. Losev entered Moscow University in 1911. He held season tickets to the Bolshoi Theatre where he watched every opera he could. During a study visit to Berlin, his luggage was stolen, including his books and all of his manuscripts. The trip was cut short by the start of World War I.

== Career ==
Losev graduated with a double degree—philology and philosophy—in 1915. He stayed at Moscow Imperial University to prepare for a position as lecturer in Classical Philology. In 1916 he published his first paper, "Eros in Plato". When Russia erupted in the 1917 February and October Revolutions, Losev kept a low profile, spending all of his time writing and studying. In 1919, typhus killed his mother. The same year, Losev's paper "Russian Philosophy" was published in a German-language volume composed of various articles about Russian cultural development. Losev was unaware of this publication until 1983. It was finally published in the Russian language after Losev's death.

After the revolution, the Bolsheviks stopped the teaching of the classics at Moscow University. In 1919, Losev became a professor of classical philology at the newly opened University of Nizhny Novgorod. He also found work teaching aesthetics at the State Institute of Musical Science, at the State Academy of Artistic Science, and at the Moscow Conservatory where he was named professor.

Losev married Valentina Mikhailovna Sokolova on 5 June 1922; she was a student of mathematics and astronomy who was five years younger than Losev. He had seen her since 1917 when he began renting a room from her parents in Moscow. Pavel Florensky, a former priest and physicist working on the official GOELRO plan to bring electrical utility service to Russia, performed the wedding ceremony in Sergiyev Posad. Losev and his wife found they were matched artistically, intellectually and also spiritually; they both sought higher understanding in the study of Russian religion under Archimandrite David. Religion was being suppressed by the Bolsheviks, so this study was conducted in secret. On 3 June 1929 the two were ordained monks in the Russian Orthodox Church in a private ceremony officiated by David. They took the monastic names Andronik and Afanasiya. The Losevs successfully hid their monastic status from the public until five years after Losev's death in 1988.

== Conflict with Communism ==
Losev wrote eight monograph volumes, beginning the work in 1923. The titles were: The Ancient Cosmos and Modern Science, The Philosophy of Name, The Dialectics of Artistic Form, The Dialectics of Number in Plotinus, Criticism of Platonism by Aristotle, Music as a Subject of Logic, Essays on Classical Symbolism and Mythology, and The Dialectics of Myth. The series was to conclude with a ninth volume but The Dialectics of Myth caused a great deal of controversy, and Losev never finished the final monograph.

In these works, Losev synthesized the ideas of Russian philosophy of the early 20th century, of Christian Neo-platonism, dialectics of Schelling and Hegel, and phenomenology of Husserl. In 1930's The Dialectics of Myth, Losev rejected dialectical materialism and proposed that myth (idea) should be treated on equal terms with physical matter.

The Dialectics of Myth identified as false the constructs of the Soviet system; it pointed out the absurdity of the myths associated with state ideology, and with "the dogma of Communism". Soviet officials reacted quickly to suppress the book. On 18 April 1930 Losev was arrested and held in solitary confinement in the basement prison of the Lubyanka Building. His wife Valentina was arrested on 5 June 1930; the couple's eighth wedding anniversary. Marianna Gerasimova, an investigator with the Joint State Political Directorate (OGPU), an agency of secret police, was assigned to investigate Losev with the goal of proving that he was a leader of the secret religious splinter group called Onomatodoxy, based on the idea that the Name of God is God Himself, and that Losev was involved in planning violence against the Soviet government. Losev was indeed associated with Onomatodoxy but his role was theological, not practical. Gerasimova led a team of investigators who gathered and fabricated evidence over the course of 17 months while Losev was held in prison. Gerasimova listed false claims against Losev such as his being a member of the Black Hundreds, an antisemite, and a religious bigot and fanatic. Losev's library and writings were seized, and his dwelling was lived in by an agent of OGPU.

In the summer of 1930, the 16th Communist Congress met, and Losev's case was discussed. The book was denounced by politician Lazar Kaganovich and playwright Vladimir Kirshon who said "for such nuances put him up against a wall" to be executed. All 500 copies of the book were seized and destroyed. After 4 months in Lubyanka, Losev was transferred to Butyrskaia Prison where he was held for 13 more months. The Losevs were sentenced for his "militant idealism": Valentina to five years and Aleksei to ten years of hard labor in Northern Russia. Losev was sent to Gulag labor camps to work on the construction of the White Sea–Baltic Canal. Initially, he was put to work hauling timber, but his health failed and he was assigned night watchman at a timber storage facility. There he began to gradually lose his vision due to malnutrition, though he was reunited with his wife in 1932 at Belbaltlag labor camp. In December 1931, Maxim Gorky wrote acidly in Pravda and in Izvestia that he regretted Losev was still alive to foul the Soviet air.

Despite this, it was Gorky's first wife who obtained Losev's release from the Gulag. Yekaterina Peshkova, formerly an activist with the Political Red Cross and, in the 1930s, the chair of the follow-on group Assistance to Political Prisoners, worked to free Losev, finally succeeding in late 1932 in overturning his conviction.

== Post-arrest career ==
After returning to Moscow in mid-1933, Losev was allowed to pursue his academic career and to teach. Ancient philosophy, myth and aesthetics became his "inner exile": he was able to express his own spiritualist beliefs.

Losev had been very admiring of the famous pianist Maria Yudina. He had met with her at his Moscow home in early April 1930, prior to a concert she performed on April 16. Soon afterward, Losev was arrested because of his book The Dialectics of Myth. When he returned home in 1933, he wrote a novel using Yudina as the model: Woman as Thinker, or The Woman Thinker. The flawed heroine Losev created, Maria Valentinovna Radina, was a woman musician who spouted high-minded philosophy but slipped to lower standards in her personal life. The novel has been criticized as an outlet for Losev's difficult relationship with Yudina, and as a poor example of his capabilities as a writer. Yudina disliked the character of Maria which she recognized as herself, and in early 1934 she broke with Losev, never to see him again.

During the 1930s, Losev composed what he intended to be a definitive work on classic aesthetics, titled A History of Ancient Aesthetics. The manuscript was lost along with everything else in his Moscow apartment when it was hit by a German bomb in 1941. In 1943, Losev was awarded a doctorate degree in the classics honoris causa: from the mass of work previously accomplished. From 1942 to 1944, Losev taught at Moscow University and from 1944 on at the Moscow State Pedagogical University. Also in 1944, the Losevs brought a young post-graduate student into their home—Aza Alibekovna Takho-Godi—who continued in her studies of classical philology. Both the Losevs grew fond of Takho-Godi; when Valentina died from cancer on 29 January 1954 it was with her blessing that Losev and Takho-Godi would join in marriage. Takho-Godi became Losev's second wife and eventually his widow.

Losev published some 30 monographs between the 1950s and 1970s. With regards to Western philosophy of the time, Losev criticized severely the structuralist thinking.

In the USSR, his works were censored while he was praised as one of the greatest philosophers of the time. He was even awarded the USSR State Prize in 1986 for his eight-volume History of Classical Aesthetics, two years before his death.

== Controversies ==
In 1996, a controversy arose when author Konstantin Polivanov, Jewish studies historian Leonid Katsis, and journalist Dmitrii Shusharin published three articles that described Losev as an antisemite who bargained with Joseph Stalin for his release from exile. According to translator Vladimir Leonidovich Marchenkov these three articles appearing in Russian newspaper Segodnya were a coordinated series of accusations. Katsis compared Losev's supposed relationship with Stalin to the relationship between Alfred Rosenberg and Adolf Hitler, with Rosenberg helping to shape Hitler's ideology. Olesya Nikolaeva responded to deny this assertion in the Russian Orthodox newspaper Radonezh: "The logic of the Bolshevist secret police" (1996). Losev's widow Aza Alibekovna Takho-Godi wrote a rebuttal of the claims in the magazine Russkaya mysl; to disprove the assertions she printed letters written by Losev to the state censors. The popular science magazine Rodina moved to settle the matter by publishing materials from the 1930–31 OGPU case file, which for the first time publicly demonstrated how Soviet secret police fabricated evidence against Losev.

Swiss Slavicist Felix Philipp Ingold followed with "Zerbrechende Mythen" ("Crumbling myths") in 1996, in support of the idea that Losev was antisemitic. Professor Alexander Haardt of Ruhr University Bochum responded to Ingold by defending Losev's reputation. Haardt said that Losev's legacy should not be smeared by a few words but judged by the whole of his life's work. He said the antisemitic statements listed in Gerasimova's politically motivated investigation from 1930 to 1931 could not be trusted as originating from Losev. Losev's defenders characterized him as a principled critic of all religions including Protestantism, Judaism, and his own orthodoxy, and said that he was never anti-Jew. He was also said to be in approval of Communist totalitarianism even while he freely criticized the emptiness of Communist ideology. Russian philosopher Leonid Stolovich wrote very strongly against those who called Losev an antisemite, the article titled "Losev should not be handed over as a gift to the Black Hundred followers!" He said that mitigating documents that should have been included in the OGPU investigation case files appeared to be missing, likely because they did not support the antisemitic conclusions. In 1999, Katsis re-examined the issue in light of the letters and files published in late 1996. He found the issue to be more nuanced than he previously thought, and agreed that "all attempts to distort" Losev's legacy were "politically motivated".

Losev also entered into the controversy raging within Eastern Orthodoxy over the nature of the Name of God, siding with and clearly articulating the Imiaslavie position which was at odds with the official stance taken by the Russian Orthodox Church.

== Works ==
- 1916 – "Eros in Plato" (Эрос у Платона)
- 1916 – "On the Musical Perception of Love and Nature"
- 1916 – "Two Perceptions of the World"
- 1919 – "Russian Philosophy"
- 1927 – The Ancient Cosmos and Contemporary Science (Античный космос и современная наука.)
- 1927 – The Philosophy of Name, regarding the ideas of Onomatodoxy
- 1927 – The Dialectics of the Artistic Form (Диалектика художественной формы.)
- 1927 – Music as a Subject of Logic
- 1928 – The Dialectics of Number in Plotinus, a translation and commentary about Plotinus' treatise On Numbers
- 1928 – Criticism of Platonism by Aristotle, a translation and commentary about Aristotle's Metaphysics
- 1929 – Essays on Classical Symbolism and Mythology
- 1930 – The Dialectics of Myth (translated by Vladimir Marchenkov). New York: Routledge, 2003, ISBN 0-415-28467-8.
- 1934 – Woman as Thinker, or The Woman Thinker, a novel inspired by pianist Maria Yudina
- 1937 – translation of Latin works by Nicholas of Cusa
- 1975 – translation of works by Sextus Empiricus, first written in 1937 but published in 1975
- 1978 – Aesthetics of the Renaissance (Эстетика Возрождения.)
- 1982 – Sign, Symbol, Myth (Знак, символ, миф.)
- 1983 – Vladimir Solovyov (Владимир Соловьев.)
- 1963–1988 – The History of Classical Aesthetics (История античной эстетики, 8 volumes.)
- 1990 – "Scriabin's Worldview", essay about pianist/composer Alexander Scriabin, written in 1919–21, first published in 1990.
- 1994 – "Twelve Theses on Antique Culture", a public lecture Losev delivered to the Scientific Committee of Culture of the Presidium of the USSR Academy of Science. First published in 1994 in Russian. Translated to English by Oleg Kreymer and Kate Wilkinson and published in Arion: A Journal of Humanities and the Classics, 2003, vol. 11, no. 1.
- Electronically available books by Losev (in Russian)
