= Intransigence =

White Movement anti-communist principle

Intransigence (Russian: непримири́мость) is an ideological and political principle that was formed within the framework of the White Movement in the early years of emigration.

== Intransigence concept ==
Intransigence is an anti–communist principle: refusal of any cooperation with the communist government in the territory of the former Russian Empire or representatives of this government abroad in any form.

The principle of "intransigence" was put forward by a number of ideologists of the Russian Emigration of the First Wave as a counter ideological platform opposed to "returnism", "smenovekhovism", "Soviet patriotism" and similar trends that called for cooperation with the communist regime under the pretext of its alleged "rebirth". To this Ivan Ilyin responded in particular:

We all live in time; in time we feel and act; we are exposed to various influences, get infected, get sick and die. In this general sense, everything "evolves"; and along with bacteria, poisonous insects and predatory animals, communists also "evolve". To assert such "evolution" means to utter a commonplace, a meaningless truism, a hackneyed and superficial remark, from which no practical conclusions can be drawn. Yes, bacteria "evolve"; does this mean that I should promote them? Poisonous insects also "evolve"; does this mean that they are harmless and useful? Predatory animals also "evolve"; why are we not in a hurry to imitate their rapacity?

The main promoters of "intransigence" abroad were the Russian Orthodox Church Abroad and the Russian All–Military Union. In the Soviet Union, the most prominent exponent of the idea of "intransigence" was the Catacomb Church.

== Intransigence as a socio–political position ==
Justifying the position of the irreconcilables, General Evgeniy Miller wrote:

... the Bolsheviks seduced all Russian workers and rural people with loud deceptive words "workers' and peasants' power", for the glory of which they brutally killed the Tsar–Martyr and His entire Family; "all the land goes to the peasants" and so on, playing on the basest instincts of human nature; moreover, they are doing everything to take the soul out of the Russian people and, having ruined them financially to the point of starvation and cannibalism, brought them morally to complete savagery, when man became a wolf to man.

A prominent figure in the White emigration, the last Chief Prosecutor of the Holy Governing Synod, Anton Kartashev later – after the end of the Second World War – summing up his article "Intransigence", gave the following definition of "intransigence":

Intransigence to the point of rigorism with all types and forms of Bolshevisanism is our spiritual hygiene, sanitation, sewage disposal. Bolshevism is not just a political party, a movement, it is a subtle spiritual phenomenon. This is corruption of conscience. The simplest disinfection, protecting oneself from putrefactive bacilli, dictates strict methods of intransigence.
Our new justification for this rigorism was brought to us by new emigration. Try to sing it a song about the evolution of the Kremlin, about Patriarch Alexy and so on, you will end up on the list of planted agents whom it mercilessly and with disgust uproots from its midst.
The conciliatory page in the history of Russian emigration has been slammed shut forever.

Ivan Ilyin wrote a lot about the ideas of intransigence, in particular, in articles in the collection "Our Tasks".

== Non–conciliators and collaborationism ==
One of the anti–communist logos

After the National Socialists came to power in Germany, and especially during the Second World War, the irreconcilable figures of the Russian emigration were divided into several groups in their attitude towards the ideas and practices of German National Socialism.

Some – in particular, such prominent representatives of the "non–conciliators" as Pyotr Krasnov, Andrey Shkuro, Anton Turkul – collaborated with Nazi Germany in various ways.

The other, the neutral part of the irreconcilable Russian emigration, a particularly prominent representative of which was General Voitsekhovsky, remaining in the position of "intransigence", refused to support the Nazis in their campaign against the Soviet Union. A well–known quote from Sergei Voitsekhovsky, expressed in response to an invitation to join the Germans:

I hate the Bolsheviks, but I won't fight against a Russian soldier!

Finally, the third part of the "non–conciliators" actively participated in the Second World War on the side of the Western allies of the Soviet Union. Their position was expressed after the war by the already mentioned Ivan Ilyin and Anton Kartashev, who, in particular, wrote:

A striking, downright grotesque illustration of moral baseness and animalistic petty egoism can be seen in the German attempt, under the flag of crushing communism, to, among other things, wipe out Russia and the Russian people from the face of the earth. Germany, the first in the world in terms of scholarly knowledge of Russia and in terms of everyday, neighbourly awareness, has shown such a degree of blindness, bordering on cretinism, that our older generations, who have learned much from the Germans and are accustomed to honour their scholarship, methodicality, thoroughness (Grundlichkeit), simply marvel: how did this "Volk der Denker" turn out to be such an incredible oaf in the "Russian question"? Instead of helping the waiting Russian people to free themselves from communist slavery, which any honest (and therefore intelligent) intervention can do, the Germans strengthened the anti–Christian power not only over the Russian peoples, but all over the world, and themselves deservedly and shamefully perished from it.

This last part included a significant number of people who, during the Second World War, switched from "non–conciliatory" positions to "Smenovekhovist" positions, accepted Soviet citizenship and left for the Soviet Union, where many became victims of repression.

According to modern research, a certain part of the Russian emigration after the Second World War "completely buried Russia" – they abandoned the idea of restoring the country due to the simple impossibility of doing this and – began to build their lives abroad outside the "Fatherland – Emigration" paradigm.

== Irreconcilable ideas after the collapse of the Soviet Union ==
After 1991, when the authorities of the Russian Federation unilaterally declared the policy of "Concord and Reconciliation" without supporting it with practical steps to eliminate the differences between the heirs of the White idea and the heirs of the Soviet Union, the principle of "irreconcilability" was the basis for the relations of some part of the supporters of the revival of historical Russia to the political regime established in the Russian Federation.

Supporters of this position celebrate November 7 as the Day of Intransigence.

== See also ==
- Smenovekhovstvo

== Sources ==
- Alexey Vovk. Soviet Russia and Me
- Anton Kartashev. Intransigence
- Ivan Ilyin. Our Tasks
- Evgeny Miller. Why Are We Irreconcilable?
