= Vekhovstvo =

Vekhovstvo (vekhovtsy) was a philosophical and socio–political trend in the Russian intellectual environment at the beginning of the 20th century that received its name from the programmatic collection Vekhi (1909). The initiator of the publication of Vekhi was Mikhail Gershenzon.

Among the authors of the collection were four former Marxists: Nikolai Berdyaev, Sergei Bulgakov, Peter Struve, and Semyon Frank, who took a position of Christian religiosity, rejecting Marxism as a purely economic doctrine that does not answer the fundamental questions of human existence.

The first collection of Vekhovist works was Problems of Idealism (1902), and the final one was From the Depths (1918).

== Ideas ==
The Vekhovtsy called on the intelligentsia, whom they blamed for the turmoil of 1905–1907, to renounce a worldview built on collectivism, people-worship (narodnichestvo), nihilism ("apostasy from the state"), irreligiosity, and the preaching of political radicalism. The positive program of Vekhovstvo is based on the recognition of the independence of the human subject and on the recognition of personal responsibility for what is happening on the basis of universal Christian values.

As we are, we not only cannot dream of merging with the people, but we must fear them more than all the punishments of the authorities and bless this authority, which alone with its bayonets and prisons still protects us from the fury of the people.

— Mikhail Gershenzon. Creative Self–Consciousness, Vekhi (1991)

=== Ideas of the main representatives ===
One of the leading members of Vekhi was the former Marxist Nikolai Berdyaev. He, like his associates, analyzed Russia's place in the changing world and its ideas, and searched for ways to develop the country. He called the era of the early 20th century the "New Middle Ages", since, in his opinion, humanity had once again entered the era of irrationalism, and the collectivist values that prevailed in society had once again suppressed the freedom of the individual. In addition, the philistine worldview of the West, according to Berdyaev, led to the destruction of higher values and the barbarization of society. He was also interested in the "Russian Idea", i.e., the essence of the Russian soul and the purpose of Russia. He argued that Russia combines the features of the West and the East, but he did not put it above other countries. Berdyaev claimed that, according to God's plan, the country should represent such a combination of Eastern and Western ideas that their unity and some kind of ideological integrity would be observed, but in reality the "Russian Idea" of that era was presented as a simple, chaotic mixture of the features of these two worlds.

Berdyaev subjected the worldview of the Russian person to a deep analysis, contrasting it with the Western one. If the European worldview was eventually able to achieve discipline, then the all–embracing "breadth" of the Russian soul was incapable of such restraint. Berdyaev found a manifestation of such a feature, for example, in the fact that within the framework of Russian thought it was quite possible to combine many opposites, an example of which could be revolutionaries who promoted radically conservative views. Thus, the Russian person is not characterized by a rigid categorization of certain concepts.

The philosopher and Orthodox priest Sergei Bulgakov held a strong anti–Western position. He criticized the Western ideology of Marxism, expressing, among other things, the idea that this teaching was only a translation of Jewish ideas into the plane of economic science. A socialist society, in his opinion, would promote progress only in the material sphere, without caring about the spiritual component. However, Bulgakov cannot be called a Slavophile in the full sense, since he also criticized Russian statehood for having too many Eastern features that had to be revised.

== Criticism ==
Vekhovstvo drew sharp criticism from the Bolshevik leader Vladimir Lenin, who branded the collection as an "encyclopedia of liberal apostasy" in December 1909: "Vekhi is a continuous stream of reactionary slop poured on democracy. It is clear that Novoye Vremya's publicists, Rozanov, Menshikov, and Alexander Stolypin, rushed to kiss Vekhi. It is clear that Anthony Volynsky was delighted with this work of the leaders of liberalism."
