= Desiderio Navarro =

Cuban art, culture and literature critic

Desiderio Navarro Pérez was a Cuban critic and theorist of literature, art and culture. His work was aimed at the exercise of criticism on scientific bases. Art theory, aesthetics, culturology and literary sciences are widely present in his works. He translated texts from these disciplines into Spanish from twenty languages.

== Career ==
Navarro was born on May 13, 1948, in Camagüey, and died in Havana on December 7, 2017. In the mid-1960s, he began publishing his first articles and studies in various Cuban and foreign magazines, focusing on literature, visual arts, aesthetics and cultural science.

Over time, his articles were published in magazines and newspapers across North and Latin America, and Europe. He served as a visiting professor at various universities and institutes worldwide and organized debates featuring international speakers. His books have been published in more than ten languages.

In 1972, he founded the journal Criterios. In 1994, he established the book series Criterios, and in 2011, he launched the e-zine Denken Pensée Thought Mysl., an information service on European cultural thought. In this leading magazine (cf. www.criterios.es), he brings together important essays from various languages on themes such as aesthetics, literature, art and culture. He also writes articles himself.

He has translated over 450 theoretical texts on literature, arts, culture and society from sixteen Romance, Germanic, Slavic and Uraloaltaic languages. These translations have been published in Cuba, Spain and Mexico.

In 2003, he founded the Center for Cultural Theory Criterios in Havana.

From the 2000s onward, Navarro played a central role in the critical reassessment of episodes of censorship and cultural repression in Cuba, particularly those associated with the so-called Grey Years. Following the public reappearance of former cultural official Luis Pavón Tamayo on Cuban television in 2007, which triggered widespread debate among intellectuals about the legacy of censorship during the Grey Years, Navarro became actively involved in these discussions and, through the Centro Teórico-Cultural Criterios, organized a series of conferences that brought together intellectuals and artists affected by cultural policies of the 1970s, including processes of “parametration” that led to the exclusion of numerous cultural figures; the proceedings were later published as La política cultural del período revolucionario: memoria y reflexión. This initiative contributed to making visible testimonies and debates that had long remained marginal to official discourse, addressing restrictive cultural policies and mechanisms of institutional exclusion that affected numerous creators in the 1970s and 1980s.

== Recognition ==
In 1996, Navarro received a Guggenheim Fellowship. Furthermore, he received a grant from the Prince Claus Fund from the Netherlands twice, in 1999 and 2005, in order to be able to continue his project Criterios.

Furthermore, he was honored with a number of awards, of which the following is a (translated) selection:

- 1985: Prize for Criticism of Visual Arts of Salón, (UNEAC, Union of Writers and Artists of Cuba)
- 1983 and 1988: National Prize of Literary Criticism Mirta Aguirre
- 1986 and 1991: Translation Prize for lifetime work (UNEAC)
- 1987: Critics National Prize, Ministry of Culture
- 1988: Award Reason to Be of the cultural center Alejo Carpentier
- 1989: Translation prize of the cultural center Juan Marinello
- 1989: Order of Cultural Merit, People's Republic of Poland
- 1995: Prize for the lifetime work in criticism, Argentine society for art critics
- 2003: Medal Alejo Carpentier of the State Council of Cuba
- 2006: National Editors' Prize of the Cuban Institute of the Book
- 2008 Distinction Polonicum, Center for Polish Culture and Language, Warsaw University
- 2009: Prince Claus Award, Prince Claus Fund, Netherlands

In recognition of his life's work, in 2022, the University of Sancti Spiritus Jose Marti Perez created the Desiderio Navarro Honorary Chair in order to carry out cultural research and study the work of this Cuban scientist.

== Works ==
Navarro wrote and published the following books:

- 1986: Cultura y marxismo: Problemas y polémicas
- 1989: Ejercicios del criterio
- 2007: Las causas de las cosas
- 2008: A pe(n)sar de todo

Navarro has edited 22 anthologies of which the following is a selection. Some works have been reprinted several times.

- 1975: Cultura, ideología y sociedad
- 1981: Anatoli Lunacharski. Sobre cultura, arte y literatura
- 1986: Textos y contextos, t. I y II
- 1994: Patrice Pavis. El teatro y su recepción. Semiología, cruce de culturas y postmodernismo
- 1996: Iuri Lotman. La semiosfera, t. I, II y III
- 1997: Intertextualité. Francia en el origen de un término y el desarrollo de un concepto
- 2002: Image 1: Teoría francesa y francófona del lenguaje visual y pictórico
- 2004: Intertextualität 1:, Alemania en la teoría de la intertextualidad
- 2006: Stefan Morawski. De la estética a la filosofía de la cultura
- 2007: El Postmoderno, el postmodernismo y su crítica en Criterios
- 2008: Borís Groys. Obra de arte total Stalin. Topología del arte
- 2009: El pensamiento cultural ruso en Criterios
- 2011: Henryk Markiewicz. Los estudios literarios: conceptos, problemas, dilemas
- 2011: Wolfgang Welsch. Actualidad de la estética. Estética de la actualidad
