= Glasnost =

1980s policy of the Soviet Union promoting openness and freedom of information

- Russian: гласность
- Romanization: glasnost'
- IPA: [ˈɡlasnəsʲtʲ]
- Literal meaning: publicity, transparency

Glasnost (/ˈɡlæznɒst/ GLAZ-nost; Russian: гласность, IPA: [ˈɡlasnəsʲtʲ]) is a concept relating to openness and transparency. It has several general and specific meanings, including a policy of maximum openness in the activities of state institutions and freedom of information and the inadmissibility of hushing up problems. In Russian, the word glasnost has long been used to mean 'openness' and 'transparency'. In the mid-1980s, it was popularised by Mikhail Gorbachev as a political slogan for increased government transparency in the Soviet Union within the framework of perestroika, and the word came to be used in English in the latter meaning.

== Historical usage ==
In the Russian Empire of the late-19th century, the term was used in its direct meanings of "openness" and "publicity" and applied to politics and the judicial system. Some reforms were introduced permitting attendance of the press and the public at trials. After some liberalization under Alexander II of Russia, the openness of trials started to be restricted again. Human rights activist Lyudmila Alexeyeva writes that the word glasnost has been in the Russian language for several hundred years as a common term: "It was in the dictionaries and lawbooks as long as there had been dictionaries and lawbooks. It was an ordinary, hardworking, non-descript word that was used to refer to a process, any process of justice or governance, being conducted in the open." In the mid-1960s it acquired a revived topical importance in discourse about the necessity of changing the Cold War era internal policy of the Soviet Union.

== In the USSR ==
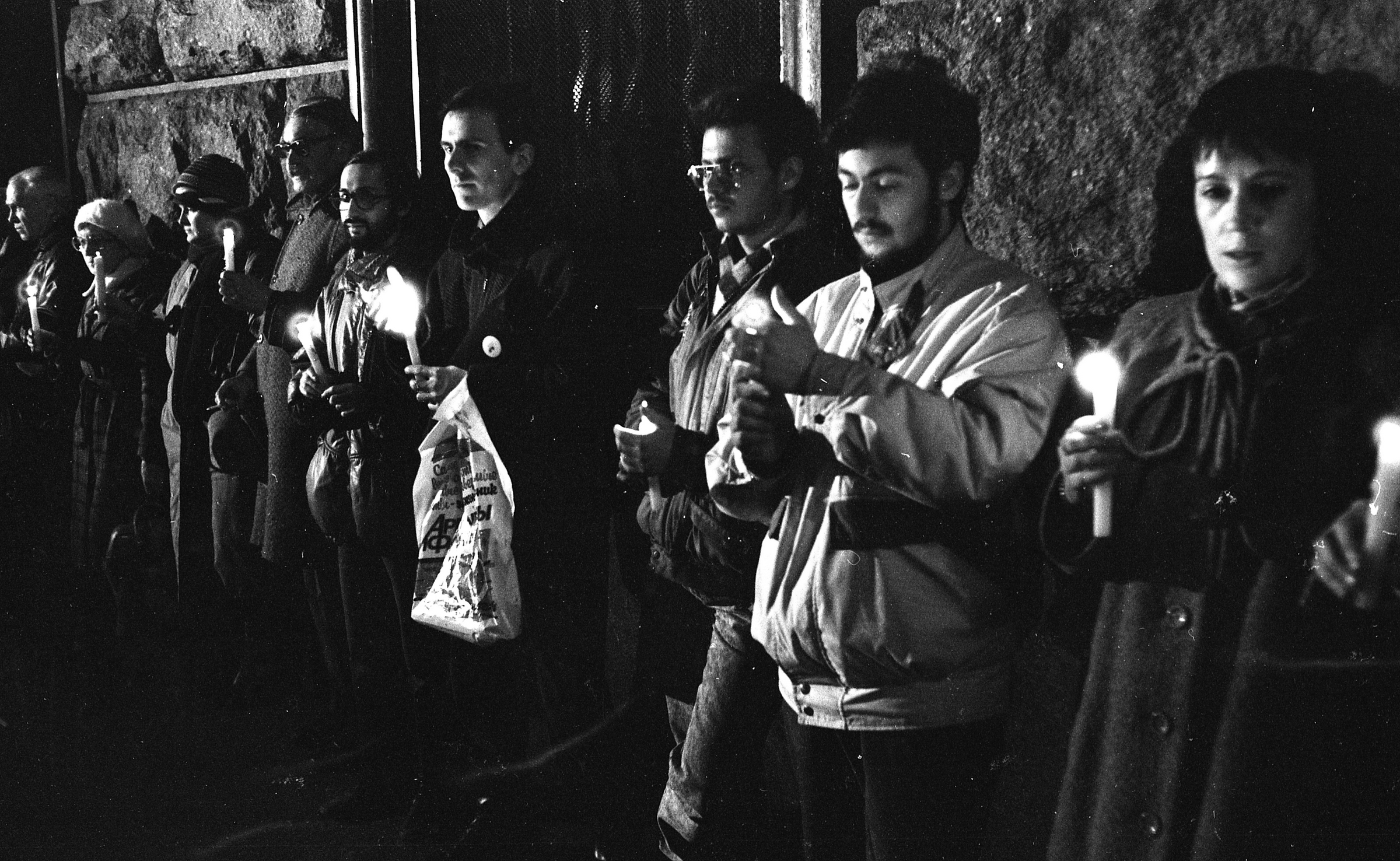
The rally near the KGB building in Moscow on Lubyanka Square in memory of Stalin's victims on the Day of Political Prisoners, 30 October 1989

=== The dissidents ===
On 5 December 1965 the Glasnost rally took place in Moscow, considered to be a key event in the emergence of the Soviet civil rights movement. Protesters at Pushkin Square led by Alexander Yesenin-Volpin demanded access to the closed trial of Yuly Daniel and Andrei Sinyavsky. The protestors made specific requests for "glasnost", herein referring to the specific admission of the public, independent observers and foreign journalists, to the trial that had been legislated in the then newly issued Russian SFSR Code of Criminal Procedure. Article 111 of the Code stated that, with a few specified exceptions, judicial hearings in the USSR should be held in public.

Such protests against closed trials continued throughout the post-Stalin era. Andrei Sakharov, for example, did not travel to Oslo to receive his Nobel Peace Prize due to his public protest outside a Vilnius court building demanding access to the 1976 trial of Sergei Kovalev, an editor of the Chronicle of Current Events and prominent rights activist.

=== Gorbachev ===
On December 10, 1984, while poised to become the next Soviet General Secretary, Mikhail Gorbachev made a speech detailing the need for glasnost, alongside other reforms such as perestroika, and next year, becoming General Secretary, he launched the glasnost campaign. Alexander Yakovlev, Head of the Propaganda Department of the Communist Party of the Soviet Union, is considered to be the intellectual force behind Gorbachev's reform program.

Glasnost was taken to mean increased openness and transparency in government institutions and activities in the Soviet Union (USSR). Glasnost reflected a commitment of the Gorbachev administration to allowing Soviet citizens to discuss publicly the problems of their system and potential solutions. Gorbachev encouraged popular scrutiny and criticism of leaders, as well as a certain level of exposure by the mass media.

Some critics, especially among legal reformers and dissidents, regarded the Soviet authorities' new slogans as vague and limited alternatives to more basic liberties. Alexei Simonov, president of the Glasnost Defence Foundation, makes a critical definition of the term in suggesting it was "a tortoise crawling towards Freedom of Speech".

Between 1985 and 1991, during an era of reforms in the USSR, glasnost was frequently linked with other generalised concepts such as perestroika (literally: restructuring or regrouping) and demokratizatsiya (democratisation). Gorbachev often appealed to glasnost when promoting policies aimed at reducing corruption at the top of the Communist Party and the Soviet government, and moderating the abuse of administrative power in the Central Committee. The ambiguity of "glasnost" defines the distinctive six-year period (1985–1991) at the end of the USSR's existence. There was decreasing pre-publication and pre-broadcast censorship and greater freedom of information.

The "Era of Glasnost" saw greater contact between Soviet citizens and the Western world, particularly the United States: restrictions on travel were loosened for many Soviet citizens which further eased pressures on international exchange between the Soviet Union and the West.

While associated with freedom of speech, the main goal of this policy was to make the country's management transparent, and circumvent the holding of near-complete control of the economy and bureaucracy of the Soviet Union by a concentrated body of officials and bureaucratic personnel.

During Glasnost, Soviet history under Stalin was re-examined; censored literature in the libraries was made more widely available; and there was a greater freedom of speech for citizens and openness in the media. It was in the late 1980s when most people in the Soviet Union began to learn about the atrocities of Stalin, and learned about previously suppressed events.

== Outside the Soviet Union ==
Gorbachev's policy of glasnost received mixed reception in communist states, especially outside the Eastern Bloc.

=== Support ===
Glasnost had a trickle-down effect on Eastern Europe and led to democratic reforms, namely in Poland and Czech Republic. Glasnost and similar reforms were applied in the following communist states:

- Bulgaria
- Czechoslovakia
- East Germany
- Hungary
- Mongolia
- Poland
- Vietnam (see đổi mới)

Furthermore, in the socialist state of Yugoslavia, similar reforms also existed, with the first major reforms beginning in Slovenia.

=== Opposition ===
Glasnost or similar reforms were not applied in the following communist states:

- China
  - In the 1980s, political reforms were discussed, with some reforms being established in the 1982 Constitution. Political reform ceased following the 1989 Tiananmen Square protests and massacre, but strong non-Soviet-inspired liberal economic reforms took place including the Four Modernizations and Reform and Opening Up.
- Cuba
  - Cuban officials rejected perestroika and glasnost, and instead pursued conservative economic reforms as part of the Rectification movement, which involved ending existing free market reforms, tightening nationalization, and promotion of Che Guevara as a moral example.
- Laos
- North Korea
- Romania
  - Reforms were opposed by Nicolae Ceaușescu.

== See also ==
- 1965 Glasnost rally
- Derzhavnost
- Demokratizatsiya (Gorbachev's "Democratization")
- Glasnost Bowl
- Perestroika (Gorbachev's "Restructuring")
- Uskoreniye (Gorbachev's "Acceleration")
- Common knowledge (logic)
- Mutual knowledge
- Pluralistic ignorance
