= Grey years =

Period of stagnation in Cuban cultural history

- 1971 – 1976 (debated)
Revolutionary Offensive	El Diálogo
- Location: Cuba
- Including: Institutionalization process
- President: Fidel Castro
- Key events: Padilla affair

The grey years were a loosely defined period in Cuban history, generally agreed to have started with the Padilla affair in 1971. It is often associated with the tenure of Luis Pavón Tamayo (de) as the head of Cuba's National Cultural Council ("Consejo Nacional de Cuba", or CNC) from 1971 to 1976. The period is also sometimes called the quinquenio gris ("five grey years"), the trinquenio amargo ("bitter fifteen years"), or the decada negra ("the black decade").

The grey years were generally defined by cultural censorship, harassment of intellectuals and artists, and the ostracization of members of the LGBT+ community. Greater monetary influence from the Soviet Union during this time period pressured Cuba into adopting a model of cultural repression that was reflected in Cuba's domestic policy throughout the 1970s.

== Background ==
Researchers generally agree on a timeline of events leading up to the grey years following the end of the Cuban Revolution in 1959. Immediately after the revolution, Cuba enjoyed some years of free-flowing creativity which was brought to an abrupt end in 1961 with the P.M. affair, when the nation's government censored a film depicting Cuban youth in Havana. Subsequently, Fidel Castro delivered his speech Palabras a los intelectuales ("Words to the Intellectuals") in June of the same year which included the famous line, "Dentro de la Revolución, todo; contra la Revolución, nada" ("Within the Revolution, everything; against the Revolution, nothing"). This signaled to intellectuals that there were clear limitations to their actions and that their freedoms were "subordinated to political power".

After being confronted with the United States embargo and blockade that essentially cut the island nation off from the capitalist world, Cuba became heavily reliant on the Soviet Union for goods. By 1968, Cuba was well on its way to becoming completely dependent on the USSR. The year was marked by Fidel Castro's support juxtaposed with Western criticism of the Warsaw Pact invasion of Czechoslovakia, the total nationalization of all property and censorship of cultural actors in the "Revolutionary Offensive", and the 1968 Cultural Congress in Havana which held debates on whether or not Cuban culture should be independent from political ideologies.

In 1970, Cuba set an ambitious goal for sugar production in an attempt to alleviate their economic struggles. Castro aimed for the manufacturing of ten million tons of raw sugar, more than twice the average harvest during that time. Ultimately, the harvest failed to reach its goal. With worldwide contempt growing against Cuba, the nation decided to join COMECON (the Soviet "common market") as a full member and sign a new sugarcane contract with the Soviet Union. This did allow sugar production to steadily increase in Cuba, but also led to a greater reliance on the USSR and paved the way for the mimicry of their censorship policies throughout the decade.

== Development ==
=== Origins ===
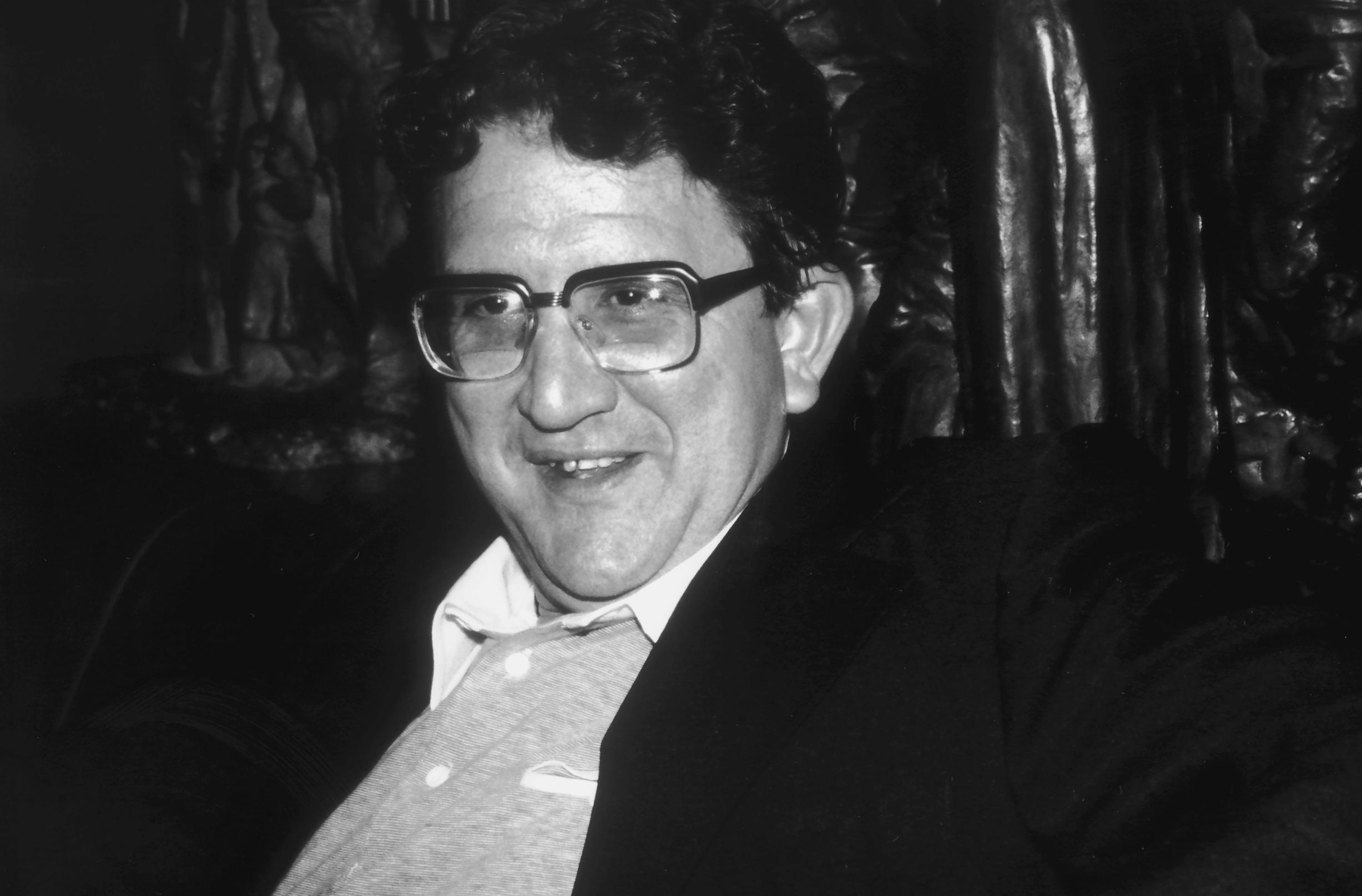
Herberto Padilla (1981).

The true catalyst of the grey years is widely regarded to be the Padilla affair of 1971. Heberto Padilla was a well-known Cuban poet and author who had sparked controversy with his book of poems Fuera del juego ("Outside of the Game"), which had been awarded the first place prize in the 1968 Cuban Union of Writers and Artists ("Unión Nacional de Escritores y Artistas de Cuba", or UNEAC) poetry contest. The Cuban government found the book's critical remarks to be counter-revolutionary at the time and attempted to dissuade the judges from acknowledging the book, but it was awarded and published nevertheless. Soviet pro-censorship rhetoric strengthened in Cuba over the next two years and consequently, Padilla was arrested in his home under the charge of "misrepresenting the revolution to foreign journalists and intellectuals" in 1971. His arrest sparked international outrage, especially amongst intellectuals, and in 1980 he was granted permission to leave Cuba for the United States where he resided until his death in 2000.

Following the affair, the CNC was reorganized and headed by Luis Pavón Tamayo, who many Cubans consider directly responsible for the grey years. Many intellectuals felt that under Pavón's repressive policies, Cuba shifted from a cultural policy based on discussion and tolerance into one that was enforced via edict. This may be partially due to Cuba's movement away from Marxist progressive nationalism into a more Soviet-oriented Marxism-Leninism approach that centralized power for the Communist Party of Cuba and was cemented into the 1976 version of Cuba's Constitution. The CNC's actions taken against artists who were thought to be counter-revolutionary were mixed; some were barred from spaces where they could create, some were disallowed from exhibiting their work, and some were forbidden from international travel. One of Pavón's victims, Cuban poet and playwright Antón Arrufat, was forced to perform manual labor in a library basement and banned from writing or publishing for over a decade. In Fidel Castro's April 30, 1971 closing speech at the first National Congress of Education and Culture, he criticized pseudo-leftists, "intellectual rats," and homosexuals. The CNC went on to enact policies that targeted and censored "high-risk" arts, specifically those in theatre. Artists who were not trusted ideologically or considered homosexuals were marginalized.

Afro-Cuban culture was also amongst the many movements considered "ideological diversionism", a term used by the Castro government throughout the grey years to describe counter-revolutionary expressions. The First National Congress of Culture and Education in 1971 reported that societies of and for Afro-Cuban individuals were no longer acceptable in Cuba. In addition, the widely popular African-based religions of Santería and Palo Monte were censored by the government on a large scale for the duration of the 1970s. This repression of Afro-Cuban culture and accompanying lack of representation in the public sphere throughout the grey years is generally thought to have contributed to a decline in Cuban social equality; during this time period, speaking out on issues of race was a form of diversionism.

=== Conclusion ===
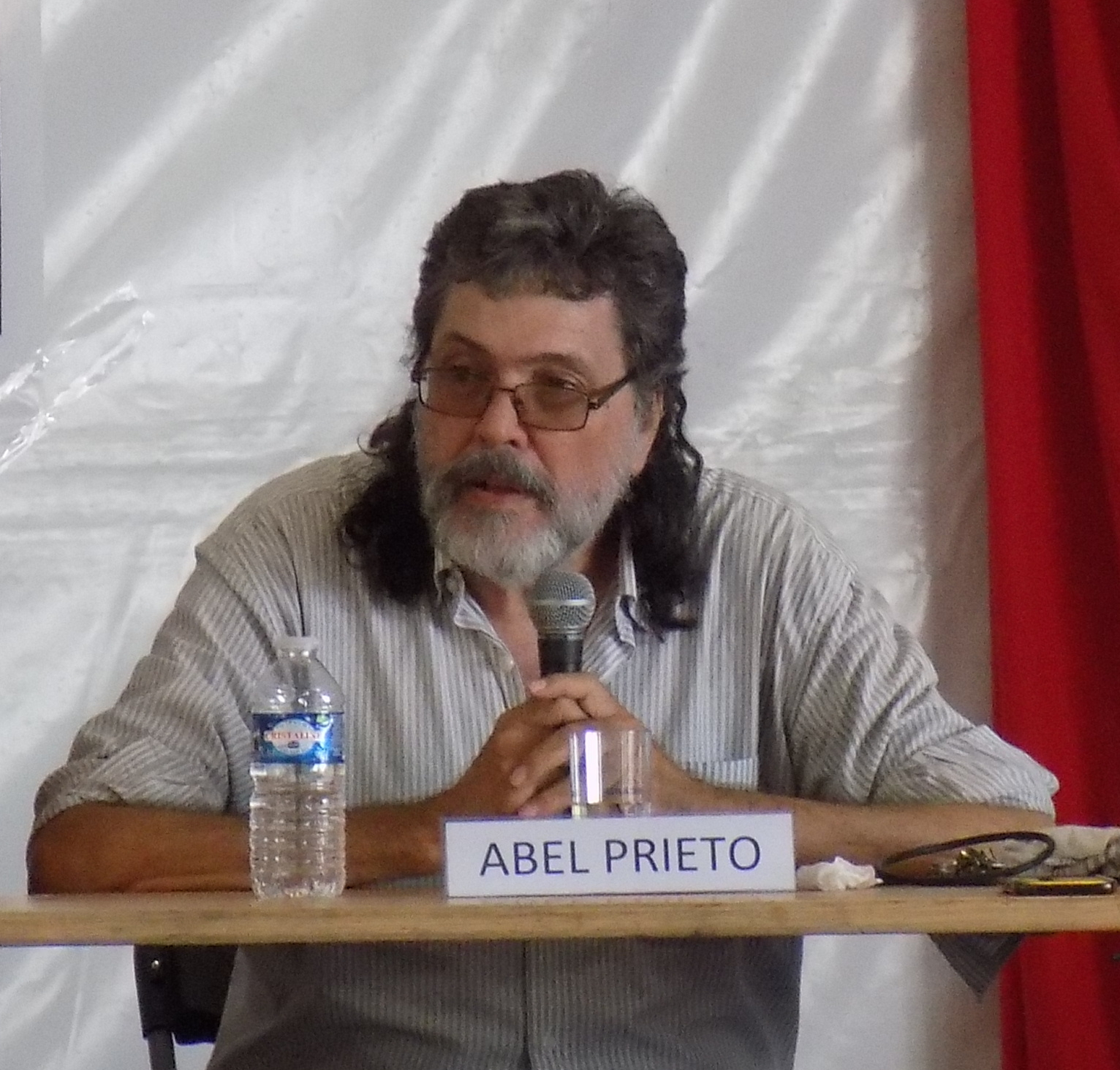
Abel Prieto (2019).

The grey years began to taper off with the foundation of the Ministry of Culture in 1976, with Armando Hart as Minister; however, the situation most drastically improved when writer Abel Prieto replaced him in 1997.

By the 1980s, the negative consequences of Cuba's "Sovietized" domestic policy became evident: economic failure, high levels of corruption, excessive bureaucratization, and the growing demoralization of the Cuban people. The resulting movement of the Cuban government away from this approach, along with Hart's position as Minister of Culture, sparked a "rectification" process of correcting previous mistakes. These amends included tempering off the repressive policies of the grey years and allowed for a cultural revival during this time. In 1986, Fidel Castro made a speech acknowledging that Cuba had been veering away from the original stated purpose of the 1959 Revolution and into something "worse than capitalism" for several years leading up to that point. The subsequent "Special Period" in Cuban history which took place from 1990 to 2003 attempted to remedy this situation by way of several major institutional changes, such as sweeping renovations to the Cuban legal, political, economic, and civil systems.

The fall of the USSR in 1991 also greatly contributed to ending the repressive policies that characterized the grey years. With Soviet Russia gone, Cuba found itself in an extremely vulnerable financial position; the country experienced a dramatic dip in sugar production that devastated its economy throughout the 1990s. The general consensus among scholars is that the Cuban government was too focused on economic survival during this period to concern itself with censoring intellectuals.

These events, along with the advent of the internet and the accompanying force of globalization, led to a cautious post-Soviet recovery of artistic autonomy throughout the country.

== Legacy ==
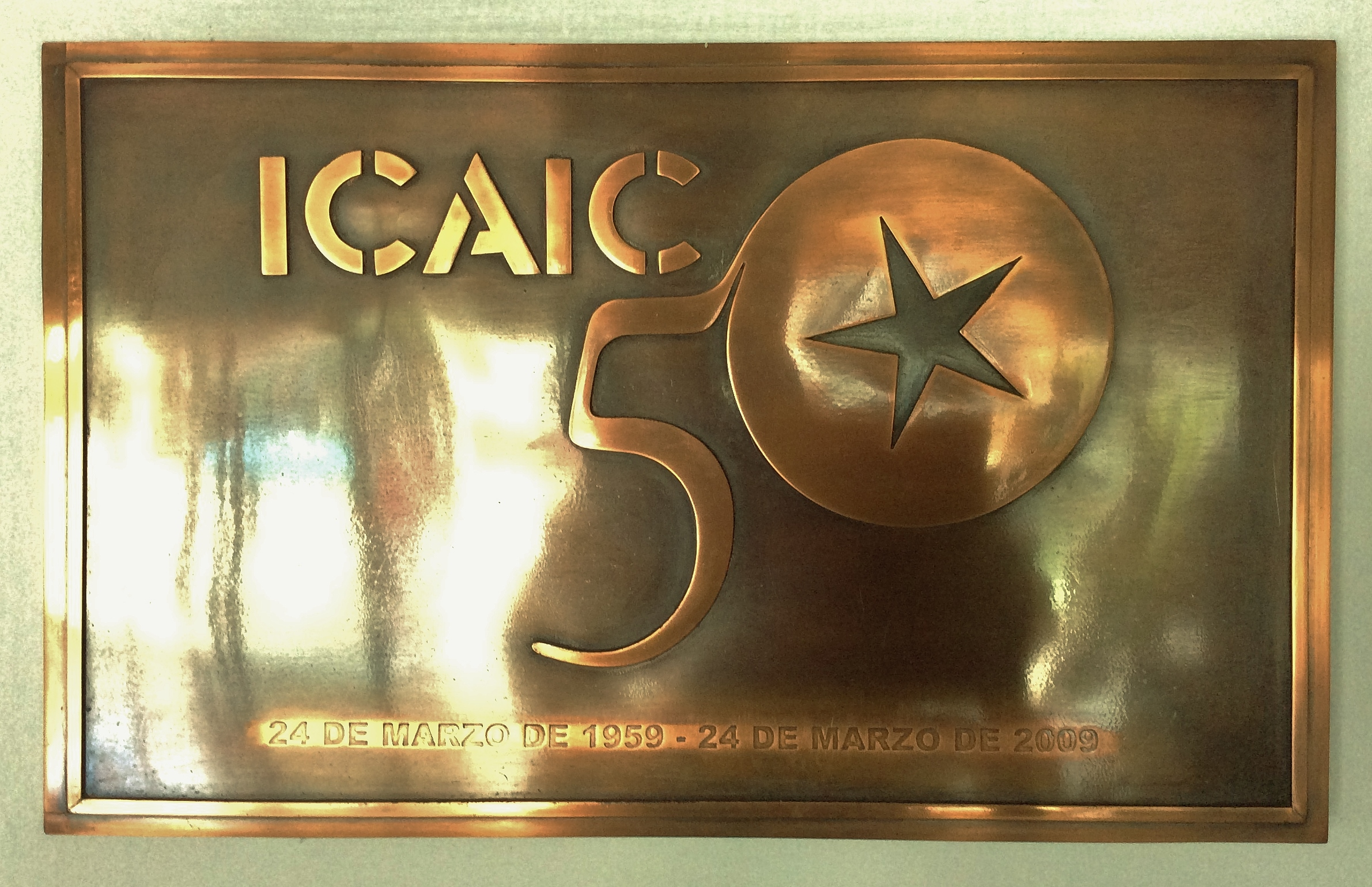
Instituto Cubano de Arte e Industria Cinematográficos (ICAIC) logo (2009).

Despite the decline of cultural repression in the late 1970s, censorship in Cuba still existed well into the 1980s and 90s. This is illustrated by the 1989 movie Alicia en el pueblo de Maravillas ("Alice in Wondertown"), a comedy that parodied the Cuban government's bureaucracy, inefficiency, and corruption. In the context of the dissolution of the Soviet Bloc and the government's desire to crack down on "ideological diversionism" in an attempt to avoid the same fate, the movie was banned after its award winning debut at the Berlin International Film Festival. Shortly thereafter, the Cuban Film Institute ("Instituto Cubano de Arte e Industria Cinematográficos", or ICAIC) was put on notice that it would be merging with the film and television of the military as a result of the economic crisis of the 1990s. This was seen as a potential "death blow" to the newly-recovered independence of the Cuban film industry, but after intense protests by the Cuban people, the government yielded and reinstated the ICAIC. However, this was not without compromise; the former head of the Institute, Julio García Espinosa, was replaced by Castro ally Alfredo Guevara.

In 2000, on the heels of neoliberal globalization, the Cuban government began to undertake major policy changes in its social sector which it refers to as the "Battle of Ideas", or the "batalla de ideas". The goal of this program was to open cultural opportunities in Cuba and address deepening social inequalities in order to boost the morale of its citizens and push back against American capitalist ideology. The key features of the "Battle of Ideas" included a weighty overhaul of the school system and a renaissance in the production, creation, and dissemination of cultural products with a heavy emphasis on patriotism and internationalism.

In January 2007, an elderly Luis Pavón Tamayo appeared beside Raúl Castro on a Cuban television program in an interview about his life, which painted his career overall in a positive light and did not acknowledge his role in the grey years. This widely appalled Cubans and ignited a nation-wide fear that the government was taking a renewed hard stance on censorship. In what became known as the "email war" (or the "guerra de los emails"), a chain of email correspondences regarding the scandal was set off by prominent writer Jorge Ángel Pérez and quickly drew national attention. The UNEAC subsequently issued a statement on the front page of Cuba's national newspaper, Granma, assuring Cubans that national policy would not be altered.

== See also ==
- Culture of Cuba
- Cuba under Fidel Castro
- Cuba–Soviet Union relations
- LGBT rights in Cuba
