= Russian Idea =

Political and religious concept on Russian identity

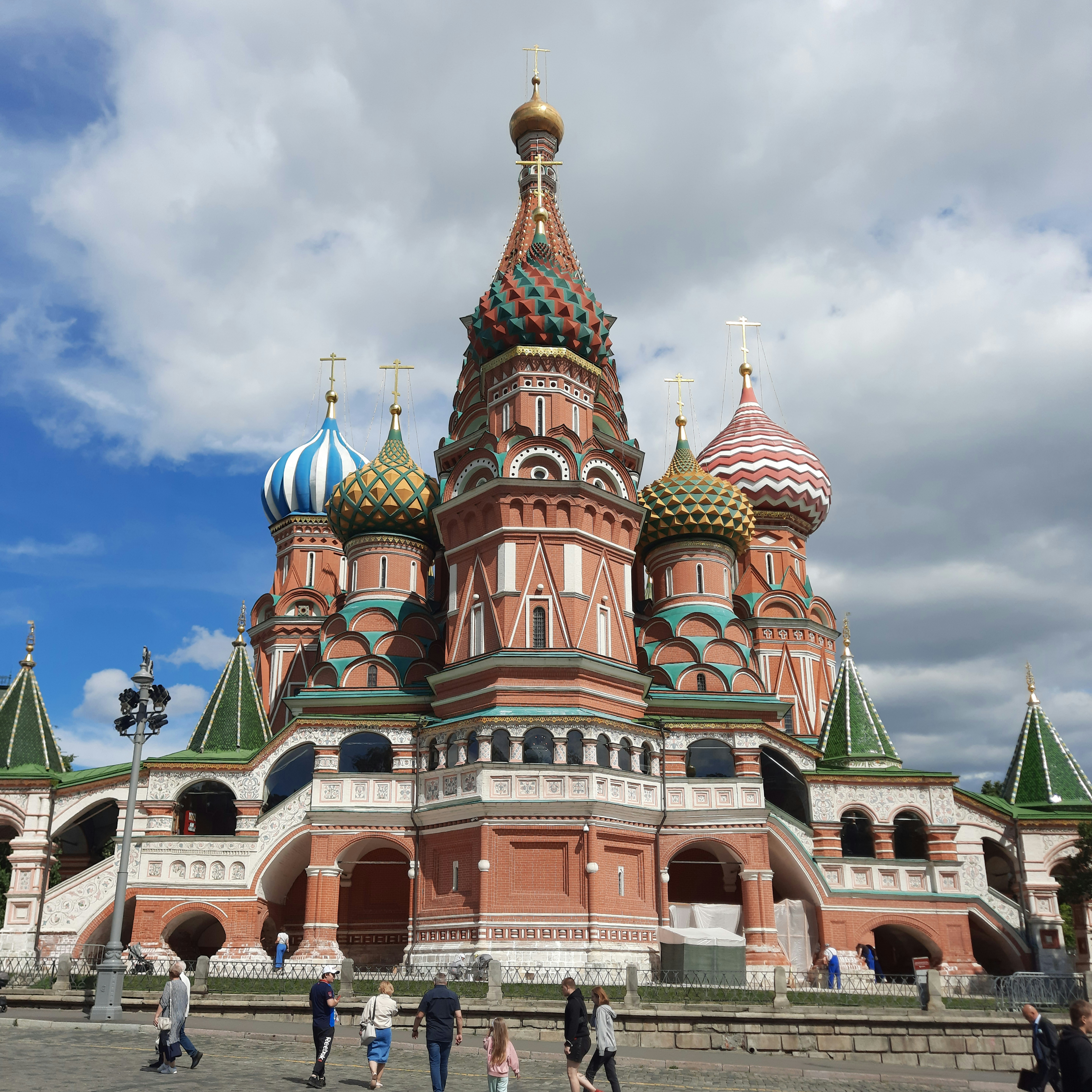
Saint Basil's Cathedral, an iconic piece of Russian Renaissance architecture is often used as a symbol of the country.

The "Russian Idea" (Russian: русская идея, romanized: russkaya ideya) is a set of concepts expressing the historical uniqueness, special vocation and global purpose of the Russian people and, by extension, of the Russian state. The Russian Idea acquired a distinct relevance after the dissolution of the Soviet Union and the spiritual vacuum that followed the event.

Russian philosopher Arseny Gulyga wrote in 2003: "Today the Russian Idea first of all sounds like a call for a national rebirth and preserving this material and spiritual rebirth of Russia. The Russian Idea is as relevant today as ever, for humanity (and not only Russia) has come to the edge of an abyss. [...] The Russian Idea is part of the all-human Christian idea arranged in terms of modern dialectics".

== History ==
It is supposed that the Russian Idea formed in the 16th century and was expressed in the idea of Orthodox Christian monarchy (the idea of Moscow being the Third Rome by Philotheus of Pskov). At the same time the source of the Russian Idea is supposed to have originated in the Jewish messianism.

The question of Russia's uniqueness and the vocation of the Russian people and state was first put forth by philosopher Pyotr Chaadayev, however he did not give this question a positive answer. Slavophiles suggested to Chaadayev their own versions of an answer (with criticism of Westernisation and an apology of Orthodox Christianity). The very term "Russian Idea" was introduced by Fyodor Dostoevsky in the year 1860 and became known abroad after the report named "L'Idée russe" given by philosopher Vladimir Solovyov in Paris in 1888. Russian philosopher Arseny Gulyga wrote: "Dostoevsky's version of the Russian Idea is a concept of universal morality having a patriotic form.

The term was widely used by Russian philosophers such as Evgenii Nikolaevitch Troubetzkoy, Vasily Rozanov, Vyacheslav Ivanovich Ivanov, Semyon Frank, Georgy Fedotov, Lev Platonovich Karsavin. In its most correct form, the "Russian Idea" concept is defined through ideas of philosophers and thinkers of the turn of the 20th century, such as Nikolai Berdyaev, Vladimir Solovyov, Ivan Ilyin, Nikolay Danilevsky, and also modern thinkers like Victor Vladimirovich Aksyutich, Arseny Gulaga and Aleksandr Solzhenitsyn. Their works emphasise the importance of this concept, its "cementing" quality for the Russian people. Modern Russian writer Victor Pelevin has his own view of the idea, and in its fullest form this view is detailed in his novel Generation "П".

According to the adherents of the concept, the Russian Idea expresses "God's plan for Russia", i.e. a sacred and, often, eschatological mission of the Russian people and state. (Note: According to the current Constitution of the Russian Federation, the Russian Federation is a secular state with separation of church and state: Article 14: 1. The Russian Federation is a secular state. No religion may be established as a state or obligatory one.; 2. Religious associations shall be separated from the State and shall be equal before the law.) The Russian Idea contains inside it the idea of the Russian people and state being a "God-carrier". The universality and sobornost of the Russian Idea is emphasised by this fact. The adherents of the Russian Idea strongly believe that Russia has a global purpose and is important for the overall Christian salvation.

== Criticism ==
=== Geopolitical aspect ===
Some thinkers (Aleksandr Lvovich Yanov, 1988) believe that behind the Russian Idea there are hidden geopolitical ambitions, together with the ideology of the Russian great-power chauvinism and imperialism. In opposition to the viewpoints similar to that of Yanov and of an article from Kommunist, Arseny Gulyga wrote that it was no wonder that the views of the anticommunist and the postcommunist coincide, because "in both cases there is a desire to defame the spiritual history of Russia".

=== Relationship between state and society ===
There is an opinion that the main contradiction between the Russian Idea and the West lies in the domain of relationships between society and state. While in the West a historically presented, principle has been "state for people”, the Russian principle is “people united, living and sacrificing for the bigger good”. Some remark that the sacred status of the state was a characteristic feature of both the Soviet and the Imperial period of the Russian history.

== See also ==
- Derzhavnost
- American Dream – National ethos of the United States
- American exceptionalism – Idea of the United States as unique nation
- Ethnocentrism – Judging another culture by the values and standards of one's own culture
- Eurocentrism – Worldview centred on or biased towards Western civilization
- Manifest destiny – 19th-century expansionist belief in the U.S.

== Bibliography ==
- Berdyaev, Nikolai Alexandrovich The Russian Idea (1948, originally published in Russian in 1946)
- Gulyga, Arseny Vladimirovich (2003). "Глава 4. «Я видел истину» (Достоевский)". Русская идея и ее творцы (in Russian). М.: Эксмо. pp. 106–107. ISBN 5-699-02718-1.
- Tsygankov, Andrei Pavlovich (2023). The "Russian Idea" in International Relations: Civilization and National Distinctiveness.
