= Institutionalization process =

- 1976–1986
Revolutionary Offensive	Rectification process
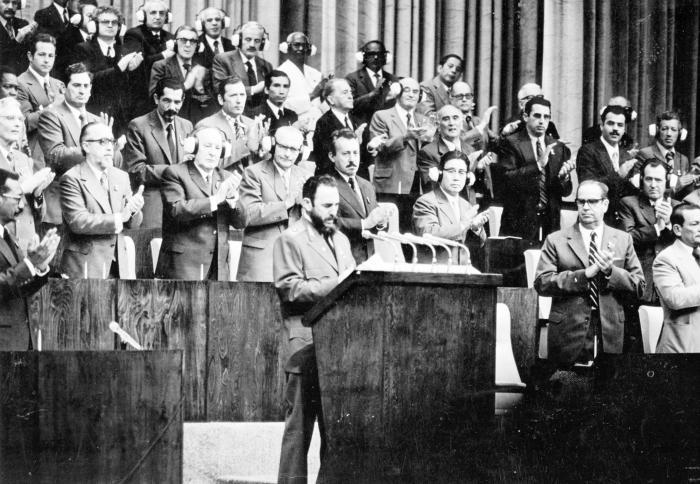
- Fidel Castro at the first congress of the Communist Party of Cuba.
- Location: Cuba
- Including: Grey years
- Leader: Fidel Castro
- Key events: 1976 Cuban constitutional referendum

The institutionalization process, sometimes more formally referred to as the "process of institutionalization", or the "institutionalization of the Cuban Revolution", was a series of political reforms, typically identified by historians as to have taken place between 1976 and 1985, although sometimes identified as having begun in 1970. This process was proceeded by a period of government that was directly managed by Fidel Castro without much input from other officials, which had been status-quo since the conclusion of the Cuban Revolution. The institutionalization process was also proceeded by a deepening of Cuba-Soviet relations in the early 1970s, which had soured before in the 1960s.

Institutionalization was kickstarted by the first official congress of the Communist Party of Cuba in December 1975. The meeting approved the development of a "System of Direction for Economic Planning" (SDPE), which was modeled on soviet economic planning and prioritized profit making. The implementation of the SDPE took ten years. In 1976, a new constitution was also approved. The constitution was modeled off the Soviet system, and introduced the National Assembly of People's Power as the institution of indirect representation in government.

Scholars Emily J. Kirk, Anna Clayfield, Isabel Story, have commented that the "institutionalization" periodization is hazy. While the adoption of a new constitution in 1976 is considered a hallmark of the "institutionalization" phase, there is no universally accepted date range as to when the "institutionalization" phase truly began, and when it truly ended. What is clear is that the "institutionalization" phase was generally concluded to have ended by the Rectification process in 1986.

== Background ==
=== Provisional government of Cuba ===
After the Triumph of the Revolution, Castro held de facto veto power during the process of establishing a provisional government. This de facto power came from his position as commander-in-chief of the rebel army. Political positions in the first two years after the Cuban Revolution were extremely fluid, and poorly defined in legal terms. It was often loyalty that was the determining factor in being appointed to a government position.

On April 9, 1959, Fidel Castro announced that elections would be delayed for fifteen months, utilizing the legitimizing slogan: "revolution first, elections later". On May Day of 1960, Fidel Castro cancelled all future elections, under the guise that citizens legitimized his rule by defending his government, thus elections were unnecessary. In July 1961, Castro officially merged the 26th of July Movement, the Popular Socialist Party, and a smaller third party, to form one group called the Integrated Revolutionary Organizations. In December 1961, Castro declared that he was personally a Marxist–Leninist.

=== Relations with the Soviet Union ===
By the mid-1960s, Cuba's relationship with the Soviet Union became increasingly strained. Castro refused to sign the Treaty on the Non-Proliferation of Nuclear Weapons, declaring it a Soviet-US attempt to dominate the Third World. Diverting from Soviet doctrine, Castro suggested that Cuba could evolve straight to pure communism rather than gradually progress through various stages of socialism. In turn, the Soviet-loyalist Aníbal Escalante began organizing a government network of opposition to Castro, though in January 1968, he and his supporters were arrested for allegedly passing state secrets to Moscow. Recognising Cuba's economic dependence on the Soviets, Castro relented to Brezhnev's pressure to be obedient, and in August 1968 he denounced the leaders of the Prague Spring and praised the Warsaw Pact invasion of Czechoslovakia.

=== Economy of Cuba ===
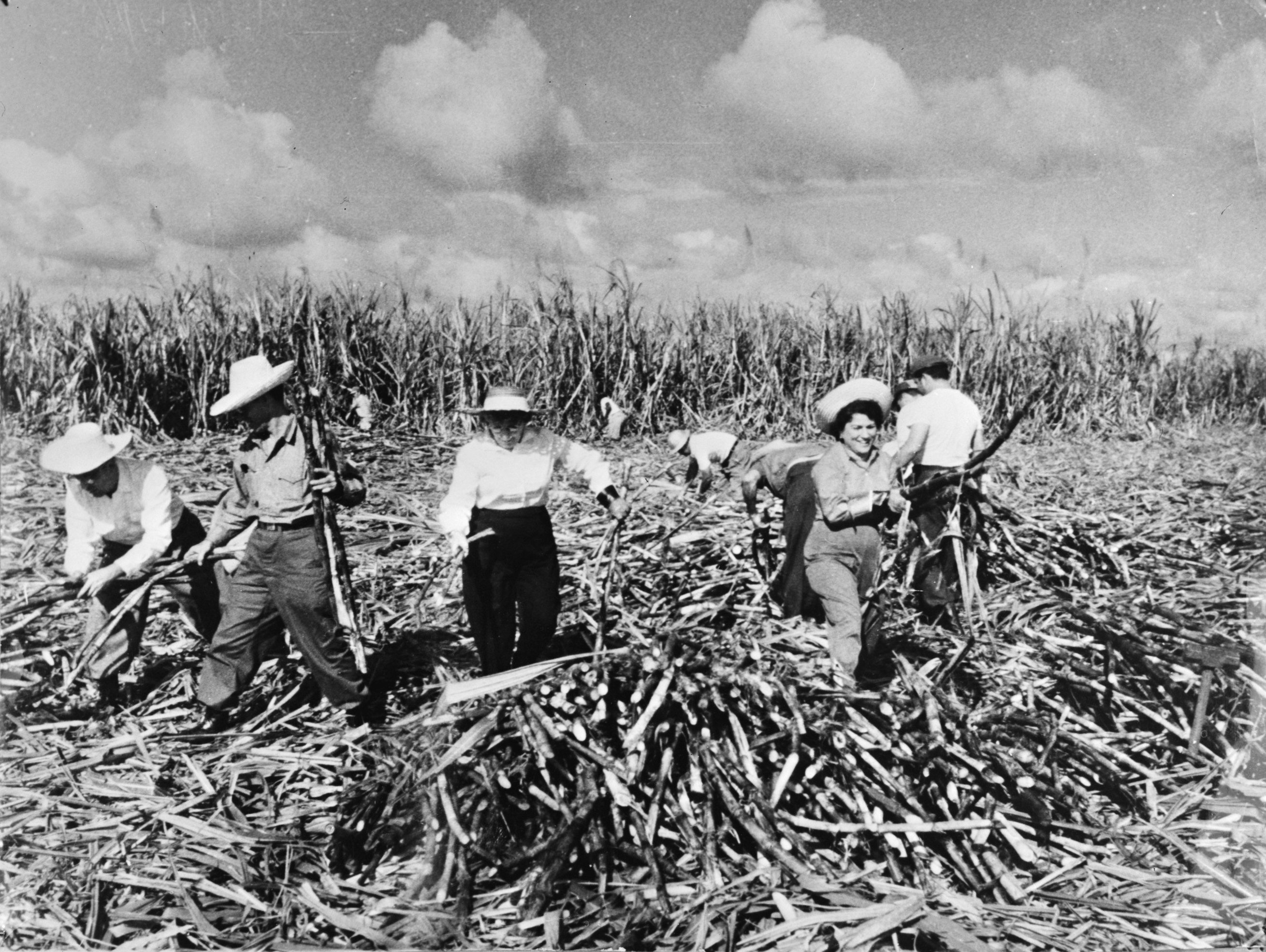
People chopping sugarcane for the 1970 zafra.

A political campaign titled "the Revolutionary Offensive" began in Cuba in 1968, to nationalize all remaining private small businesses, which at the time totaled to be about 58,000 small enterprises. The campaign would spur industrialization in Cuba and focus the economy on sugar production, specifically to a deadline for an annual sugar harvest of 10 million tons by 1970. The economic focus on sugar production involved international volunteers and the mobilization of workers from all sectors of the Cuban economy. The ten million ton harvest goal was not reached. Other sectors of the Cuban economy were neglected when large amounts of urban labor mobilized to the countryside.

The demise of the 1970 zafra was seen as an economic embarrassment, and encouraged Castro to begin decentralizing economic command, and building formal institutions. The Revolutionary Offensive and 1970 zafra were constructed with a Guevarist economic philosophy, after their demise, soviet economic philosophy appeared more pragmatic to Castro.

== History ==
=== Early institutionalization ===
Seeking Soviet help, from 1970 to 1972 Soviet economists re-organized Cuba's economy, founding the Cuban-Soviet Commission of Economic, Scientific and Technical Collaboration, while Soviet premier Alexei Kosygin visited in October 1971. In 1970, the political bureau of the Communist Party of Cuba held a meeting to initiate a series of studies as to how to build state institutions. This process of study was accelerated in 1972, and by the end of the year the Council of Ministers was restructured with a new Executive Committee. In July 1972, Cuba joined the Council for Mutual Economic Assistance (Comecon), an economic organization of socialist states, although this further limited Cuba's economy to agricultural production. In 1973 the judicial system was made subservient to executive decision-making. In 1974, early plans were put in place to form a new municipal government system. This system was tested in the Matanzas province, and eventually became the National Assembly of People's Power.

On October 24, 1974, a constitutional commission was established to draft a new constitution. Drafts of the constitution were passed around workplaces and civil societies. After popular debate and critique, a final draft was passed to the Communist Party for approval.

The Communist Party of Cuba for the first time allowed for its members to vote on leadership, in 1975. Despite this electoral reform, average Cubans were still not allowed to join the party. Membership was exclusive, and intended for politically exemplary people identified by the party.

=== 1976 constitution ===
The first congress of the Communist Party of Cuba which met in December 1975, approved the new constitution.

The constitution was ratified on February 24, 1976. According to scholar Carmelo Mesa-Lago, the constitution was 32% based on the Soviet constitution of 1936, and 36% was based on the Cuban constitution of 1940. The constitution established the National Assembly of People's Power as the democratic forum of law-making. While members of the body are elected, only one political party is legal (the Communist Party of Cuba), and candidates can only campaign on biographies, without presenting political opinions.

=== Economic policy ===
Beginning with the first Communist Party congress in 1975, the economy was to be managed by the System of Direction for Economic Planning (SDPE). This was done with the goal of boosting "revolutionary consciousness" among the workers, and maximizing efficiency. The SDPE recognized the law of value, financial transactions amongst state enterprises, defined taxes, and interest rates. All economic function was done to maximize profits, and successful managers were allowed to retain portions of profits.

Self-employment was legalized in 1978. "Mercados Libres Campesinos" were started in 1980 to alleviate economic bottleneck. They were markets where private farmers and home gardeners could sell their surplus produce directly to consumers, instead of to the state. Their creation was authorized by Decree No. 66 of the Council of State.

== Aftermath ==
A series of economic reforms in Cuba, officially titled the "Rectification of Errors and Negative Tendencies", began in 1986, and lasted until 1992. The reforms were aimed at eliminating private businesses, trade markets, which had been introduced into the Cuba, during the 1970s. The new reforms aimed to nationalize more of the economy and eliminate material incentives for extra labor, instead relying on moral enthusiasm alone. Castro often justified this return to moral incentives by mentioning the moral incentives championed by Che Guevara, and often alluded to Guevarism when promoting reforms.

== Historiography ==
=== Style of government ===
The historian Lillian Guerra claims that the politics of Fidel Castro's provisional government are best described as a "grassroots dictatorship". The government from 1959–1968 was illiberal, and enabled by mass participation in government programs, and a mass enthusiasm for the removal of civil liberties. According to Guerra, the "grassroots dictatorship" of the provisional government eventually morphed into a "total state" that assumed the right to direct every detail of citizens' lives. All claims of hegemonic mass support for the Cuban government became inaccurate and cosmetic by the 1980s.

Political researcher Yanina Welp has contended that the drafting of the 1976 constitution was not a truly democratic process, since participation in drafting and revising was restricted by the government. Welp claims that any illusions to a democratic process at the time were a "smokescreen" for the Cuban government, which is more akin to a hybrid regime.

Some scholars like Peter Roman, Nino Pagliccia, and Loreen Collin have written books concluding that the system that developed after the 1976 constitution, particularly with the National Assembly of People's Power, is a highly participatory democracy. Julio Cesar Guache offers a critical view of the "democracy" that developed, and argued it is informally controlled by the Committees for the Defense of the Revolution, who vet candidates. Samuel Farber argues that the National Assembly of People's Power is legally prohibited form political debate, and that real decision-making power still lied with the Castro brothers as heads of the Communist Party of Cuba. Farber mentions that the Communist Party often passes legislation without any consideration from the National Assembly of People's Power.

=== Sovietization ===
The sovietization thesis is a historiographical model proposed by scholars like political scientist Piero Gleijeses, and economist Carmelo Mesa-Lago. The sovietization thesis defines Cuba's political developments, and military actions, in the 1970s, completely in relation to the Soviet Union. The thesis proposes that Cuba's economic dependence on the Soviet Union, encouraged the Cuban government to model itself after the Soviet Union, and for the Cuban military to follow Soviet whims. According to Mesa-Lago, the sovietization of Cuba, reduced Cuba to a state subordinate to the Soviet Union, akin to how Batista's Cuba was subordinate to the United States.

Historian Anna Clayfield argues that Soviet influence does not wholly explain the political developments in Cuba in the 1970s. Clayfield argues that the Cuban intervention in Angola represented a clear break from Soviet foreign policy, and the constant promotion of national poet Jose Marti in Cuban media, represented a distinctly Cuban approach to culture, meaning Cuban culture did not become completely sovietized.

== See also ==
- 1973 Soviet economic reform
- Grey years
- Soviet-type economic planning

== Sources ==
- Bourne, Peter G. (1986). Fidel: A Biography of Fidel Castro. New York City: Dodd, Mead & Company. ISBN 978-0-396-08518-8.
- Coltman, Leycester (2003). The Real Fidel Castro. New Haven and London: Yale University Press. ISBN 978-0-300-10760-9.
- Quirk, Robert E. (1993). Fidel Castro. New York and London: W.W. Norton & Company. ISBN 978-0-393-03485-1.
