= Rectification process =

- 1986–1992
Institutionalization process	Special Period
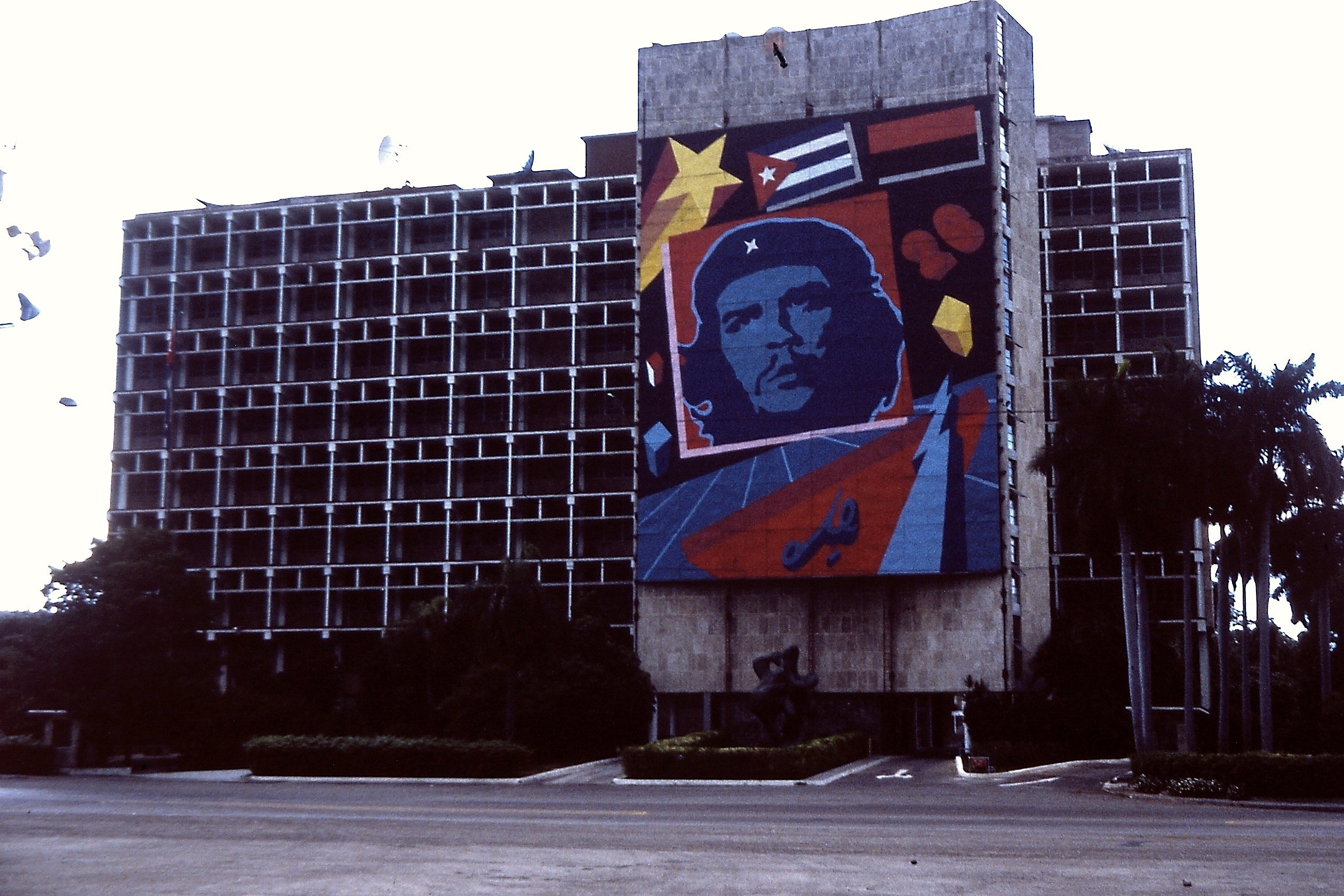
- Portrait of Che Guevara in Cuba (1990). Guevarism was a prominent ideological justification for the rectification process.
- Location: Cuba
- Leader(s): Fidel Castro, Raul Castro

The rectification process was a series of economic reforms in Cuba, officially titled the Rectification of Errors and Negative Tendencies. The process began in 1986, and lasted until 1992. The reforms were aimed at eliminating private businesses, trade markets, that had been introduced into the Cuban law and Cuban culture, during the 1970s. The new reforms aimed to nationalize more of the economy and eliminate material incentives for extra labor, instead relying on moral enthusiasm alone. Castro often justified this return to moral incentives by mentioning the moral incentives championed by Che Guevara, and often alluded to Guevarism when promoting reforms.

After the conclusion of the rectification process, the Cuban economy went into decline, and after the end of Soviet aid due to the dissolution of the Soviet Union, the Cuban economy devolved into a crisis known as the Special Period.

== Background ==
=== Early economic planning ===
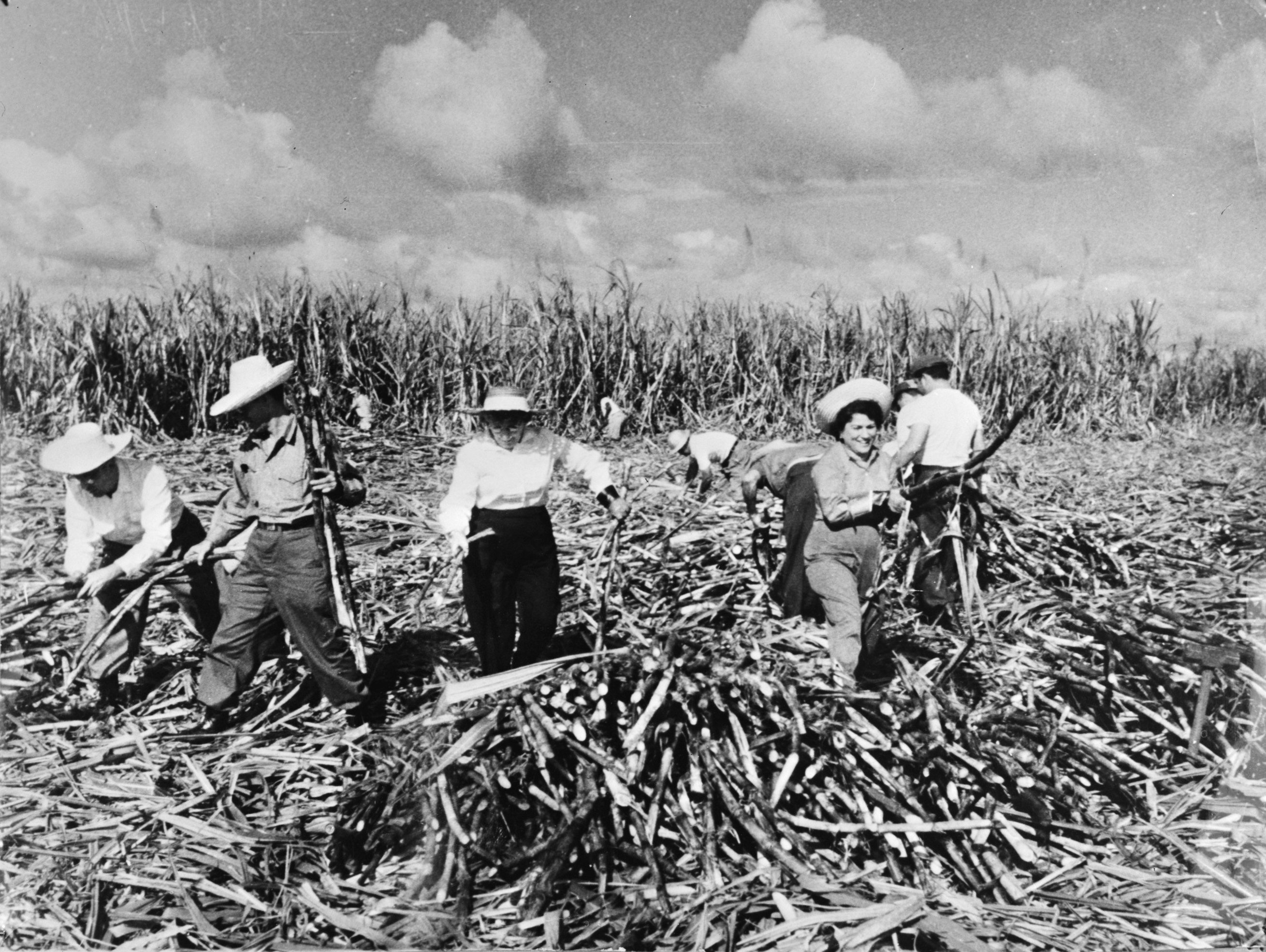
Cubans chopping sugarcane in 1970. This harvest was the end goal of the 1968 economic plan known as the Revolutionary Offensive.

Since the 1959 revolution, Cuba had engaged in various methods of economic reform and planning. Immediately after the revolution, there was an attempt to nationalize large businesses, from 1966 to 1970 there was an internal debate as to whether to implement a soviet style of economic planning (with material incentives for workers), or a Guevarist style of economic planning (with only moral incentives for workers). After 1971, there was a moderate effort to reintroduce some market mechanics back into the economy.

In 1982, Fidel Castro criticized the legal farmers' markets in Cuba. He condemned the speculation in the market, and the enrichment of merchants. He intended to highly tax the merchants, but his approval did not gain support in the Congress of the Communist Party of Cuba.

=== Reforms in the Soviet Union ===
After the advent of Perestroika and Glasnost in the Soviet Union, certain sectors of the Communist Party of Cuba began contemplating similar reforms in Cuba. The rectification process was enacted by Castro in defiance of these reformist tendencies in the party, that admired reformism in the Soviet Union.

== History ==
Fidel Castro began the Rectification Process in 1986. In February 1986, at the Congress of the Communist Party of Cuba, Castro announced "Now, we are going to build socialism", and criticized material incentives for laborers. Over the next months continued to criticize the Cuban bureaucracy and laziness. Economic reforms also included restructurings of party management. In 1986, the System of Direction for Economic Planning was made to obey the command of the Politboro of the Communist Party of Cuba.

On October 8, 1987, at the anniversary of Che Guevara's death, Castro gave a speech inferring Guevara would be horrified at the bureaucracy in Cuba, and the lack of patriotic enthusiasm of common workers.

Throughout the rectification process, private businesses became more heavily regulated, farmers markets were banned, material incentives were ended, and the minimum wage was increased.

Along with political consolidation, investigations into drug trafficking among political officials began. The most famous investigation was into General Arnaldo Ochoa who after denying his guilt, was executed by firing squad.

Since private construction was banned, micro-brigades were introduced. Micro-brigades were small self-managed construction units, were mobilized during the rectification process, and heralded by Fidel Castro a step away from economic bureaucracy, which was highly condemned. In a 1986 comment to the Granma newspaper, Fidel Castro stated:

These technocrats and bureaucrats are infected with a kind of ideological AIDS, a kind of AIDS that was destroying the defense of the revolution.

== Aftermath ==
After the dissolution of the Soviet Union, soviet aid ended, and a severe economic crisis termed "the Special Period" began in 1991. Despite the condemnation of markets during the rectification process, foreign businesses were soon encouraged to help build a tourist industry in Cuba. Eventually, foreigners and Cuban nationals would be legally bound to different economic policies, that even prevented Cubans from entering certain hotels.
