= Derzhavnost =

Russian concept of Russia as a great world state power

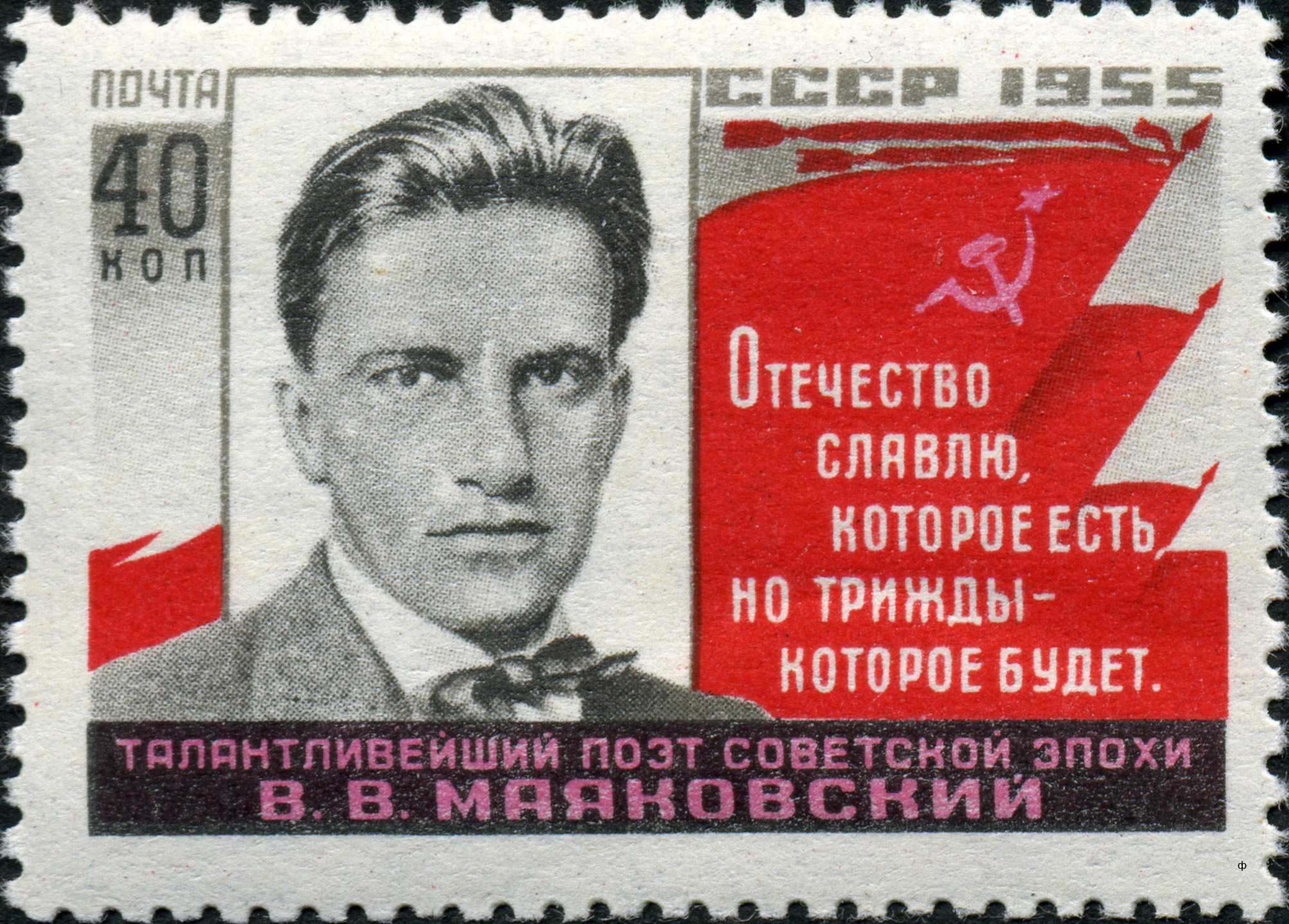
USSR postage stamp from 1955, issued in honor of Vladimir Mayakovsky. The stamp depicts his portrait, the State Flag of the USSR, and an excerpt from Mayakovsky's work "Khorosho! Octyabr'skya poema" (1927): Otechestvo slavlyu, kotoroye yest', // no trizhdy — kotoroye budet ("Good! The October Poem": "I glorify the Fatherland, which is, // but thrice — which will be").

The term derzhavnost (Russian: Державность, IPA: [dʲɪrˈʐavnəsʲtʲ]) is a concept in Russian political thought that denotes a qualitative characteristic of a state possessing the status of a great power. This concept includes not only having the material attributes of might (military potential, territorial expanse, natural and economic resources), but also a value and identity-based dimension that is akin to having the respect and recognitition of such power by other states.

Key elements of derzhavnost are the sacralization of the state as a supreme value that requires service, the principle of absolute sovereignty, and the claim to recognition of Russia's equal standing among the world's leading states. In contrast to the Western concept of "great power status", the term derzhavnost implies not only a set of capabilities, but an existential right to one's own sphere of influence (e.g. a Russian Monroe Doctrine), the realization of an historical mission, and a demand for respect from other states.

The historical roots of derzhavnost trace back to the Russian imperial era, where it was directly linked to the autocratic form of government and the messianic idea of "Moscow, third Rome", a state fulfilling the role of the "katechon" (the restrainer) against world chaos. In the 19th century, the ideological triad of Sergey Uvarov (being "Orthodoxy, Autocracy, and Nationality") institutionalized the priority of a strong centralized state over individual freedoms, thus cementing derzhavnost as a fundamental basis of Russian statehood. During the Soviet period, the term "velikoderzhavnost" (great-power chauvinism) was used primarily in a critical context. After 1991, the concept of derzhavnost experienced a revival as a reaction to the loss of superpower status, which was perceived in society as national humiliation and civilizational collapse.

== Terminology ==
The primary attribute of derzhavnost is its internal contradictoriness, a synthesis of seemingly mutually exclusive elements. On the one hand, it is inseparable from patriotism, love for the Motherland, respect for national history, traditions, and cultural values. It nourishes a sense of national pride and the desire to preserve the country's territorial integrity and independence. On the other hand, derzhavnost is historically closely linked with authoritarianism, etatism (the predominance of the state's role in all spheres of life), dictatorship, and disregard for the rights and freedoms of the individual. This negative side manifests itself particularly vividly in conflict with the principles of democracy and federalism, when the interests of the state are placed above the interests of its constituent peoples and citizens. This duality is deeply rooted in the historical genesis of Russian statehood.

== History ==
Origins of derzhavnost lie in the centuries-old tradition of autocratic power, formed under specific geopolitical and climatic conditions. Researchers such as Vasily Klyuchevsky and Mykola Kostomarov link its formation to the necessity of survival across vast expanses, harsh nature, constant external threats, and the need for resource concentration. In pre-Mongol Rus', power was not absolute, being distributed among the prince, the veche (popular assembly), the boyars, and the church. The Mongol-Tatar yoke (13th–15th centuries) had a decisive influence on the formation of the derzhavny ("mono-subject") type of power. The conquest was not accompanied by legal treaties; relations were built on the personal dependence of princes on the khans, which cultivated a "slave mentality" and led to the disappearance of legal guarantees for the population.

The khans provided the Moscow princes with the necessary "critical resource of coercion," allowing them to suppress the resistance of the boyars and the veche, forming a new political reality where power became the sole socially significant subject. This "Russian system" of power, honed over centuries, placed the state above society and the individual. The final formation of the ideology of derzhavnost took place in the Muscovite Tsardom. Ivan the Terrible, whose reign became the apogee of autocracy, asserted that the monarch's will could not be limited by any laws or institutions. Power was perceived not as an instrument for serving society, but as a sacred given. The Tsar was seen by his subjects not as a tyrant, but as the "Tsar-Father" (tsar-batyushka), appointed by God, which gave rise to a stable paternalism—a readiness to entrust the state with solving all problems.

Peter I, while a harsh autocrat, attempted to rationalize this model by explaining the necessity of power through the common good, but did not change its essence. Catherine II, inspired by Enlightenment ideas, tried to give autocracy more civilized forms by appealing to the "common good," yet the foundation of power remained unshakable. Throughout the 19th century, the derzhavny idea served as the basis for suppressing any liberation and separatist movements (the Decembrists, Poland, the Caucasus).

=== In Soviet Period ===
The Soviet period represented a new transformation of derzhavnost. Although the official ideology denied continuity with the Tsarist regime, in practice the Bolsheviks reproduced and even intensified hyper-centralization of power. Historian M.V. Stoliarov, analyzing the works of Vladimir Lenin and Joseph Stalin, shows that the declared federalism and the right of nations to self-determination were merely instruments for preserving a unified state. Stalinist national policy and "autonomization" effectively meant building a unitary state under the aegis of centralized party power. Stalin strengthened the derzhavny tradition by combining it with great-power patriotism and suppressing any manifestations of national independence. During the Brezhnev era, the concept of a "new historical community—the Soviet people" was an attempt to definitively unify multinational society under the aegis of the derzhava, which, however, did not prevent its subsequent collapse.

=== In Post-Soviet Russia ===
In post-Soviet Russia, derzhavnost experienced a revival as a reaction to the decentralization of the 1990s and the search for a new national identity after the collapse of the USSR. Proponents of derzhavnost (communists, national-patriots of various shades) criticized Yeltsin's federalism as a threat to the country's unity, leading to separatism.

The rise to power of Vladimir Putin marked a new stage in the development of the derzhavny idea. His policy, aimed at strengthening the "vertical of power" (creation of federal districts, reform of the Federation Council), was termed a "symbiosis of statehood [derzhavnost], political conservatism, and a tendency towards democracy and modernization" The term "dictatorship of law" itself, actively used in the early 2000s, was intended to justify the strengthening of state control in the name of order and the country's integrity. Researchers draw direct historical parallels between the creation of the institution of presidential plenipotentiary envoys in the federal districts and the system of governors-general in the Russian Empire, seeing in this a return to traditional methods of centralized governance.

== Derzhavnost and Federalism ==
The key contradiction of contemporary Russian politics, according to M.V. Stoliarov, lies in the conflict between two tendencies: federalism (decentralization, consideration of regional and ethnic interests, treaty relations) and derzhavnost (centralization, unitarism, dominance of the center). The policy of strengthening the vertical of power and the dictatorship of law, despite its patriotic appeal, is viewed by many experts and politicians as a threat to the development of federalism, leading to increased authoritarian tendencies and the suppression of regional autonomy.

The 1993 Constitution of the Russian Federation proclaimed Russia a democratic, federal, rule-of-law state. However, real politics often comes into conflict with it. The derzhavny tradition prompts the authorities to act based on notions of "higher state interests," rather than on the balance of interests between the federal center and the subjects of the federation. This manifests in the desire to unify regional legislation, limit treaty practices, and place regional elites under strict control. In this context, derzhavnost becomes an ideological justification for deviating from the principles of genuine federalism.

== Criticism ==
Derzhavnost finds a broad response in a society weary of chaos and instability. Nostalgia for a "strong hand" and a great power, distrust of democratic institutions create a breeding ground for authoritarian sentiments. Many Russians are willing to sacrifice part of their freedoms for the sake of order and stability, making derzhavnost a powerful political resource. However, the authors of the book warn against equating derzhavnost with effective state governance, recalling the tragic lessons of history when the pursuit of "greatness" resulted in repression and the suppression of the individual.

In post-Soviet Russia, derzhavnost is integrated into the official political discourse as a form of statism (gosudarstvennichestvo), within which a strong state is viewed as the guarantor of stability, public order, and overcoming the crisis phenomena of the 1990s. In practice, this is expressed in the prioritization of sovereignty as an absolute value, the rejection of a unipolar model of world order, and the conviction that genuine sovereignty is accessible only to a limited circle of great powers. This perspective shapes the perception of the European order established after the Cold War as unjust and as denying Russia's historically conditioned right to a special ("privileged") position in the post-Soviet space.

== Role in Foreign Policy ==
Within the framework of strategic culture and foreign policy, derzhavnost determines the perception of international relations as a zero-sum game: the loss of influence in the "near abroad" is seen as an existential threat to the very status of a great power. This concept synthesizes elements of political realism (the struggle for spheres of influence) and constructivism (the formation of an identity as a civilizational power legitimized by historical right). Researchers notice the existential nature of derzhavnost: it is not so much a pragmatic foreign policy goal as a condition for the ontological security of the nation. In this logic, the recognition of equality among great powers takes precedence over and has priority over universal liberal norms.

Contemporary interpretations allow for the identification of the specific nature of derzhavnost in comparison with the Western concept of a great power. The emphasis shifts from possessing material capabilities to the categories of status and "respect." Derzhavnost represents a form of state nationalism where the greatness of the power is an unconditional priority in relation to individual rights and freedoms. In the context of escalating conflict with the West, this concept strengthens domestic legitimation through the narrative of "revival" and resistance to historical "humiliation."

== See also ==
- Monroe Doctrine
- Russian Idea
- Russian irredentism
