= Ideological diversionism =

Concept in Cuban communism coined by Raúl Castro

Ideological diversionism ("Diversionismo Ideológico", also ideological diversion, ideological sabotage or ideological subversion in Soviet phraseology) is a term first used by Raúl Castro while he was Commander in Chief of the Armed Forces. Later, as President of the Council of State of Cuba, he discussed it in a speech to the Ministry of the Interior (MININT) on June 6, 1972 to celebrate its eleventh anniversary. The speech was later published in its entirety in the Cuban magazine Bohemia under the title "El diversionismo Ideologico, arma sutil que esgrimen los enemigos contra la Revolución".

"Ideological Diversionism", as used by Castro, defined the discursive practice of subjects who appropriated Marxist and communist rhetoric without the "true revolutionary commitment". The "diversionist" thus was a camouflaged subject that spoke as it were from inside the lines of the Revolutionary cadres, but in reality subscribing the vices and habits of bourgeoisie values. Ideological diversionism redefined the political culture of the Cuban social landscape during the decades of the 1970s and 1980s, functioning even as a legal and moral category to proscribe and demoralize dissent, and as revolutionary citizens that adopted norms that the State sought as deviant from standard social conducts.

== Origins ==
=== Raúl Castro's definition ===
Castro's speech on "Ideological Diversionism" sought to come to terms with the supposedly peaceful aggressions by imperialists. The argument behind this thesis was that since imperialism could not defeat socialist countries, their new form of aggression was to destabilize the socialist culture and developmental socialist ideals through the means of propaganda as "peace means" of subversion. This would consequently entail that specially the youth and the intellectual classes were the most prone to ideological manipulation. As Raúl makes clear at one point during his speech:

Ideological diversionism is done through a mediete action on the intelligence, sentiments, and the mind of people. The whole system of ideological diversion is oriented towards this goal at planetary scale. Their particular objective is the youth, and in particular the intellectual creative class, since they are considered as the receptors to their propaganda. In one of to the special instructions to the agents of the psychological war, they require focussing their work in local authorities that would influence in the shaping of public opinion.

=== Cuban intellectual discourse ===
After Raúl Castro's speech in 1972, many State intellectuals conceptualized and redefined the term of ideological diversionism as a concept to put into use in the "struggle" against imperialist heterodox social norms. In 1974, one of Cuba most important Marxist cultural critics, Jose Antonio Portuondo, delivered the lecture "Martí y el Diversionismo Ideologico", where he extended Castro's theoretical argument by offering a national genealogy of the concept, tracing it to the history of patriot and national independence martyr José Martí. According to Portuondo, it was Jose Marti, a nationalist and exiled Cuban, well before Raúl Castro, who first attacked "ideological diversionism" as a way to unmask those who fought against independence and in favor of the division within nationalist forces of the nation. In Portuondo's reading, Martí becomes the symbolic figure in which ideological diversionism is neutralized and contained, since there is never a possibility to diverge from what is in the interest of the Nation.

In 1979, a rather different intellectual, the educator Gaspar García Gallo, delivered a lecture entitled "El diversionismo Ideológico" in the Psychiatric Hospital of Havana. Unlike Portuondo, for Gaspar Gallo "diversionism" was rooted in the structure of human nature itself and it was to be contested from the biological as well as the psychological view of point. Intertwining dialectical materialism and pseudoscientific theories, a program that was beginning to take shape in the Lenin School of Havana as a pedagogical project, Gaspar Gallo argued that ideological diversionism, rooted in bourgeois vices and habits, was a product of an ill and corrupted nature. These corruptions included, but were not limited to, homosexuality, western popular culture like The Beatles, laziness, and intellectualism. Gaspar Gallo offered, in the vein of naturalist of the 19th century, physiological stereotypes in which one could identified "members" of this psychological tendencies and deviations in the same way that later on students of the Cuban Communist Youth (UJC) will illustrate in the university journal Mella and Alma Mater. A couple of years before the lecture given by Gaspar Gallo, "ideological diversionism" was integrated into the official legal document Tesis y Resoluciones del Primer Congreso del Partido Comunista de Cuba (1976).

=== Soviet influences ===
In the Cuban intellectual discussion, the concept of ideological diversionism is sometimes referred as having direct influence from the era of Stalinism. Although in the Stalinist historiography the direct concept is never articulated as such, one could point for a possible intellectual origin the 1929 text "On Right Deviation in our Party", where Stalin heavily critiques Bukharin, the kulak culture, and "social democracy" tendencies within the Soviet Communist Party. Deviations, according to Stalin, unlike Mao, must never be present in the Party, since it a structure of division in the vanguard of the People. Stalin's deviation differs from the "diversionist" position to the extent that it never seeks to establish a "foreign" influence or a linguistic appropriation of Marxist categories as an aesthetic of concealment. Stalin's critique of deviation centered on the nature and necessity to keep the nature of class struggle as a driven principle of Soviet Society. In the Cuban case, diversionism besides being about the formation of a class unity, as it was about exclusion of a particular social subject.

Another notable work about diversionism from the Soviet Union is Prosčety ideologičeskix diversantov (The Miscalculations of Ideological Saboteurs) by V. I. Strepetov, written in 1976, and translated into Spanish in 1980 by Editorial Progreso. This means that this work was read and perhaps studied in Latin America and Cuba, and that it was most probably influenced by Raúl Castro's speech of 1972. Strepetov as Raúl Castro, sees the danger of diversionism as a flow of ideas coming from the West and that seek to destroy the anti-bourgeois principles of the Soviet Union. Diversionism is seeing as an activity and even "sabotage" to undermine the different relations and core principles of the soviet people, including labor, discipline, and loyalty. Confronting the discourses of Western Marxism and the crisis of theoretical paradigms that explicate the new capitalist post-industrial constellation, Strepetov suggests that ideological diversionism fosters a new tool for imperial and United States domination, not through violence and war, but through culture and rhetoric. Precisely the Russian term diversantov means the flow of ideas coming "from outside", and not merely a deviation from the norm.

== Enforcement ==
=== Cultural censorship ===
Ideological diversionism was not only a political or juridical term, since it also functioned, even before Raúl Castro's speech in 1972, to police conducts and norms of everyday citizens and the production of culture, whether it was fashion, literature, or cinema. Most of the cultural production censored since the mid-1960s in Cuba—novels like Adire y el tiempo roto (1967) by Manuel Granados, and poetry books like Fuera del Juego (1968) by Heberto Padilla—were judged and accused from the paradigm of diversionism. It was in the university circles and groups where ideological diversionism was intensified as a hate speech against plural thinking of an array of social actors.

As Mella or Alma Mater, two of the official publications of the University of Havana makes clear, the diversionist were from the "intellectualized student", who wore sandals, carry books by Jean-Paul Sartre and had homosexual conducts, to the bureaucrat, those interested in fashion or even those who would mimic The Beatles' haircuts (see Figure 1). These deviant cultural incarnations were not only not possible in the public sphere, but also had to be eliminated from all possible political and social activity to prevent contamination. In everyday speech, "diversionists" were labeled as "débiles" (weaks), "raros" (weirdos), and "gusanos" (worms), terms that picked out the heterogeneity of social groups that contested the Revolution from below starting in the first decade of the Revolution, as personally witnessed by Anna Veltfort, who was an art history student at the University of Havana (see Figure 1).

Figure 1. "A los gusanos hay que hervirlos". Revista Mella, June 1965. "Los Gusanos".

=== Political censorship ===
Ideological diversionism was a cultural logic that led the way for orthodox Marxists to foster notions of ideological purity and normalization in Marxist culture. Hence, a great part of Western Marxism, from Jean-Paul Sartre's humanist existentialism and the Frankfurt School, to Antonio Gramsci and the debates of structuralism and post-structuralism in France, were banned from intellectual and academic circles both within and outside of the University of Havana. In the need to suppress "cultural" horizons of Marxist thinking, in favor of a "scientific mode" of dialectical materialism, ideological diversionism was by itself a cultural invention to suspend all possible cultural articulation of Marxism as such. In the Cuba of the 1970s, as one could see from journals such as Educación or Cuba Socialista, Marxism was understood as a hard science that little or nothing had to do with everyday hybridity of cultural forms and habits.

The sovietization of the political system of Cuba, starting in 1971 with the National Congress of Education and Culture and with the first Constitution of Communist Party in 1976, further catalyzed the closure of the many different and plural positions within socialism, Marxism, social democracy, and syndicalism during the first five years after the triumph of the Cuban Revolution. Ideological diversionism was the operation by which power articulated a totalizing enframing of a national socialist culture.

Figure 2. "El intelectualizado" as a "ideological diversionist" subject. Revista Mella, 1964. El Intelectualizado.

== Legacy ==
From an analysis of the politics of memory, many Cubans still remember the usages of ideological diversionism in everyday life, such as in schools, the street, the police, and the televised speeches of Fidel Castro. When asked to a 58-year-old Cuban from Miami accused and imprisoned for ideological diversionism, he remembered:

Of course I remember the use of the term "ideological diversionism", it was a word that was used to brand people who liked things from abroad; be it expensive shoes, rock music, or even receiving letters from his exiled relatives. A diversionist was also anyone who did not sympathize or believe in the values of the Revolution, and therefore felt outside of that society. They did acts of repudiation to others, such as throwing eggs at them.

Not only are testimonies alive in the living memory of Cubans within and outside the island, but in recent cultural production the term has also reappeared. For instance, the punk band "Porno Para Ricardo" has included the term in many of their lyrics, and the frontman of the band, Gorki Águila, sometimes wore on stage a t-shirt that read "Viva el diversionismo Ideologico!" ("Hurray for ideological diversionism!"), a public provocation that today has lost all its radical intentions in contemporary Cuba.

In 2012, the Cuban poet Alexis Romay published his book 'Diversionismo Ideologico', where he writes about the political and social realities of Cubans of both shores through décima poems.

The young Cuban visual artist Hamlet Lavastida has worked through many of his pieces, the "ideological diversionism speech" and many of the political texts that were instrumental to the making of a new revolutionary subject after the Cuban Revolution.
