= Stefan Morawski =

Polish philosopher, historian of aesthetics, esthetician and culturologist

Stefan Tadeusz Morawski (20 October 1921 – 2 December 2004) was a Polish philosopher, historian of aesthetics, esthetician and culturologist.

== Biography ==
Morawski was a student of Władysław Tatarkiewicz and a graduate of the University of Warsaw.

From 1945 to 1948 he belonged to the Polish Socialist Party and then a he belonged to the Polish United Workers' Party from its formation until 1968. He was a member of the PZPR University Committee at the University of Warsaw.

In the years 1960–1964 he was the creator and editor-in-chief of the annual Estetyka, later transformed into Studia Estetyczne.

Until 1968 he was the head of the department of aesthetics at the University of Warsaw until he was removed after the March events for political unreliability. He then lectured abroad in United States for a short period. After returning to Poland, from 1971 he collaborated with the Institute of Art of the Polish Academy of Sciences, where from 1979 he published the annual "Polish Art Studies" in English and French. In the 1980s he conducted seminars at the University of Łódź. At the end of the 1980s, he also returned to the University of Warsaw, where he headed the department of philosophy of culture.

== Major works ==
- Lee Baxandall and Stefan Morawski. Marx and Engels on Literature and Art. St. Louis: Telos Press, 1973
- Inquiries into the Fundamentals of Aesthetics. MIT Press, 1974
- The Troubles with Postmodernism. Routledge 1996
