= Alice in Wondertown =

Alice in Wondertown (original title in Spanish: Alicia en el pueblo de Maravillas) is a 1991 film directed by Daniel Díaz Torres and produced by the ICAIC (Cuban Institute of Cinematographic Art and Industry). Theatre release date: July 13, 1991. It was a film of satire, absurdity and horror, seen as a criticism of the problems of Cuban society, and it caused a significant controversy in the country. Cinema critic Juan Antonio García Borrero has been planning to include it in a book under a tentative title Diez películas que estremecieron a Cuba (Ten Films That Shook Cuba)

== Plot ==
Superficially, the film is framed as a murder mystery. The film begins as the protagonist, Alice, tries to escape (as it will be revealed later) from the Sanatorio Maravillas de Noveras where she was held to be "reeducated" from her rebellious behavior that violated the official regulations of the city. She managed to hitch a ride in the back of a pickup truck full of workers, but then she is attacked by a strange cloaked person whom he recognizes as "compañero Director" of the sanatorium. She struggles with him, causing him to fall overboard as the truck crosses a high bridge. Alice is accused of murder. However, the body mysteriously disappears, she is relieved of murder charges, and she narrates her story, presented as a flashback in the film. Her adventure starts when she is delegated to a small town of Maravillas ("Wondertown"; maravilla=wonder). While the title is an allusion to Alice in Wonderland (as supported by the starting cadres of the film), it is not an adaptation of the English book or its elements.

The major characters of the film, a school teacher, black market traders, lazy service providers, disgraced priest, etc., are exiled to this town for their violations, and are forced into a submission by a supernatural city mayor. Only after Alice matures and stops blindly believing in the authorities, she manages to return to her real world.

== Discussion and reception ==
There are a number of allusions and parallels, but they are difficult to recognize to people who did not live in Cuba at this time period. In fact, Juan Borrero mentioned that a young Cuban born the year the film was cast told him that he could not understand why the film caused such a controversy.

While the film received positive reviews at international festivals, Cuban authorities instructed the media to repudiate the film and it received highly negative reviews in the country. It was banned after only three days after the release in the theatres and only ten years later it was shown for a brief period. Nevertheless illegal copies were in circulation, and these could be viewed in private video arcades legalized in 1993.

== Awards ==
- Premio del Comité de la Paz(1991)
- Special mention of the International Jury at the Berlin International Film Festival (1991)
- Special mention. Festival Internacional de Cine de Montevideo y Punta del Este, Uruguay (1993).
