= Nikolai Berdyaev =

Russian existentialist philosopher and theologian (1874–1948)

- Николай Бердяев
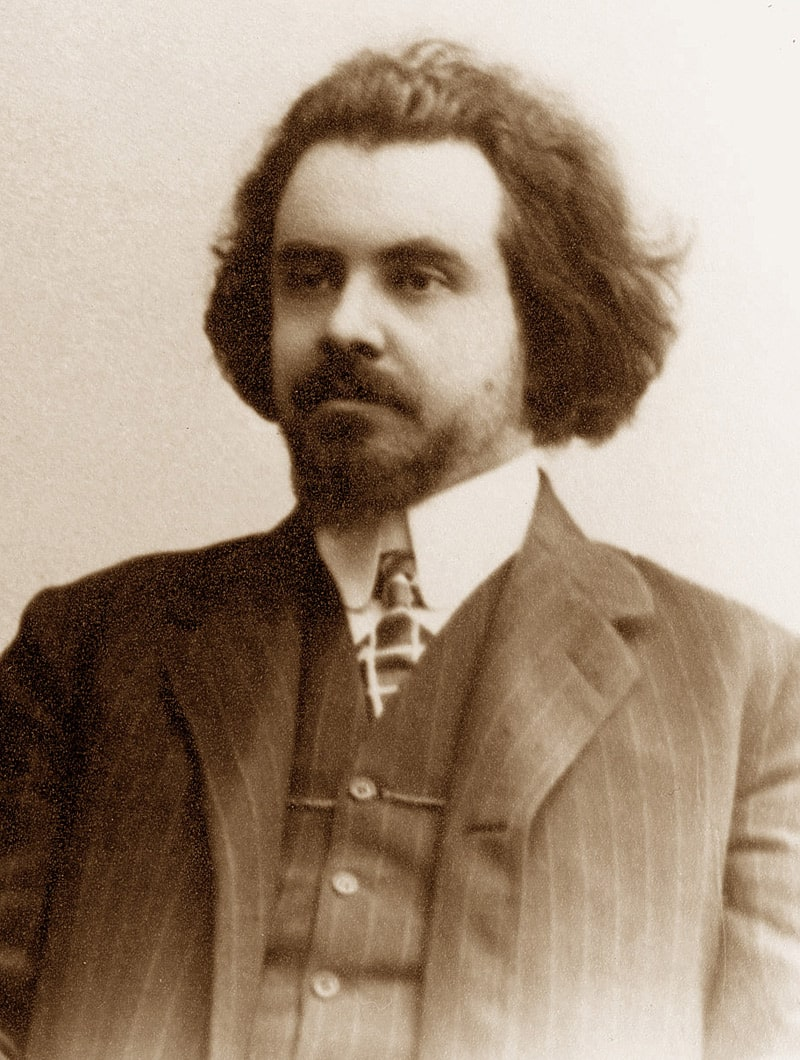
- Born: Nikolai Alexandrovich Berdyaev; 18 March [O.S. 6 March] 1874; Obukhov, Kiev Governorate, Russian Empire (now Ukraine)
- Died: 24 March 1948 (aged 74); Clamart, France

Education
- Education: Kiev University (attended)

Philosophical work
- Era: 20th-century philosophy
- Region: Russian philosophy
- School: Christian existentialism, personalism
- Institutions: University of Moscow
- Main interests: Christian philosophy, creativity, eschatology, freedom
- Notable ideas: Emphasizing the existential spiritual significance of human freedom and the human person

Nikolai Alexandrovich Berdyaev (Note: Alternative historical spellings of his surname in English include "Berdiaev" and "Berdiaeff", and of his given name "Nicolas" and "Nicholas".) (/bərˈdjɑːjɛf, -jɛv/; Russian: Николай Александрович Бердяев; 18 March [O.S. 6 March] 1874 – 24 March 1948) was a Russian philosopher, theologian, and Christian existentialist who emphasized the existential spiritual significance of human freedom and the human person.

== Biography ==
Berdyaev was born on 18 March [O.S. 6 March] 1874 in Obukhiv, Kiev Governorate (present-day Ukraine) to an aristocratic military family. His father, Alexander Mikhailovich Berdyaev, came from a long line of Russian nobility. Almost all of Alexander Mikhailovich's ancestors served as high-ranking military officers, but in the sixth grade, he left the cadet school and began studying for the matriculation exams for admission to the university. Nikolai's mother, Alina Sergeevna Berdyaeva, was half-French and came from the top levels of both French and Russian nobility. She also had Polish, Georgian and Tatar origins.

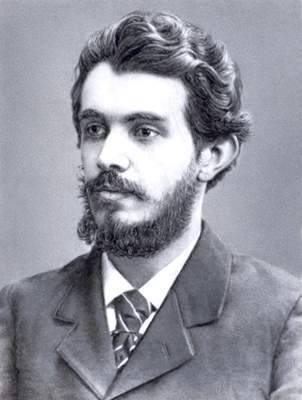
Nikolai Berdyaev in 1910

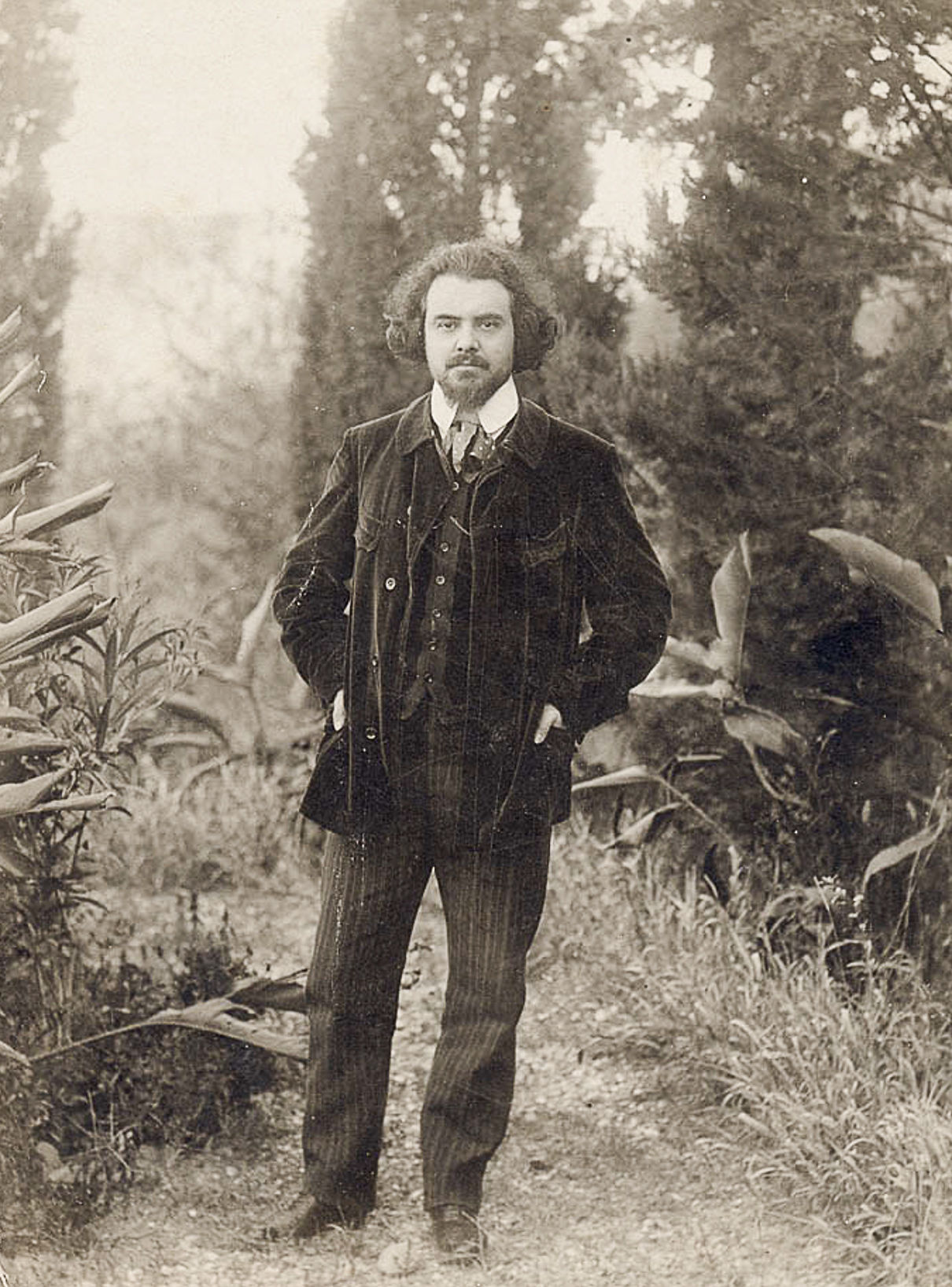
Nikolai Berdyaev in 1912

Berdyaev decided on an intellectual career and entered the Kiev University in 1894. It was a time of revolutionary fervor among the students and the intelligentsia. He became a Marxist for a period and was arrested in a student demonstration and expelled from the university. His involvement in illegal activities led in 1897 to three years of internal exile to Vologda in northern Russia.

== Social activities ==
In 1899, his first article "F. A. Lange and Critical Philosophy in their relation to Socialism" was published in the magazine "Die Neue Zeit".

In the following years, before his expulsion from the USSR in 1922, Berdyaev wrote numerous articles and several books, of which, according to him, he later truly appreciated only two — "The Meaning of Creativity" and "The Meaning of History."

A fiery 1913 article, entitled "Quenchers of the Spirit", criticising the rough purging of Imiaslavie Russian monks on Mount Athos by the Holy Synod of the Russian Orthodox Church using tsarist troops, caused him to be charged with the crime of blasphemy, the punishment for which was exile to Siberia for life. The World War and the Bolshevik Revolution prevented the matter coming to trial.

Berdyaev's disaffection culminated, in 1919, with the foundation of his own private academy, the "Free Academy of Spiritual Culture". It was primarily a forum for him to lecture on the hot topics of the day and to present them from a Christian point of view. He also presented his opinions in public lectures, and every Tuesday, the academy hosted a meeting at his home because official Soviet anti-religious activity was intense at the time and the official policy of the Bolshevik government, with its Soviet anti-religious legislation, strongly promoted state atheism.

In 1920, Berdiaev became professor of philosophy at the University of Moscow. In the same year, he was accused of participating in a conspiracy against the government; he was arrested and jailed.

Felix Dzerzhinsky, the feared head of the Cheka, personally interrogated him, and he gave his interrogator a solid dressing down on the problems with Bolshevism. Novelist Aleksandr Solzhenitsyn in his book The Gulag Archipelago recounts the incident as follows:

[Berdyaev] was arrested twice; he was taken in 1922 for a midnight interrogation with Dzerjinsky; Kamenev was also there.... But Berdyaev did not humiliate himself, he did not beg, he firmly professed the moral and religious principles by virtue of which he did not adhere to the party in power; and not only did they judge that there was no point in putting him on trial, but he was freed. Now there is a man who had a "point of view"!

After his expulsion from the USSR on September 29, 1922, on the so-called "Philosophers' ships", Berdyaev and other émigrés went to Berlin, where he founded an academy of philosophy and religion, but economic and political conditions in the Weimar Republic caused him and his wife to move to Paris in 1923. He transferred his academy there, and taught, lectured and wrote, working for an exchange of ideas with the French and European intellectual community, and participated in a number of international conferences.

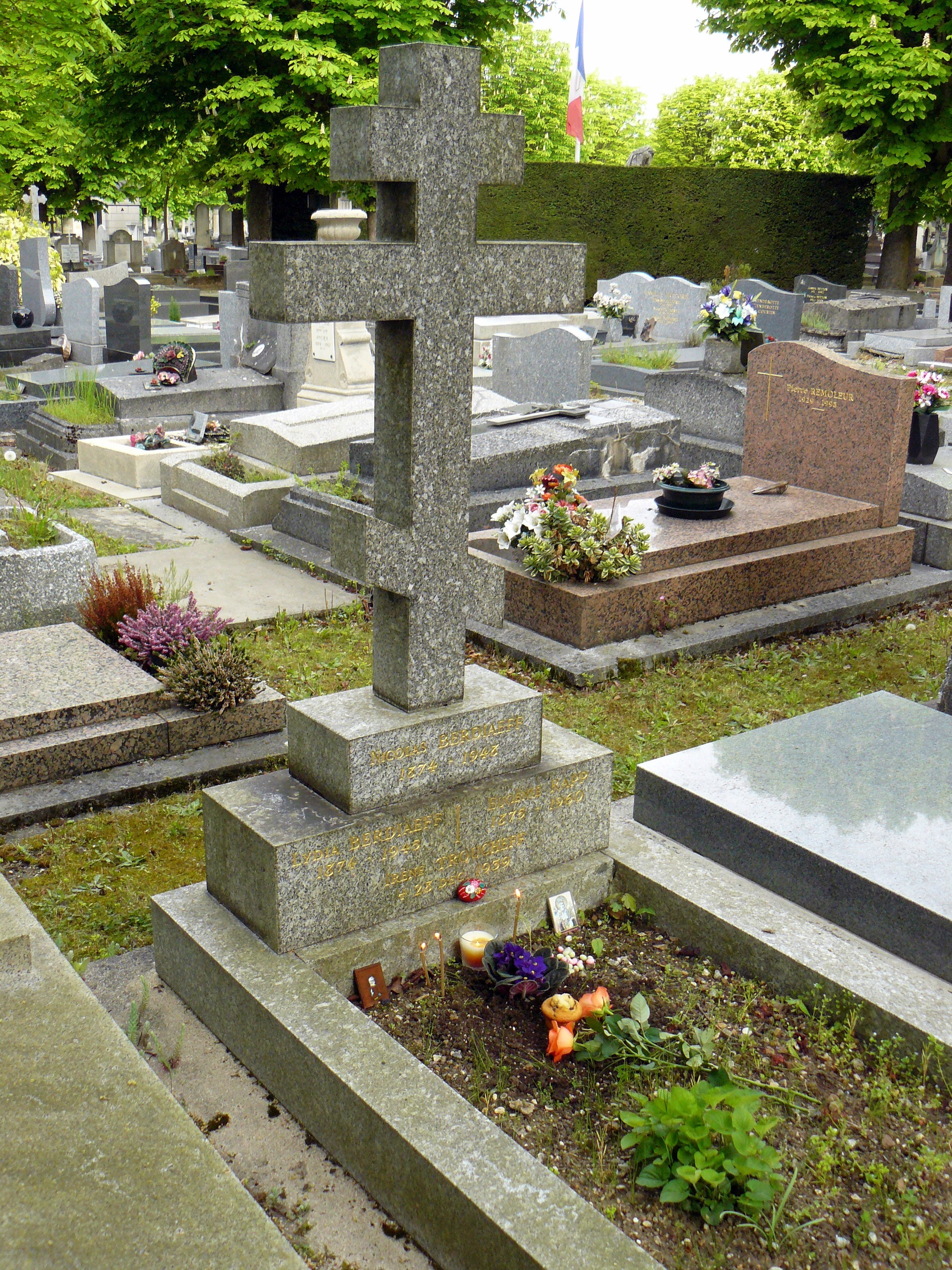
Berdyaev's grave, Clamart (France)

== Philosophical work ==
According to Marko Marković, Berdyaev "was an ardent man, rebellious to all authority, an independent and "negative" spirit. He could assert himself only in negation and could not hear any assertion without immediately negating it, to such an extent that he would even be able to contradict himself and to attack people who shared his own prior opinions". According to Marina Makienko, Anna Panamaryova, and Andrey Gurban, Berdyaev's works are "emotional, controversial, bombastic, affective and dogmatic". They summarise that, according to Berdyaev, "man unites two worlds – the world of the divine and the natural world. ... Through the freedom and creativity the two natures must unite... To overcome the dualism of existence is possible only through creativity.

David Bonner Richardson described Berdyaev's philosophy as Christian existentialism and personalism. Other authors, such as political theologian Tsoncho Tsonchev, interpret Berdyaev as "communitarian personalist" and Slavophile. According to Tsonchev, Berdyaev's philosophical thought rests on four "pillars": freedom, creativity, person, and communion.

One of the central themes of Berdyaev's work was philosophy of love. At first he systematically developed his theory of love in a special article published in the journal Pereval (Russian: Перевал) in 1907. Then he gave gender issues a notable place in his book The Meaning of the Creative Act (1916). According to him, 1) erotic energy is an eternal source of creativity, 2) eroticism is linked to beauty, and eros means search for the beautiful.

He also published works about Russian history and the Russian national character. In particular, he wrote about Russian nationalism:

The Russian people did not achieve their ancient dream of Moscow, the Third Rome. The ecclesiastical schism of the seventeenth century revealed that the muscovite tsardom is not the third Rome. The messianic idea of the Russian people assumed either an apocalyptic form or a revolutionary; and then there occurred an amazing event in the destiny of the Russian people. Instead of the Third Rome in Russia, the Third International was achieved, and many of the features of the Third Rome pass over to the Third International. The Third International is also a Holy Empire, and it also is founded on an Orthodox faith. The Third International is not international, but a Russian national idea.

Though sometimes quoted as a Christian anarchist for his emphasis on theology and critique of statist and Marxist socialism, Berdyaev did not self-identify as such and differentiated himself from Leo Tolstoy.

Nikolai Berdyaev's work is also featured in the dedication of Aldous Huxley's 1932 novel "Brave New World".

== Theology and relations with Russian Orthodox Church ==
Berdyaev was a member of the Russian Orthodox Church, and believed Orthodoxy was the religious tradition closest to early Christianity.

Nicholas Berdyaev was an Orthodox Christian. However, it must be said that he was of an independent and somewhat "liberal" sort. Berdyaev also criticized the Russian Orthodox Church and described his views as anticlerical. Yet he considered himself closer to Orthodoxy than either Catholicism or Protestantism. According to him, "I can not call myself a typical Orthodox of any kind; but Orthodoxy was near to me (and I hope I am nearer to Orthodoxy) than either Catholicism or Protestantism. I never severed my link with the Orthodox Church, although confessional self-satisfaction and exclusiveness are alien to me."

Berdyaev is frequently presented as one of the important Russian Orthodox thinkers of the 20th century. However, neopatristic scholars such as Florovsky have questioned whether his philosophy is essentially Orthodox in character, and emphasize his western influences. But Florovsky was savaged in a 1937 Journal Put' article by Berdyaev. Paul Valliere has pointed out the sociological factors and global trends which have shaped the Neopatristic movement, and questions their claim that Berdyaev and Vladimir Solovyov are somehow less authentically Orthodox.

Berdyaev affirmed universal salvation, as did several other important Orthodox theologians of the 20th century. Along with Sergei Bulgakov, he was instrumental in bringing renewed attention to the Orthodox doctrine of apokatastasis, which had largely been neglected since it was expounded by Maximus the Confessor in the seventh century, although he rejected Origen's articulation of this doctrine.

The aftermath of the Russian Revolution and Civil War, along with Soviet efforts towards the separation of church and state, caused the Russian Orthodox émigré diaspora to splinter into three Russian Church jurisdictions: the Russian Orthodox Church Outside Russia (separated from Moscow Patriarchate until 2007), the parishes under Metropolitan Eulogius (Georgiyevsky) that went under the Ecumenical Patriarchate of Constantinople, and parishes that remained under the Moscow Patriarchate. Berdyaev was among those that chose to remain under the omophorion of the Moscow Patriarchate. He is mentioned by name on the Korsun/Chersonese Diocesan history as among those noted figures who supported the Moscow Patriarchate West-European Eparchy (in France now Korsun eparchy).

Currently, the house in Clamart in which Berdyaev lived, now comprises a small "Berdiaev-museum" and attached Chapel in name of the Holy Spirit, under the omophorion of the Moscow Patriarchate. On 24 March 2018, the 70th anniversary of Berdyaev's death, the priest of the Chapel served panikhida-memorial prayer at the Diocesan cathedral for eternal memory of Berdyaev, and later that day the Diocesan bishop Nestor (Sirotenko) presided over prayer at the grave of Berdyaev.

In recent years, efforts to archive and document Berdyaev's work have expanded. A group of scholars has digitized original, unpublished manuscripts from the Berdiaev-museum in Clamart, France, offering researchers and the public deeper insight into his unpublished writings and correspondence.

== Works ==
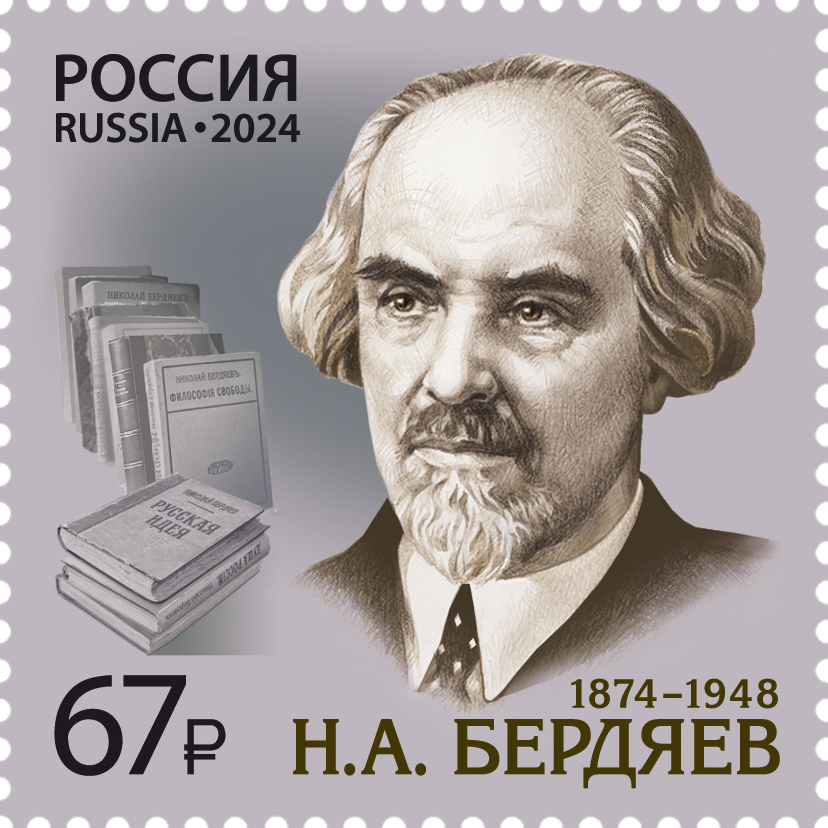
Berdyaev on a 2024 stamp of Russia

In 1901 Berdyaev opened his literary career so to speak by work on Subjectivism and Individualism in Social Philosophy. In it, he analyzed a movement then beginning in Imperial Russia that "at the beginning of the twentieth-century Russian Marxism split up; the more cultured Russian Marxists went through a spiritual crisis and became founders of an idealist and religious movement, while the majority began to prepare the advent of Communism". He wrote "over twenty books and dozens of articles."

The first date is of the Russian edition, the second date is of the first English edition.

- Subjectivism and Individualism in Societal Philosophy (1901)
- The New Religious Consciousness and Society (1907) (Russian: Новое религиозное сознание и общественность, romanized: Novoe religioznoe coznanie i obschestvennost, includes chapter VI "The Metaphysics of Sex and Love")
- Sub specie aeternitatis: Articles Philosophic, Social and Literary (1900–1906) (1907; 2019) ISBN 9780999197929 ISBN 9780999197936
- Vekhi – Landmarks (1909; 1994) ISBN 9781563243912
- The Spiritual Crisis of the Intelligentsia (1910; 2014) ISBN 978-0-9963992-1-0
- The Philosophy of Freedom (1911; 2020) ISBN 9780999197943 ISBN 9780999197950
- Aleksei Stepanovich Khomyakov (1912; 2017) ISBN 9780996399258 ISBN 9780999197912
- "Quenchers of the Spirit" (1913; 1999)
- The Meaning of the Creative Act (1916; 1955) ISBN 978-15973126-2-2
- The Crisis of Art (1918; 2018) ISBN 9780996399296 ISBN 9780999197905
- The Fate of Russia (1918; 2016) ISBN 9780996399241
- Dostoevsky: An Interpretation (1921; 1934) ISBN 978-15973126-1-5
- Oswald Spengler and the Decline of Europe (1922)
- The Meaning of History (1923; 1936) ISBN 978-14128049-7-4
- The Philosophy of Inequality (1923; 2015) ISBN 978-0-9963992-0-3
- The End of Our Time [a.k.a. The New Middle Ages] (1924; 1933) ISBN 978-15973126-5-3
- Leontiev (1926; 1940)
- Freedom and the Spirit (1927–8; 1935) ISBN 978-15973126-0-8
- The Russian Revolution (1931; anthology)
- The Destiny of Man (1931; translated by Natalie Duddington 1937) ISBN 978-15973125-6-1
- Lev Shestov and Kierkegaard N. A. Beryaev 1936
- Christianity and Class War (1931; 1933)
- The Fate of Man in the Modern World (1934; 1935)
- Solitude and Society (1934; 1938) ISBN 978-15973125-5-4
- The Bourgeois Mind (1934; anthology)
- The Origin of Russian Communism (1937; 1955)
- Christianity and Anti-semitism (1938; 1952)
- Slavery and Freedom (1939) ISBN 978-15973126-6-0
- The Russian Idea (1946; 1947)
- Spirit and Reality (1946; 1957) ISBN 978-15973125-4-7
- The Beginning and the End (1947; 1952) ISBN 978-15973126-4-6
- Towards a New Epoch (1949; anthology)
- Dream and Reality: An Essay in Autobiography (1949; 1950) alternate title: Self-Knowledge: An Essay in Autobiography ISBN 978-15973125-8-5
- The Realm of Spirit and the Realm of Caesar (1949; 1952)
- Divine and the Human (1949; 1952) ISBN 978-15973125-9-2
- The Truth of Orthodoxy (1952)
- Truth and Revelation (n.p.; 1953)
- Astride the Abyss of War and Revolutions: Articles 1914–1922 (n.p.; 2017) ISBN 9780996399272 ISBN 9780996399289

Sources

- '"Bibliographie des Oeuvres de Nicolas Berdiaev" établie par Tamara Klépinine' published by the Institut d'études Slaves, Paris 1978
- Berdyaev Bibliography on www.cherbucto.net
- By-Berdyaev Online Articles Index

== See also ==
- Vladimir Soloviev
- Semyon Frank
- Pavel Florensky
- Fyodor Dostoevsky
- Søren Kierkegaard
- List of Russian philosophers
- Nikolai Lossky
- Orthodox Christian theology
- Russian Religious Renaissance
- Vekhi
- Peter Struve
- Nikolai Fyodorov (philosopher)

== Sources ==
- Lowrie, Donald A. (1960). Rebellious Prophet: A Life of Nicolai Berdyaev. New York: Harper & Brothers.
- Vallon, M. A. (1960). An Apostle of Freedom: Life and Teachings of Nicolas Berdyaev. New York: Philosophical Library.
- Chamberlain, Lesley (2007). Lenin's Private War: The Voyage of the Philosophy Steamer and the Exile of the Intelligentsia. New York: St. Martin's Press. ISBN 978-0-312-36730-5.
- Marković, Marko (1978). La Philosophie de l'inégalité et les idées politiques de Nicolas Berdiaev (in French). Paris: Nouvelles Éditions Latines. ISBN 978-2-7233-0027-8.
