= Natalie Duddington =

Russian-British translator and philosopher (1886–1972)

- Born: 14 November 1886; Voronezh, Russia
- Died: 30 May 1972 (aged 85); Haringey, England

Natalie Duddington (née Ertel; 14 November 1886 – 30 May 1972) was a philosopher and a translator of Russian literature into English. Her first name sometimes appears as Nathalie (with an h).

== Biography ==
Nataliya Aleksandrovna Ertel was born in Voronezh on 14 November 1886, to the author Alexander Ertel. She was Ertel's oldest daughter and considered intelligent as a child. When the English translator Constance Garnett visited Ertel in the summer of 1904, she was much impressed by Natalie, who began studying at Saint Petersburg University the following year. When the university was temporarily closed due to student unrest in the 1905 revolution, Garnett encouraged Natalie to come to England. She came to England in 1906 and attended University College London (UCL) on a scholarship, graduating with a first-class degree in philosophy in 1909. At UCL she was a student of the philosopher Dawes Hicks who wrote that she had helped to advance Russian philosophy through her translation of two substantial works of Russian philosophy (by Nikolay Lossky and Semyon Frank).

Through her interest in Theosophy, Natalie met John "Jack" Nightingale Duddington, who had been appointed Rector of Ayot St Lawrence in 1905. He divorced his wife in 1911 and began living with Ertel. She married John; they had two children.

== Translating ==
While in England, Duddington began to assist Constance Garnett, whose eyesight was very poor, in making translations from Russian. Duddington would read her the Russian text, sentence by sentence, and write down the English translation to Constance's dictation. She elucidated difficult passages and provided background information; thus the final version was the result of close collaboration between the two of them. Natalie was one of very few people of whom Constance could say that their minds met, and they became life-long friends.

Duddington greatly admired Dostoyevsky's novels and successfully campaigned for their translation. Heinemann gave Garnett a contract at the end of 1910, and by 1920 they had completed all twelve volumes, about two-and-a-half million words in all. In the end, Garnett translated around seventy Russian literary works, and Duddington was closely involved with about half of them. When Garnett's productivity eased off after 1920, Duddington undertook more than two dozen works by herself. Among the writers that she translated, Nikolai Berdyaev, Semyon Frank, and Nikolay Lossky were intellectuals expelled by the Bolsheviks from Russia in 1922 on what is known as the Philosophers' ships. Lossky was personally known to her: "Through 1920 and 1921, at the height of the famine which killed millions on the lower Volga and thousands in the cities, [the Lossky family] survived only with the help of food parcels sent by . . . Natalie Duddington."

Her partner, Jack, initially helped check that her English was idiomatic; in fact some of her first translations were actually attributed to him. (For instance, in 1908 the Stage Society put on The Bread of Others by Turgenev, "translated by J. Nightingale Duddington" – who at this point knew no Russian.) Richard Freeborn, emeritus Professor of English Literature at the University of London, wrote of Duddington's translation of Oblomov, for instance, that "in its particular sensitivity to the subtlety of Goncharov's Russian, in its liveliness and its elegance, it has about it a freshness of manner that admirably matches the same enduring quality in the original."

Duddington was the first to translate several works by Russian authors into English, including Ivan Goncharov's Oblomov, Mikhail Saltykov-Shchedrin's The Golovlyov Family, and a volume of Anna Akhmatova's Forty-Seven Love Poems. Her obituary in The Times wrote that she deserved "much of the credit for spreading an appreciation of Russian literature in England."

== Philosophy ==
Duddington had an interest in philosophy. In 1916 she, along with philosophers Beatrice Edgell, and Susan Stebbing were some of the first women to be elected to serve on the executive committee of the Aristotelian Society. In 1918 she read a paper on "Our Knowledge of Other Minds" to the Aristotelian Society. It was critically reviewed in an issue of Mind, to which she wrote a considered response: "Do we know other minds mediately or im-mediately?" Duddington considered some of her translations of Russian philosophers her "most worthwhile" work.

== English translations ==
- Vladimir Sergeyevich Solovyov, The Justification of the Good: an essay on moral philosophy. 1918
- Nikolay Onufriyevich Lossky, The Intuitive Basis of Knowledge: an epistemological inquiry. 1919
- Vladimir Grigoryevich Chertkov, The Last Days of Tolstoy. 1922
- Dmitry Sergeyevich Merezhkovsky, December the Fourteenth. 1923
- Dmitry Sergeyevich Merezhkovsky, The Birth of the Gods. 1926
- Semyon Lyudvigovich Frank, God with Us: Three Meditations. 1926
- Dmitry Sergeyevich Merezhkovsky, Akhnaton, King of Egypt. 1927
- Anna Akhmatova, Forty-Seven Love Poems. 1927
- Aleksandr Sergeyevich Pushkin, The Captain’s Daughter and other stories. 1928
- Nikolay Onufriyevich Lossky, The World as an Organic Whole. 1928
- Ivan Goncharov, Oblomov. 1929
- Dmitry Sergeyevich Merezhkovsky, Michael Angelo and Other Sketches. 1930
- Ivan Sozontovich Lukash, The Flames of Moscow. 1930
- Viktor Pavlovich Kin, Over The Border. 1932
- Nikolay Onufriyevich Lossky, Freedom of Will. 1932
- Tatiana Tchernavin, Escape from the Soviets. 1933 ("translated by N. Alexander")
- Tatiana Tchernavin, We, Soviet Women. 1935 ("translated by N. Alexander")
- Nikolai Alexandrovich Berdyaev, The Destiny of Man. 1937
- Boris Konstantinovich Zaytsev, Anna. 1937
- Lev Aleksandrovich Zander, Vision and Action. 1948
- Lev Aleksandrovich Zander, Dostoevsky. 1948
- Ivan Sergeyevich Turgenev, Smoke. 1949
- Vladimir Sergeyevich Solovyov, A Solovyov Anthology 1950
- Mikhail Saltykov-Shchedrin, The Golovlyov Family. 1955
- Alexander Ertel, The Specialist and A Greedy Peasant in Eight Great Russian Short Stories. 1962.
- Reality and Man. 1966.
- Russian Folk Tales from the collection made by Alexander Nikolayevich Afanasyev, 1967
- Vasily Osipovich Klyuchevsky, A Course in Russian History. 1968 (repr. 1994)

== Books edited and/or compiled ==
- A First Russian Reader. 1943
- Intermediate Russian Reader. 1949
- Russian short stories: XIXth century (an "Oxford Russian Reader") 1953
- Lev Nikolaevich Tolstoy, Lev Tolstoy, Selections. 1959
