= Alexander Ertel =

Russian writer (1855–1908)

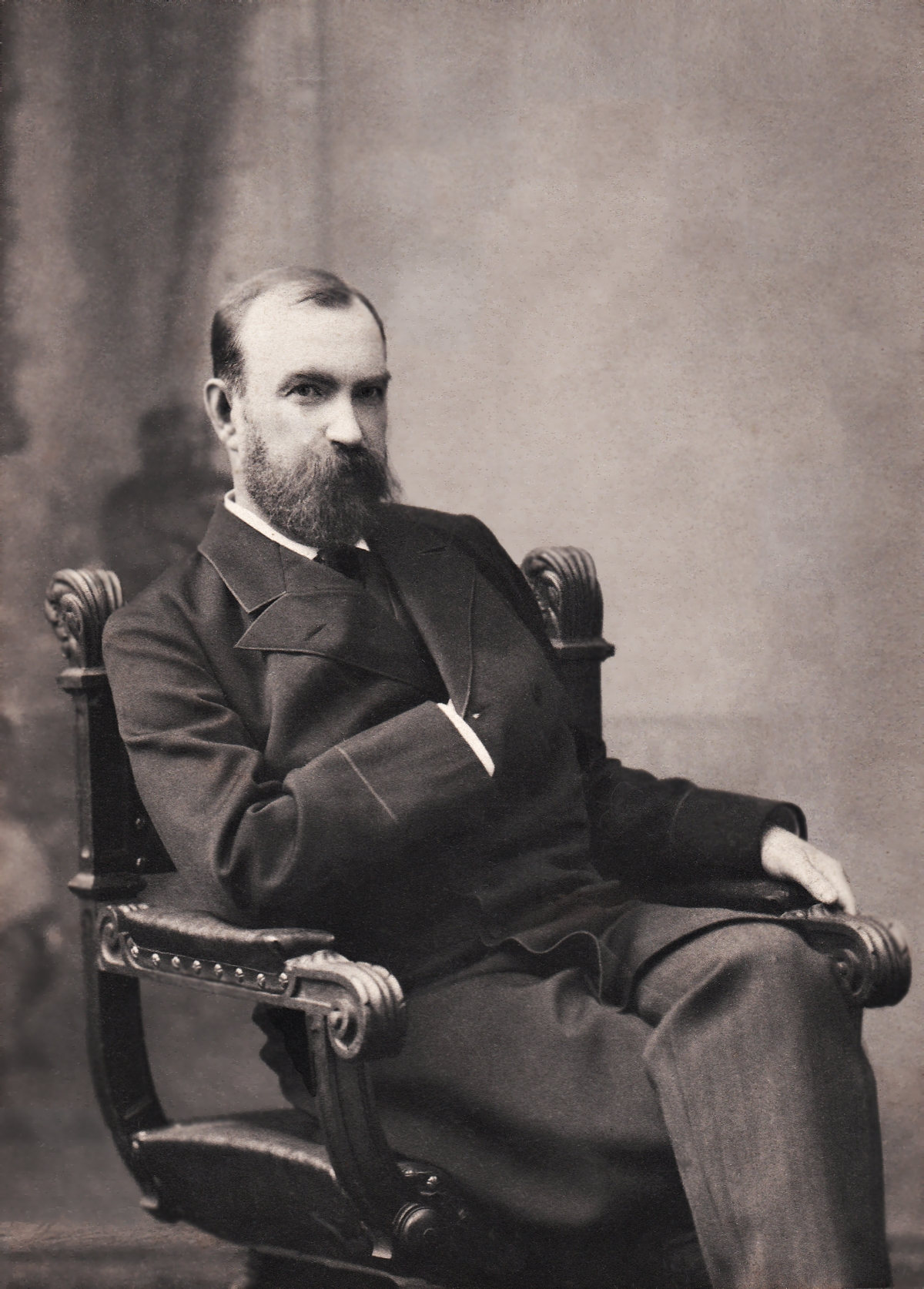
- Born: 19 July 1855; Voronezh, Russia
- Died: 20 February 1908 (aged 52); Moscow, Russia
- Occupations: Novelist; short story writer
- Writing career
- Notable works: "The Specialist", A Greedy Peasant, The Gardenins

Alexander Ivanovich Ertel (Russian: Алекса́ндр Ива́нович Э́ртель; 19 July [O.S. 7 July] 1855 – 20 February [O.S. 7 February] 1908) was a Russian novelist and short story writer.

== Biography ==
Ertel was born near Voronezh, where his father – a soldier in Napoleon's army, captured by the Russians – had settled and become an estate agent. He never completed school, and was largely self-educated. He published his first collection of stories called Notes from the Steppes in 1883. He was imprisoned in 1884 for his revolutionary ties, and afterwards exiled to Tver for four years. He published a number of novellas and stories in the 1880s and 1890s, including A Greedy Peasant (1886), and the two novels The Gardenins (1889), and Change (1891). When The Gardenins was republished in 1908, it featured a preface by Leo Tolstoy, who admired Ertel's work.

After his death, his widow Marya Vasilievna lived in Moscow, taking in paying guests who had come to learn Russian; she was helped by their younger daughter, Elena (Lolya or Lola), who became a literary translator. Their elder daughter also became a literary translator, working in England as Natalie Duddington. Among Madame Ertel's pupils was Bruce Lockhart; in his famous Memoirs of a British Agent (1932) he recorded that, thanks to her and Lolya, he became proficient in Russian, acquired a modicum of culture, and developed a deep affection for all things Russian. Marya died in the typhus epidemic in 1919; Lolya survived it and managed to escape to Britain in 1927.

== Legacy ==
His first stories appeared in 1880 but his best and best-known novel is The Gardenins; Their Retainers, Their Friends, and Their Enemies, in two volumes (1898). It had the honour, when reprinted in 1908, of a preface by Tolstoy. Tolstoy gave especial praise to Értel's art of dialogue. Referring to it, Tolstoy said: "Such good Russian is not to be found in any writer, old or new. He uses the people's speech not only with accuracy, force, and beauty, but with infinite variety... Who wants to know the language of the Russian people... must not only read but study Értel's Russian. Apart from this, The Gardenins is one of the best Russian novels written since the great age. It is a vast panorama of life on a big estate in South Central Russia. The hero is the son of an estate-agent (like Értel himself). The characters of the peasants are infinitely varied, and splendidly individualized. So are those of the rural middle class and of the rural police, which of course is presented in a satirical light. But the Gardenins themselves, one of whom is a "conscience - stricken" aristocrat, are much less happily portrayed. The novel is transfused with a very keen poetical sense of nature. One of the most memorable episodes is the account of a trotting-match at Khrenovaya, which holds its own even by the side of the race scene in Anna Karenina.

— D. S. Mirsky

His story The Specialist, and his novella A Greedy Peasant are available in English translation in Eight Great Russian Short Stories, A Premier Book, Fawcett Publications, 1962. The translator of these two works was his daughter Natalie Duddington, well known for her translations of other Russian authors.

== English translations ==
- Great Russian Short Stories, London, E. Benn Limited, 1929.
- Eight Great Russian Short Stories, A Premier Book, Fawcett Publications, 1962.
- A Greedy Peasant, translated by Natalie Duddington (first published 1929), Zephyr Books, 2020.

== Sources ==
- "Эртель, Александр Иванович" . Brockhaus and Efron Encyclopedic Dictionary (in Russian). 1906.
