= Nikolay Lossky =

Russian philosopher (1870–1965)

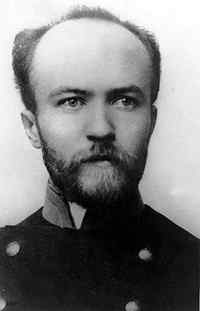
- Born: Nikolay Onufriyevich Lossky; 6 December 1870; Kreslavka, Russian Empire (now Latvia)
- Died: 24 January 1965 (aged 94); Paris, France
- Spouse: Lyudmila Stoyunina (m. 1902; died 1943)
- Children: 4, including Vladimir
- Relatives: Olga Lossky (great-great-granddaughter)

Education
- Education: Imperial Saint Petersburg University
- Academic advisors: G. E. Müller; Wilhelm Windelband; Wilhelm Wundt

Philosophical work
- Era: 20th-century philosophy
- Region: Russian philosophy
- School: Intuitionism; Personalism,
- Institutions: Bestuzhev Courses; Russian People's University; St. Vladimir's Orthodox Theological Seminary
- Main interests: Ethics, Neoplatonism
- Notable ideas: Intuitivist-personalism, gnosiology

Nikolay Onufriyevich Lossky (Note: Russian: Николай Онуфриевич Лосский.) (/ˈlɒski/; 6 December [O.S. 24 November] 1870 – 24 January 1965), was a Russian philosopher, representative of Russian idealism, intuitionist epistemology, personalism, libertarianism, ethics and axiology (value theory). He gave his philosophical system the name intuitive-personalism. He spent his working life in St. Petersburg and, after his exile by the Bolsheviks in 1922, in Prague and New York. He was the father of the influential Christian theologian Vladimir Lossky.

== Life ==
Lossky was born in Kreslavka, then in the Russian Empire. His father, Onufry Lossky, had Belarusian roots (his grandfather was a Greek-Catholic Uniate priest) and was an Eastern Orthodox Christian; his mother Adelajda Przylenicka was Polish and Roman Catholic. He was expelled from school for propagating atheism.

Lossky undertook postgraduate studies in Germany under Wilhelm Windelband, Wilhelm Wundt and G. E. Müller, receiving a master's degree in 1903 and a doctorate in 1907.

Returning to Russia, he became a lecturer and subsequently assistant professor of philosophy in Saint Petersburg.

Lossky called for a Russian religious and spiritual reawakening while pointing out post-revolution excesses. At the same time, Lossky survived an elevator accident that nearly killed him, which caused him to turn back to the Russian Orthodox Church under the direction of Fr. Pavel Florensky. These criticisms and conversion cost Lossky his professorship of philosophy and led to his exile abroad, on the famed Philosophers' ship (in 1922) from the Soviet Union as a counter-revolutionary.

Lossky was invited to Prague by Tomáš Masaryk and became professor at the Russian University of Prague at Bratislava, in Czechoslovakia. Being part of a group of ex-Marxists, including Nikolai Berdyaev, Sergei Bulgakov, Gershenzon, Peter Berngardovich Struve, Semyon Frank, Lossky, though a Fabian socialist, contributed to the group's symposium named Vekhi or Signposts. He also helped the Harvard sociologist Pitirim Sorokin with his Social and Cultural Dynamics

In 1947 N. O. Lossky took a position teaching theology at Saint Vladimir's Orthodox Theological Seminary, an Orthodox Christian seminary then located in New York City.

In 1961, after the death of his famous son, theologian Vladimir Lossky, N. O. Lossky went to France. The last four years of his life were spent in illness there.

== Philosophy ==
=== Intuitivism ===
Lossky was one of the preeminent Russian neo-idealists of his day. Lossky's Гносеология or gnosiology is called Intuitivist-Personalism and had in part adapted the Hegelian dialectical approach of first addressing a problem in thought in terms of its expression as a duality or dichotomy. Once the problem is expressed as a dichotomy the two opposing ideas are fused in order to transcend the dichotomy. This transition is expressed in the concept of sobornost, integrality or mystical communal union. Lossky also followed and developed his ontological and gnosiological interpretation of objective reality from Christian Neoplatonism based on the Patristic Fathers. This along with Origen and the works of Russian mystics Kireevsky and Khomyakov and the later works of V. Solovyov among many others. Understanding and comprehension coming from addressing an object, as though part of the external world, something that joins the consciousness of the perceiving subject directly (noesis, insight), then becoming memory, intuitionism as the foundation of all noema or processes of consciousness. In that human consciousness comprehends the essence or noumena of an object and the object's external phenomenon which are then assembled into a complete organic whole called experience. Much of an object's defining and understanding in consciousness is not derived discursively but rather intuitively or instinctively as an object has no meaning outside of the whole of existence. Lossky summed up this concept in the term "all is immanent in all". As such much of reality as uncreated or uncaused is irrational, or random (see libertarianism below) and can not be validated rationally (i.e. freedom and love as energy are uncaused, uncreated). Therefore, consciousness in its interaction with reality operates not strictly as rational (only partially) much of consciousness operates intuitively. This is intuitively done by the nous. The nous, consciousness or the focal point of the psyche as the "organic connection" to the object and therefore the material world as a whole. The psyche here is the sensory input from the physical body to the inner being, mind or consciousness. This interaction causing different levels of maturing consciousness over time (reinterpretation). As a dynamic retention, experience constitutes the process of learning i.e. reflective differentiation.

=== Phenomenology and axiology ===
Consequently, the existence of objects can not be completely expressed with logic or words, nor validated with knowledge, due to objects having a supernatural essence or substance as their composition (supernatural in an ancient Greek philosophy or Orthodox Christian understanding of supernatural as uncreated or uncaused). Following an Orthodox Christian substance theory (see Gregory Palamas) energy and potential do not have ontology without a sentient agent (i.e. idealism), Lossky coined the term "substantive agent" to validate that matter as well as energy are uncreated in substance, essence. This validation as part of gnosiology or Christian mysticism (Orthodoxy) as opposed to the Russian Materialist and nihilist position that states that objects have no "thing in itself" or no essence, substance behind their phenomenon (as in Positivism). Lossky based his intuitivism on gnosiology in that he taught first principles as uncreated or uncaused. Lossky's Axiology was the teaching of first principles dialectically. Russian philosophy based on Soloviev is expressed metaphysically in that the essence of an object can be akin to Noumenon (opposed to its appearance or phenomenon), but it can have random characteristics to its being or essence, characteristically sumbebekos. This is the basis of V Soloviev's arguments against Positivism which are the cornerstone of Russian philosophy contained in Soloviev's "Against the Positivists". The validation (immediate apprehension) of truth, value and existence all being intuitive as expressed by Aristotle's Noesis. Each event having value or existence because of substantive agents being engaged in the event, (via Neo-idealism) giving the event value and existence.

=== Sobornost and the world as an organic whole ===
One of the main points of Lossky's онтология or ontology is, the world is an organic whole as understood by human consciousness. Intuition, insight (noesis in Greek) is the direct contemplation of objects, and furthermore the assembling of the entire set of cognition from sensory perception into a complete and undivided organic whole, i.e. experience. This expression of consciousness as without thought, raw and uninterpreted by the rational faculty in the mind. Thus the mind's dianoia (rational or logical faculty) in its deficiency, finiteness or inconclusiveness (due to logic's incompleteness) causes the perceived conflict between the objectivism (materialism, external world) and idealism (spiritual, inner experience) forms of philosophy. Where intuitive or instinctual re-action is without rational processing of the rational faculty of the mind. It is outside of comprehension via the dianoia faculty of the mind, consciousness (Nous). Intuition being analogous with instinctual consciousness. Intuition functions without rational or logical thought in its absorption of experience (called contemplation). Rational or logical thought via the dianoia of the nous, then works in reflection as hindsight to organize experience into a comprehensible order i.e. ontology. The memory, knowledge derived from the rationalizing faculty of the mind is called epistemological knowledge. Intuitive knowledge or Gnosis (preprocessed knowledge or uninterpreted) then being made by the logical facility in the mind into history or memory. Intuition rather than a rationalization (also see Henri Bergson whom influenced Lossky) determining factor it manifests as an integral factor of or during an actual conscious experience. Lossky's ontology being consistent with Leibniz's optimism expressed as the Best of all possible worlds in contrast to the pessimism and nihilism of more pro-Western Russian philosophers. Lossky's work is also opposed to the pagan elements of the pagan philosophers that were an influence on his work. In that the logical faculty of the mind was only finite in a temporal sense and will eventually become infinite (by theosis), as such it seeks the infinite rather than opposes it. Lossky believed that philosophy would transcend its rational limits and manifest a mystical understanding of experience. This would include an understanding that encompasses the intuitive, irrational, philosophically (as done in stochastics) rather than the strictly pagan approach of a good deterministic force opposed to an evil irrational indeterminate force. This of course being the teaching of Christian faith as a philosophical principle (called free will) and intrinsic component to conscious existence, one that manifests sobornost in the transcending of the pagan dichotomy of reason versus superstition or determinism versus in-determinism.

=== Knowledge and memory ===
Once knowledge is abstracted from conscious experience it becomes epistemological knowledge and is then stored in an ontological format in the mind (the format itself a priori). The manipulation of memory and or reapplication of memory as knowledge as post-processed knowledge i.e. Epistemology. Lossky's Ontology as an agent's Сущность (the "essence") expressed as being and or becoming is possible as both the person transcends time and space while being closely connected with the whole world, while in this world. Much of Lossky's working out of an ontological theory of knowledge was done in collaboration with his close friend Semen L. Frank.

=== Metaphysical libertarianism ===
Lossky as a metaphysical libertarian taught that all people have uncreated energy (Aristotle) or potential (Plotinus). This being very much inline with the vitalism of his day. Though Lossky did not strictly adhere to vitalism but rather to its predecessor Monadology and its living forces (dynamis) theory. This is to contrast Leibniz's theory of Monadology against Cartesian mind-body dualism. This as a rejection of vitalism in its dualism of mind and body being of different substances. For Lossky's Substantive Agents have potential (dynamis) and they can act (beings have energy) upon, from this potential. All power or potential comes from the individual. That spontaneous or organic reality structures or orders itself to reconcile opposing forces (sobornost), doing so while maintaining order and freewill. Each pole of existence (the created and uncreated of gnosiology) or opposing ideologies, reaching compromise through value and existence and manifesting in a complete organic whole (sobornost).

Second Section: That selection is the agent's free act. Consequently, the temporal order of events is not uniform even in the inorganic nature. It is quite possible that although some two electrons have millions of time repulsed each other, they will not do so the next time. But functional connections between ideal forms conditioning the existence of the world as a system – e.g. mathematical principles and the laws of the hierarchy of values and their significance for conduct conditioning the presence of meaning in the world – are independent of the agents' will. Violation of these laws is unthinkable, but they do not destroy the agent's freedom: they merely create the possibility of activity as such and of its value. Those laws condition the cosmic structure within the frame work of which there is freedom for an infinite variety of activities. The system of spatiotemporal and numerical forms provides room for activities that are opposed to one another in direction, value, and significance for the world. The absence of rigidly uniform connection between events does not make science impossible. It is sufficient for science that there should be more or less regular connection between events in time. The lower the agent's stage of development, the more uniform are their manifestations. In those cases there may be statistical laws. Many misunderstandings of the doctrine of free will are disposed of by distinguishing between formal and material freedom. Formal freedom means that in each given case an agent may refrain from some particular manifestation and replace it by another. That freedom is absolute and cannot be lost under any circumstance. Material freedom means the degree of creative power possessed by an agent, and finds expression in what he is capable of creating. It is unlimited in the Kingdom of God, the members of which unanimously combine their forces for communal creativeness and even derive help from God's omnipotence. But agents outside the Kingdom of God are in a state of spiritual deterioration and have very little material freedom, though their formal freedom is unimpaired. Life outside the Kingdom of God is the result of the wrong use of free will.

— From History of Russian Philosophy section on N. Lossky in chapter on Intuitivists p. 260.

Lossky's argument that determinism can not account for the cause of energy in the Universe. Energy being a substance that can not be created or destroyed (see the law of conservation of energy). Each agent accounting for their existence as their own dynamistic manifestation. Dynamistic manifestation as being that of act or energy derived from a Neoplatonic interpretation.

First section: Determinists deny freedom of the will on the ground that every event has a cause. They mean by causality the order of temporal sequence of one event after other events and the uniformity of that sequence. Causation, generation, creation and all other dynamic aspects of causality are ruled out. Lossky proves that the will is free, taking as his starting point the law of causality but defending a dynamistic interpretation of it. Every event arises not out of itself, but is created by someone: it cannot be created by other events: having a temporal form events fall away every instant into the realm of the past and have no creative power to generate the future. Only supertemporal substantival agents – i.e., actual and potential personalities – are bearers of creative power: they create events as their own vital manifestations. According to the dynamistic interpretation of causality it is necessary to distinguish among the conditions under which an event takes place the cause from the occasion of its happening. The cause is always the substantival agent himself as the bearer of creative power, and the other circumstances are merely occasions for its manifestations, which are neither forced nor predetermined by them. The agents' creative power is superqualitative and does not therefore predetermine which particular values an agent will select as his final end. From History of Russian Philosophy section on N. Lossky in chapter on Intuitivists p. 260.

== Theology and Neoplatonism ==
Much of the theology that Lossky covers (as his own) in the book History of Russian Philosophy is inline with the idealism of Origen. Lossky's idealism is based on Origen's. In that the relationship between the mystic, religious understanding of God and a philosophical one there have been various stages of development in the history of the Roman East. The nous as mind (rational and intuitive understanding) in Greek Christian philosophy is given the central role of understanding only when it is placed or reconciled with the heart or soul of the person. Earlier versions of Christian and Greek philosophical syncretism are in modern times referred to as Neoplatonic. An example of this can be seen in the works of Origen and his teaching on the nous as to Origen, all souls pre-existed with their Creator in a perfect, spiritual (non-material) state as "nous," that these minds then fell away so to pursue an individual and independent existence apart from God. Because all beings were created with absolute freedom and free will, God, not being a tyrant, would not force his creations to return to Him. According to Origen, God's infinite love and respect for His creatures allowed for this. Instead, God created the material world, universe or cosmos. God then initiated the aeons or history. God did this for the purpose of, through love and compassion, guiding his creations back to contemplation of His infinite, limitless mind. This was according to Origen, the perfect state. Though the specifics of this are not necessarily what Lossky taught in his theology courses, since dogma in a general sense, is what is taught as theology. N. O. Lossky also was inline with the common distinctions of Orthodox Christian theology. Like the Essence-Energies distinction for example. Though Lossky did pursue a position of reconciliation based on mutual cooperation between East and West. Lossky taught this co-operation as organic and or spontaneous order, integrality, and unity called sobornost. Sobornost can also be translated to mean catholic.

== Influence ==
In biographical reminiscences recorded in the early 1960s, philosophical novelist and Objectivism founder Ayn Rand recalled only Lossky among her teachers at the University of Petrograd or University of St. Petersburg, reporting that she studied classical philosophy with him prior to his removal from his teaching post by the Soviet regime.

N.O. Lossky also influenced the theologian-philosopher, Professor Joseph Papin, whose work Doctrina De Bono Perfecto, Eiusque Systemate N.O. Losskij Personalistico Applicatio (Leiden: E.J. Brill, 1946) was listed among the 100 leading scholarly works of the 20th Century. Papin's volume is the most profound study of Lossky's work in relation to Christian teachings in Roman Catholicism and Eastern Orthodoxy. After teaching at the University of Notre Dame, Papin founded the Theology Institute at Villanova University. He edited publications from the first six symposia (1968–1974). The idea of Sobornost was prominent in the VI volume: The Church and Human Society at the Threshold of the Third Millennium (Villanova University Press, 1974). His own in depth scholarly contribution was entitled: "From Collegiality and Sobornost to Church Unity." The Dean of Harvard Divinity School, Krister Stendahl, gave his highest praise to Papin for his efforts in overcoming the divisions separating Christians: "It gladdens me that you will be honored at the time of having completed a quarter century of teaching us all. Your vision of and your dogged insistence on a truly catholic i.e. ecumenical future of the church and theology has been one of the forces that have broken through the man-made walls of partition. . ." [Transcendence and Immanence, Reconstruction in the Light of Process Thinking, ed. Joseph Armenti, St. Meinrad: The Abbey Press, 1972, p. 5). At the time of his death, United States President Ronald Reagan along with theologians, philosophers, poets, and dignitaries from around the world wrote to Dr. Joseph Armenti praising the life and work of Reverend Joseph Papin. See: “President Reagan Leads International Homage to Fr. Papin in Memorial,” JEDNOTA, 1983, p. 8).

N.O. Lossky also influenced philosophical thought in Latvia during the 1920s and 1930s. His reflections on substance were cited by Pauls Dāle (1889–1968), professor of philosophy at the University of Latvia. N.O. Lossky also maintained friendly relations with Pēteris Zālīte (1864–1939), one of the first Latvian philosophers.

== Quotes ==
From the introduction of Value and Existence:

Due to the tradition of the Church, Russia had an implicit philosophy, a philosophy that was born of the Neoplatonism of the Church Fathers. This implicit Neo-platonism is the true heritage of Russian thinking.

All is immanent in all.

== Selected bibliography ==
- The Fundamental Doctrines of Psychology from the Point of View of Voluntarism «Фундаментальные Доктрины Психологии с Точки зрения Волюнтаризма»(1903)
- The Intuitive Basis of Knowledge «Обоснование интуитивизма»(1906)
- "Недостатки гносеологiи Бергсона и влiянiе ихъ на его метафизику" (1913) (English translation by Frederic Tremblay, "The Defects of Bergson's Epistemology and Their Consequences on His Metaphysics", 2017)
- "Мир как органическое целое" (1917) (English translation by Natalie Duddington, The World as an Organic Whole, 1928)
- The Fundamental Problems of Epistemology «Основные вопросы гносеологии» (1919)
- Logics (1923) (German translation 1927)
- The Foundation of Intuition (1923)
- Свобода воли (1927) (English translation by Natalie Duddington, Freedom of Will, 1932)
- L'Intuition, la Matiere et la Vie (1928)
- "Ученiе Лейбница о перевоплощенiи какъ метаморфозѣ" (1931) (English translation by Frederic Tremblay, "Leibniz's Doctrine of Reincarnation as Metamorphosis", 2020 )
- "Ценность и существование" (1931) (on Axiology) by N. O. Lossky and J. S. Marshall (English translation, Value and Existence, 1935)
- Dialectical Materialism in the U.S.S.R. «Диалектический Материализм в СССР» (1934)
- "Tpaнcцeндeнтaльнo-фeнoмeнoлoгичecкiй идeaлизмъ Гyccepля" (1939) (English translation by Frederic Tremblay & Maria Cherba, "Husserl's Transcendental-Phenomenological Idealism", 2016 )
- "Чувственная, интеллектуальная и мистическая интуиция" (1938) (English translation, Sensuous, intellectual and mystical intuition, 1941)
- Intellectual Intuition, Ideal Existence and Creative Activity «Интеллектуальная интуиция и идеальное бытие, творческая активность» (1941)
- Mystical Intuition «Мистическая интуиция» (1941)
- Evolution and Ideal Life «Эволюция и идеальное бытие» (1941)
- God and Suffering «Бог и всемирное зло» (1941)
- Absolute Good «Условия абсолютного добра»(1944)
- Les Conditions de la Morale Absolue (1949)
- History of Russian Philosophy «История русской Философии»(1951)
  - History of Russian Philosophy (1952)
- The World as the Realization of Beauty «Мир как осуществление красоты»(1945)
- Dostoevsky and his Christian Understanding of the World «Достоевский и его христианское мировоззрение»(1953)
- Popular introduction to philosophy [in Russian] (1957)
- The Character of the Russian people [in Russian] (1957)

== See also ==
- Fyodor Dostoevsky
- Georgy Chulkov
- Mikhail Epstein
- Ammonius Saccas
- List of Russian Philosophers
- Heuristic
- theophilos – Love of God
- Georges Florovsky
- John Meyendorff
- Alexander Schmemann
- Subjective idealism
- Objective idealism
- Philosophers' ship
- Panpsychism
- Subjunctive possibility
- Phenomenology
- Voluntarism
- Gestalt psychology
- Cognitive psychology
- Perceptual psychology
- Demiurge as the consciousness (nous), creative energy (urge), in mankind.
- Eastern Orthodox – Roman Catholic theological differences
- Eastern Orthodox – Roman Catholic ecclesiastical differences
