= Gnosiology =

Branch of philosophy

Gnosiology ("study of knowledge") is "the philosophy of knowledge and cognition". In Soviet and post-Soviet philosophy, as well as in other contexts, the word is often used as a synonym for epistemology. The term is also currently used in regard to Eastern Christianity. The philosopher Franz Brentano called his descriptive psychology psychognosy (traced back to 1880-81). According to the philosopher Nicolai Hartmann gnoseology is to be distinguished sharply from ontology.

== Etymology ==
The term is derived from the Ancient Greek words gnosis ("knowledge", γνῶσις) and logos ("word" or "discourse", λόγος). Linguistically, one might compare it to epistemology, which is derived from the Greek words episteme ("certain knowledge") and logos.

The term "gnosiology" is not well known today, although found in Baldwin's (1906) Dictionary of Psychology and Philosophy. The Encyclopædia Britannica (1911) remarks that "The term Gnosiology has not, however, come into general use."

The term "gnosiology" (Modern Greek: γνωσιολογία) is used more commonly in Modern Greek than in English. As a philosophical concept, gnosiology broadly means the theory of knowledge, which in ancient Greek philosophy was perceived as a combination of sensory perception and intellect and then made into memory (called the mnemonic system). When considered in the context of science, gnosiology takes on a different meaning: the study of knowledge, its origin, processes, and validity. Gnosiology being the study of types of knowledge, i.e. memory (abstract knowledge derived from experimentation being "episteme" or teachable knowledge), experience induction (or empiricism), deduction (or rationalism), scientific abductive reasoning, contemplation (theoria), metaphysical and instinctual or intuitive knowledge. Gnosiology is focused on the study of the noesis and noetic components of human ontology.

Within gnosiology, gnosis is derived by noesis. Noesis refers to the experiences or activities of the nous. This makes the study and origin of gnosis and gnosiology the study of the intuitive and or instinctual.

== Philosophy and Western esotericism ==
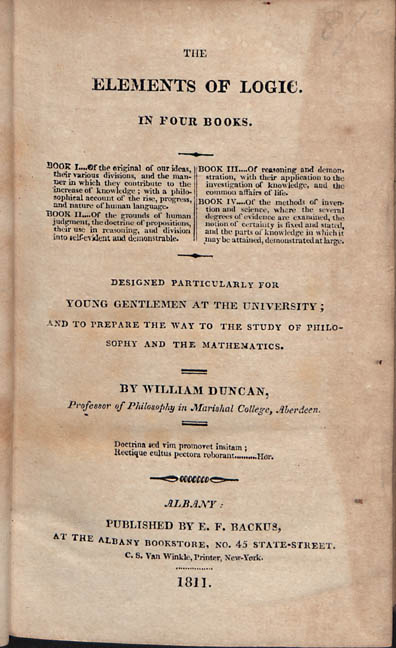
In The Elements of Logic (1811), William Duncan combined a Lockean theory of knowledge with syllogistic logic.

In philosophy, gnosology (also known as gnoseology or gnostology) literally means the study of gnosis, meaning knowledge or esoteric knowledge. The study of gnosis itself covers a number of subjects, which include magic, noetics, gnostic logic, and logical gnosticism, among others. Gnosology has also been used, particularly by James Hutchison Stirling, to render Johann Gottlieb Fichte's term for his own version of transcendental idealism, Wissenschaftslehre, meaning "Doctrine of Knowledge".

The so-called "intellectus ectypus" derives its knowledge of objects from intuitions of things-in-themselves without the forms of intuition while the "intellectual archetypus" creates the objects of its knowledge through the act of thinking them. Emilii Medtner drew from Kant's gnosology along with the Kantian theory of knowledge to respond to Carl Jung's Zofingia Lectures, particularly to criticize the way intuition was conceived as a knowledge organ that is capable of functioning with validity and independence.

== See also ==
- Aseity
- Epistemology
- Nikolay Lossky
- George Metallinos
