= John Sedberry Marshall =

American theologian

John Sedberry Marshall (May 25, 1898 – 1979) was an American scholar whose works focused on topics related to the United States Episcopal Church; he authored studies on the theology of William Porcher DuBose and Richard Hooker.

== Early life and career ==
He was born in Fullerton, California and educated at Pomona College (where he graduated with a BA in 1921) and Boston University (where he gained his PhD in 1926). Marshall was the professor of philosophy at Albion College from 1926 until 1946 and professor of philosophy at the University of the South in Sewanee, Tennessee from 1946 until 1968. He was also editor of the Anglican Theological Review during 1959–1965.

== Writings ==
In 1949 Marshall's book on the theology of William Porcher DuBose, The Word Was Made Flesh, was published by the University of the South Press with an introduction by the late Episcopal bishop of New York City, William T. Manning. Norman Pittenger appraised the work as a "convenient, logically developed outline of the whole philosophical-theological view of Du Bose".

Marshall's 1956 work, Hooker's Theology of Common Prayer, is a guide to Richard Hooker's fifth book of his Of the Lawes of Ecclesiastical Politie. In his review, Massey H. Shepherd said it was "nothing less than an up-to-date apology for the Book of Common Prayer" and "an outstanding example of how old classics can be made to speak in contemporary accents to living issues of theology".

In 1963, Marshall composed a fuller treatment of Hooker's theology in Hooker and the Anglican Tradition: An Historical and Theological Study on Hooker's Ecclesiastical Polity. Marshall argued that Hooker in his Of the Lawes of Ecclesiastical Politie only aimed to refute the Puritans in Books II–V, i–xlix and VI, and that Books I, V, l–lxxxi, VII–VIII were intended as a Summa Theologiae modelled on Thomas Aquinas and in which Hooker imitated Aristotle's method of continual discourse.

== Personal life ==
Marshall married Elizabeth Southard on May 26, 1923, and they had one son.

== Works ==
=== Books ===
- Existence and Value, co-authored with Nikolay Lossky (London: George Allen and Unwin, 1935).
- The Genius and Mission of the Episcopal Church (Philadelphia: Church Historical Society, 1949).
- The Word Was Made Flesh: The Theology of William Porscher DuBose, introduction by William T. Manning (Sewanee, Tennessee: University Press at the University of the South, 1949).
- Hooker's Theology of Common Prayer: The Fifth Book of the Polity Paraphrased and Expanded into a Commentary on the Prayer Book (Sewanee, Tennessee: University Press at the University of the South, 1956).
- Hooker and the Anglican Tradition: An Historical and Theological Study on Hooker's Ecclesiastical Polity (London: Adam & Charles Black, 1963).

=== Articles ===
- 'Logic and Language', The Monist, Vol. 40, No. 3 (July 1930), pp. 453–461.
- 'From Aristotle to Christ: Or The Philosophy of William Porcher DuBose', The Sewanee Review, Vol. 51, No. 1 (January – March 1943), pp. 148–159.
- 'Richard Hooker and the Anglo-Saxon Ideal', The Sewanee Review, Vol. 52, No. 3 (Summer 1944), pp. 381–392.
- 'Aristotle and the Agrarians', The Review of Politics, Vol. 9, No. 3 (July 1947), pp. 350–361.
- 'Art and Aesthetic in Aristotle', The Journal of Aesthetics and Art Criticism, Vol. 12, No. 2 (December 1953), pp. 228–231.
