= Semyon Frank =

Russian philosopher (1877–1950)

Semyon Ludvigovich Frank
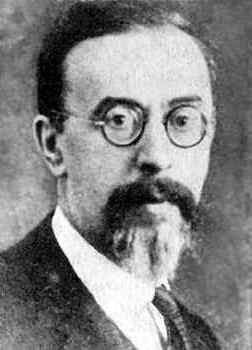
- Born: Semyon Ludvigovich Frank; 28 January 1877; Moscow, Moskovsky Uyezd, Moscow Governorate, Russian Empire
- Died: 10 December 1950 (aged 73); London, United Kingdom

Philosophical work
- Era: 20th-century philosophy
- Region: Russian philosophy
- School: Christian mysticism, Christian philosophy

Semyon Lyudvigovich Frank (Russian: Семён Лю́двигович Франк; 28 January 1877 – 10 December 1950) was a Russian philosopher. Born into a Jewish family, he became an Orthodox Christian in 1912. In 1922 he was expelled from Soviet Russia and lived in Berlin. In 1933 he was replaced as head of the Russian Scientific Institute. In 1945, he moved to Britain.

== Early life and studies ==
Semyon Lyudvigovich Frank was born in Russia in 1877, in Moscow, in a Jewish family. His father, a doctor, died when the boy was young, and he was brought up by his maternal grandfather, M. Rossiansky, an Orthodox Jew, who taught him Hebrew and took him to the synagogue. Through his stepfather, the populist V.I. Zak, he was introduced to the works of N.K. Mikhailovsky and other revolutionaries.

At secondary school he became interested in Marxism. In 1894 he began to study law at Moscow University, but spent more time preaching socialism to the workers, but by 1896 he found Marxist economic theories unsatisfactory, though he remained a socialist. In 1899 he wrote a revolutionary pamphlet which got him expelled from Moscow; so he completed his studies of philosophy and political economy in Berlin. In 1900 he published in Russian a Critique of Marx's theory of value. In 1901 he returned to Russia and received his bachelor's degree at the University of Kazan. Thereafter philosophy became his main preoccupation.

== Career as philosopher ==
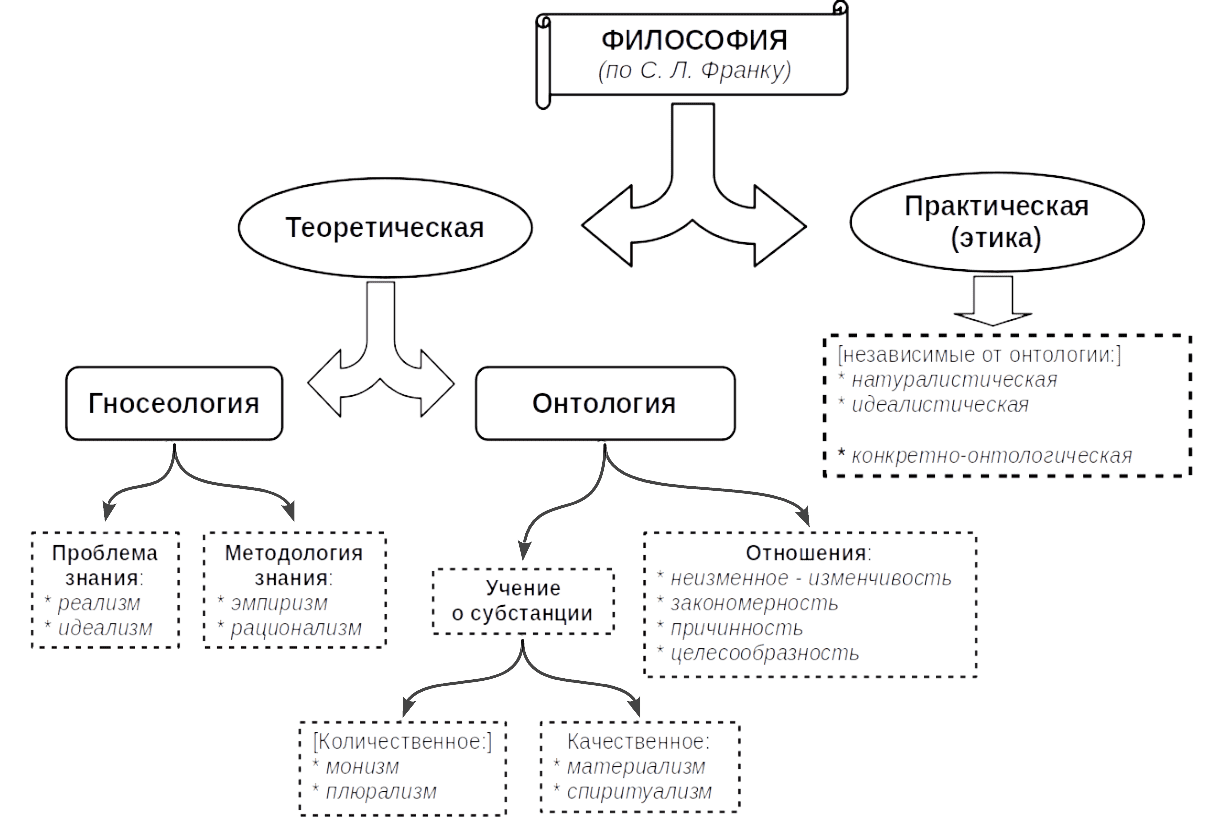

In 1901 Peter Berngardovich Struve invited Frank to contribute to his collection, The Problem of Idealism (published in 1902), which criticised materialism and positivism. He spent the next five years between Moscow and Germany, writing and translating philosophical works and assisting Struve. Between 1902 and 1905, he contributed to Struve's periodical, Osvobozhdenie ('Liberation'), published in Stuttgart (1902–1904) and Paris (1904–1905). In 1906 he moved to St Petersburg and contributed philosophical essays to Struve's periodical, Russkaya Mysl. In 1908, he contributed to the influential symposium, Vekhi ('signposts').

In 1908, he married Tatyana Sergeevna Bartseva (1886–1984) with whom he would have four children: Alexei (1910–1969), Natalia (1912–1999), Vasiliy (1920–1996) and Victor.

In 1912, he converted to Orthodox Christianity, and began lecturing on philosophy at St Petersburg University. Later, he wrote, "I consider my Christianity as the completion of my Old Testament upbringing, as an organic evolution based on the religious foundations which I accepted in my childhood".

Frank spent 1913–1914 in Germany, where he wrote Der Gegenstand des Wissens ('The Object of Knowledge') for which he received his master's degree (1916). It was followed by his Dusha Cheloveka ('Man's Soul') (1917).

In summer 1917, Frank was appointed dean of the arts faculty of the new University of Saratov. In 1921, he was appointed to the chair of philosophy in Moscow University. There he joined the philosopher Nikolai Berdyaev, who was directing the Free Academy of Spiritual Culture.

On 29 September 1922 some 160 prominent intellectuals and their families were expelled (at their own expense and not return without the permission of the Soviet authorities) on a so-called "philosophers' ship" from Petrograd to Stettin, where they arrived on 2 October.

Frank spent the rest of life supported by the World Council of Churches and his friend Ludwig Binswanger who was one of the most famous psychiatrists in the world. Since the 1930s, cooperation with ecumenical journals and organizations became increasingly important for Frank. In December 1931 he was elected as head of the Russian Scientific Institute (RSI) in Berlin. On 7 April 1933, the Law for the Restoration of the Professional Civil Service required an Aryan certificate from all employees and officials in the public sector, including education. His Jewish ancestry rendered him unemployable in Germany. For a couple of months he was succeeded by Ivan Ilyin and then by Adolf Ehrt. In January 1936 Frank stopped collaborating with the Kantian Society. Fleeing the Nazi persecution, he moved to Paris in 1937. During his exile, he published several books and articles in Russian and articles in German, French and one in Dutch "De Russische Wereldbeschouwing" (1932). According to Willem Adolph Visser 't Hooft he was a great authority on religion and metaphysics.

He and his wife survived World War II by hiding near Grenoble; thanks to the intercession of J.R.R. Tolkien, the Russian philosopher received a scholarship from the World Council of Churches. Their four children escaped to Britain. In the early years of the war he wrote 'God With Us', the first of his works to be translated into English (published in 1946). In 1945, he and his wife moved to Britain. Frank died of lung cancer (?) in London. He and his wife are buried in Hendon Cemetery in London.

== Metaphysical libertarianism ==
Semyon Frank's philosophy was based on the ontological theory knowledge. This means that knowledge was intuitive in whole but also logically abstract; logic being limited to only part of being. Frank taught that existence was being but also becoming. As becoming, one has dynamic potential. Thus one's future is indeterminate since reality is both rational and irrational. As reality includes the unity of rationality and irrationality i.e. of necessity and freedom. Frank's position was for the existence of free will.

== Bibliography ==
- Vekhi [Landmarks] (1907)
- Der Gegenstand des Wissens. Grundlagen und Grenzen der begrifflichen Erkenntnis [Knowledge. Principles and Limitations of Conceptual Perception] (1915) (French translation, 'La Connaissance et l'etre', 1937)
- Dusha Cheloveka (1917) (English tr., 'Man's Soul', 1993)
- The Methodology of the Social Sciences (1921) [in Russian]
- Vvedenie v philosophiyu (i.e. 'Introduction to Philosophy') (1922)
- Zhivoe znanie (1923)
- Krushenie kumirov [i.e. 'The Downfall of idols'] (1924)
- Religion and Science [in Russian] (1924)
- Smysl zhizni (1926) (English tr., 'The Meaning of Life', 2010)
- The Basis of Marxism [in Russian] (1926)
- Die geistigen Grundlagen der Gesellschaft (1930) [also in Russian] (English tr., 'The Spiritual foundations of society', 1987)
- Realität und Mensch [Reality and Mankind]
- Nepostizimoe (i.e. 'The Unfathomable') (1939) (English tr., 'The unknowable: an ontological introduction to the philosophy of religion', 1983)
- God With Us: Three Meditations ... Translated from the Russian by Natalie Duddington (1946)
- Light and Darkness: Experience of Christian Ethics and Social Philosophy [in Russian] (1949) (English tr., 'Light shineth in darkness', 1989)
- V. Solovyev: an anthology (1950)
- Reality and man (1956)

== See also ==
- Nikolai Lossky
- Philosophers' ship
- Russian philosophy
