= John Scott (writer) =

American writer (1912–1976)

- Scott in 1940
- Born: John Scott Nearing; March 26, 1912; Philadelphia, Pennsylvania, United States
- Died: December 1, 1976 (aged 64); Chicago, Illinois, United States
- Occupations: Writer, tradesman, journalist, editor, lecturer
- Spouse: Maria (Masha) Ivanovna Dikareva Scott (m. 1933; until his death in 1976)
- Children: Elka (1935); Elena (1939)
- Relatives: Scott Nearing (father); Helen Nearing (stepmother)
- Writing career
- Notable work: Behind the Urals: An American Worker in Russia's City of Steel.

John Scott (1912–1976) was an American writer. He spent about a decade in the Soviet Union from 1932 to 1941. His best-known book, Behind the Urals: An American Worker in Russia's City of Steel, is a memoir of that experience. The bulk of his career was as a journalist, book author, and editor with Time Life.

Scott began his adult life as an idealistic democratic socialist, and traveled to the Soviet Union in 1932 to be part of the early Soviet zeitgeist of enthusiastically building socialism. He worked as a welder, chemist, and foreman at the new city of Magnitogorsk and married and had children there. He was disillusioned in 1937 and 1938 by the Great Purge, which removed him from normal Soviet life as a suddenly distrusted foreigner and which disappeared many of his Russian colleagues. In the late 1930s and early 1940s, he remained sympathetic to socialist ideals but had soured on Stalinism as the path for socialist development, although he believed that the Soviet economy was succeeding in raising the standard of living of the populace and that the Soviet regime would endure as long as that remained true. He moved back to the United States with his family and published his book about his Soviet experience. He worked in the Office of Strategic Services (OSS) during World War II. After the war, he was a journalist with Time magazine for several decades. He published various other books. In later years he publicly advocated against Bolshevism. After his retirement in 1973, he served as vice president of Radio Free Europe/Radio Liberty for several years.

== Background ==
Scott was born as John Scott Nearing in 1912, the son of Scott Nearing, an American radical, and Nearing's first wife, Nellie Marguerite Seeds Nearing. At age 17 or 18 years, John changed his name to John Scott; Stephen Kotkin, who edited a republishing of Scott's memoir, said that this was "to secure his own identity and independence". A 1989 New York Times book review said:

In 1931, John Scott dropped out of the University of Wisconsin, itchy with wanderlust and disenchanted by the misery of the American Depression... he took a welding course and embarked for Russia to help Joseph Stalin build a steel mill in Magnitogorsk... As a foreigner and a gung-ho Communist, Scott [was well treated and had] freedom to travel widely in a region little visited by outsiders. He learned Russian, enrolled in the party university, married a Russian woman [Masha]. Yet in the end he fell victim to [Stalin's] growing xenophobia. Shunned at the plant, he moved to Moscow, where he waited four years for permission to take his wife out of the country... Some years after returning home in 1941, he became a devout anti-Communist missionary. Until his death in 1976, he traveled the world as a Time-Life editor and business consultant, preaching that a dangerously inhumane system lurked behind the seeming allures of Communism.

== Soviet experience ==
=== Magnitogorsk years ===
After leaving the University of Wisconsin in 1931 and getting some welding apprentice training at the General Electric plant in Schenectady, New York, Scott migrated to the Soviet Union in September 1932 at the age of 20. He worked for 5 years in the new industrial city Magnitogorsk at an iron and steel plant. Most of his book is a memoir of his life and work experiences from 1932 to 1937.

Returning from a vacation in late 1937, he found that the purge had "made astonishing headway" in only a few months and that, as a foreigner, he was no longer allowed into the plant. He talked with a fellow foreman and longtime friend, Kolya, who concluded: "Better leave. This is no place for foreigners now." He and his wife, Maria (Masha) Ivanovna Dikareva Scott, decided that night to leave. The next day Masha applied for permission to go to the United States to live, which would turn out to take four years to come through. After three months of waiting while unemployed, Scott left Magnitogorsk for Moscow, planning to seek work as a translator or a secretary to a foreign journalist. In 1942, the family moved to America, an outcome that took help from the U.S. embassy to come about. Scott came close to being a purge victim; he stated that if he had switched citizenship during his good Soviet years, as some other foreign-born socialists had, he would have been sent, like them, into Siberian labor camps. This theme (differing fates for foreign-born residents depending on citizenship status by the time of the purge) is also confirmed in Robert Robinson's memoir.

Scott wrote Behind the Urals: An American Worker in Russia's City of Steel about his experiences in Magnitogorsk, presenting the Stalinist enterprise of building a huge steel producing plant and city as an awe-inspiring triumph of collectivism. Scott contributed to the construction of Magnitogorsk as a welder working in treacherous conditions. His writing reflects the painful human price of industrial accidents, overwork, and the inefficiency of the hyperindustrialization program, the wretched condition of peasants driven from the land in the collectivization program and forced into becoming industrial laborers, and the harshness of Article 58 in the ideological purges.

In Behind the Urals Scott recalls many examples of the danger workers faced in Magnitogorsk:

I was just going to start welding when I heard someone sing out, and something swished down past me. It was a rigger who had been working on the very top. He bounced off the bleeder pipe, which probably saved his life. Instead of falling all the way to the ground, he landed on the main platform about fifteen foot below me. By the time I got down to him, blood was coming out of his mouth in gushes. He tried to yell, but could not.

According to Scott, Stalin chose to industrialize Magnitogorsk for several reasons, and integrated the construction of Magnitogorsk into a five-year economic plan. First, Stalin began to emphasize industrial modernization in favor of agriculture by the mid-1930s. Second, Magnitogorsk was rich in iron ore and other minerals. Lastly, and perhaps most importantly, Magnitogorsk lies far from any borders and was less vulnerable to enemy attack.

The Russian people shed blood, sweat, and tears to create something else, a modern industrial base outside the reach of an invader—Stalin's Ural Stronghold—and modern mechanized army...the population was taught by a painful and expensive process to work efficiently, to obey orders, to mind their own business, and to take it on the chin when necessary with a minimum of complaint. These are the things that it takes to fight a modern war.

These experiences, however, had not yet disillusioned Scott with the Communist Party of the Soviet Union (CPSU), which he believed was "the source of initiative and energy which drove work forward." Scott expressed a deep sense of pride for his contributions as a welder in Magnitogorsk and was sympathetic to many Soviet ideals. Reflecting back on the poor working conditions, loss of life, and ideological purges, Scott explained that many average Soviet citizens saw moral value nonetheless in the Soviet alternative to the exploitative imperial default that would otherwise exist. To them "it was worthwhile to shed blood, sweat, and tears" to lay "the foundations for a new society farther along the road of human progress than anything in the West; a society which would guarantee its people not only personal freedom but absolute economic security." However, after leaving Magnitogorsk in 1938, Scott spent the next 3 years in Moscow as an "observer", waiting for the visa allowing him to bring his wife and children out of the USSR, and although his book as published in 1942 showed that he had abiding sympathy with the ideals of the Soviet experiment, by February 1938 in his then-classified debriefing by the U.S. embassy, he had already reached a private dread that "the future of the Soviet Union does not look bright to me." It is clear that he still sympathized with socialist ideals but had found Stalinism and the purge to be a wrong turn away from them. He said, "Unless the Party is restored to at least some of its former position as a leading force in the country and permitted to propagate certain basic socialist principles, there will be no cement to prevent demoralization and breakdown, no ideology to act as a religion or faith for youth." This was an accurate prediction, although the loss of zeal would take another half century to fully develop, long after chekism had displaced progressive idealism as the real driving force of the party. Even on the same page from 1942 on which he credited the CPSU with getting things done economically, he described Stalin's leadership as full of "ruthlessness and cold, colorless dogmatism." However, he saw most of the populace as focused solely on rising standard of living, which he saw had in fact occurred in the 1930s, and he said even in his private 1938 debriefing that "I believe that the economic battle is gradually being won." He said, "I believe that the popular feeling in the Urals is that the present regime has given them [the common people], and is giving them, more goods and comforts than they have had before. It is possible that as long as the Soviet regime is able to keep the people at work and give them enough purchasing power to buy the things essential to their low standards it will endure." The "low standards" part of his statement is significant in fully understanding it. As Manya Gordon showed in 1941, the overall arc of Russian standard of living from the 1910s through the 1930s was not at all what it should have been if a brutal civil war and forced collectivization had not happened at all, but given that those things did in fact happen, it was possible, among those people who had not been imprisoned, starved to death, or shot, to see improvement in 1938—relative to the deranged baseline of how horrible things had gotten by 1923 in the civil war's aftermath. The latter nadir was the reference point by which the "low standards" were calibrated, and it was quite different from "what should have been" if Bolshevism had never destroyed the better angels of earlier Russian progressivism, which is how Scott's examples of improved living standards and Gordon's examples of degraded living standards were both accurate despite their apparent contradiction.

It would be some years before Scott later became openly anti-Bolshevik. Reading his book of 1942 and the embassy dispatches in its addendum, which were from 1938 but were not published until decades later, it is traceable that in between the time when he was very enthusiastic about the Soviet future (i.e., in the early 1930s) and the time when he became anti-Bolshevik (years later) was a transition that started in 1937 at the height of the purge.

=== Moscow years and debriefing by the U.S. embassy in Moscow ===
From 1938 to 1941, owing to the Soviet crackdown on foreign nationals during and after the Great Purge, Scott was no longer allowed to work in the plant at Magnitogorsk. He would have left Russia, but he could not bring his wife and children out of the country because his wife's request for an exit visa was being held up. Waiting for his wife's visa, he spent about 2.5 years in Moscow as a translator, journalist, observer of daily life, and sometime novelist. During this time, the U.S. embassy debriefed him about his time living and working in the USSR. Diplomatic dispatches conveyed this debriefed information to the United States. Their content is published in the addendum to Scott's book. As his book's editor, Stephen Kotkin, said, "Embassy officials regularly debriefed American citizens living and working in the USSR." Most such people were American engineers doing consulting work in Soviet enterprises. Some were workers like Scott who had come to the USSR during the Great Depression with excitement about participating in what was then projected to be the successful construction of a great Soviet socialist future. Such debriefings were one of the only ways for the United States to get nonofficial information about Soviet life and industry, as most real economic data was a state secret in the USSR by the late 1930s, and the U.S. had little successful human intelligence in the country.

It was ascertained in the United States, through the National Security Agency's Venona Project, that the Soviet government was aware of Scott's debriefing and its transmission to the United States, and that, in the paranoia of Stalinism, it characterized them as espionage, although Scott was never privy to any substantial Soviet secrets and was in fact only reporting facts that were fairly obvious to many Soviet workers and administrators, albeit undiscoverable outside the country. For example, these included hearsay about what sort of industrial plant was under construction in this or that city, how huge it was, and what kind of wages and apartments workers were finding available there. They also included objective information on dekulakization, the public and administrative mood during the height of the purge, and objective information on wrecking (both real and doubtfully alleged, both physical and administrative). The three dispatches date from January, February, and March 1938 and cover an array of topics, including the forced labor colony in Magnitogorsk; activities of Soviet secret police, wrecking, both as industrial sabotage and (as the Soviet view included) incompetent but unintentional malpractice; food stores; and the production capabilities of the metallurgical plant in Magnitogorsk. In 1942 Scott moved back to the United States with his wife and two children.

Amongst nearly 1,300 messages sent between New York and Moscow in 1942, just twenty-three were successfully decrypted and translated by the Venona Project. A cable sent from New York to Moscow on May 22, 1942, addressed to code name "Viktor", who was the director of Soviet Intelligence during World War II Lieutenant General Pavel Fitin, credited "Ivanov" with delivering "a mass of materials on the Soviet war industry" to the United States. Nearly three years later cable number 207 sent from Moscow to a Soviet Intelligence office in New York on March 8, 1945, revealed that the cover name "Ivanov" referred to John Scott.

== Criticism ==
=== By Scott Nearing ===
Scott Nearing, John Scott's father, eventually broke with him because of his criticism of Bolshevik and Bolshevik-inspired systems. Nearing, a pacifist, remained sympathetic to socialism in countries with violently repressive regimes whereas his son did not. Nearing was a sympathetic socialist guest of the Albanian state of the Stalinist-inspired Hoxha regime as late as the 1970s. John's association with Henry Luce and, later, Richard Nixon also contributed to the estrangement between father and son. Scott Nearing said in a letter, "I want nothing to do with him." Nearing refused to go to his son's funeral.

=== By Whittaker Chambers ===
Whittaker Chambers claimed that Scott tried to influence Time Magazine publisher Henry Luce to remove Chambers as foreign news editor because of Chambers' anti-communist and anti-Soviet views. Scott's own evolution in his views over the decades is relevant here as at the time of which Chambers spoke Scott still had hope for socialism in its non-Stalinist forms whereas by the 1970s his disillusionment was more extensive.

== See also ==
- Scott Nearing, father
- Magnitogorsk
- Alexander Dolgun (1926–1986) survivor of the Soviet Gulag who returned to his native United States
- Thomas Sgovio (1916–1997) American artist, and former inmate of a Soviet GULAG camp in Kolyma
- Victor Herman (1915–1985) Jewish-American initially known as the 'Lindbergh of Russia', who then spent 18 years in the Gulags of Siberia
- George Padmore (1903–1959) Pan-Africanist, journalist, studied in the United States and moved to the Soviet Union
- William Henry Chamberlin (1897–1969) American journalist during the trial of Robert Robinson's assailants
- Jack Littlepage (1894–?) American mining engineer who helped the Soviet gold industry (1929–1937)
- Alexander Pavlovitch Serebrovsky (1884–1938) Soviet petroleum and mining engineer executed during the Great Purge

== Sources ==
- Robinson, Robert (1988), Black on Red: My 44 Years Inside the Soviet Union, with Jonathon Slevin, Washington, DC: Acropolis Books, ISBN 0-87491-885-5.
- Scott, John (1989) [1942], Kotkin, Stephen (ed.), Behind the Urals: An American Worker in Russia's City of Steel, Indiana University Press, ISBN 978-0253205360, archived from the original on September 5, 2017.
- Chambers, Whittaker (1952). Witness. Random House. ISBN 0-89526-571-0.
- Sam Tanenhaus, Whittaker Chambers, New York: Random House (1997), pg. 182.
- John Earl Haynes and Harvey Klehr, Venona: Decoding Soviet Espionage in America, New Haven: Yale University Press, (1999), pgs. 194, 195, 237.
