= List of Gulag memoirs =

Below is a list of books which are memoirs and fictionalized personal accounts which speak about Gulag.

- 20 Years in Siberia [20 de ani în Siberia] by Anița Nandriș-Cudla is the life account written by a Romanian peasant woman from Bukovina (Mahala village near Cernăuți) who managed to survive the harsh, forced labor system together with her three sons.
- 7000 days in Siberia by Karlo Štajner, a Croatian communist who was active in the former Kingdom of Yugoslavia and the manager of the Comintern Publishing House in Moscow 1932–39, was arrested one night and taken from his Moscow home after being accused of anti-revolutionary activities. He spent 20 years in camps from Solovki to Norilsk. After USSR–Yugoslavian political normalization he was re-tried and quickly found innocent. He left the Soviet Union with his wife, who had been waiting for him, in 1956 and spent the rest of his life in Zagreb, Croatia. He wrote a book titled
- Alexander Dolgun's Story: An American in the Gulag by Alexander Dolgun, a member of the US Embassy
- Amerikanetz by John H. Noble
- The Endless Steppe
- I Chose Freedom, written by Victor Kravchenko after defecting to the United States in 1944. As a leader of industrial plants he had encountered forced labor camps in across the Soviet Union from 1935 to 1941. He describes a visit to one camp at Kemerovo in The Gulag Archipelago
- "Barbed Wires in Blossom", a novella based largely on the personal experiences of Gurgen Mahari, an Armenian writer and poet, who was arrested in 1936, released in 1947, arrested again in 1948 and sent into Siberian exile as an "unreliable type" until 1954
- Coming out of the Ice: An Unexpected Life by Victor Herman. He experienced firsthand many places, prisons, and experiences that Aleksandr Solzhenitsyn was able to reference in only passing or through brief second hand accounts.
- Dancing Under the Red Star by Karl Tobien (ISBN 1-4000-7078-3) tells the story of Margaret Werner, an athletic girl who moves to Russia right before Stalin came to power. She faces many hardships, as her father is taken away from her and imprisoned. Werner is the only American woman who was held in the Gulag to tell about it.
- The First Circle by Aleksandr Solzhenitsyn , an account of three days in the lives of prisoners in the Marfino sharashka or special prison was submitted for publication to the Soviet authorities shortly after One Day in the Life of Ivan Denisovich but was rejected and later published abroad in 1968.
- Rossi, Jacques. 2018. Fragments of Lives: Chronicles of the Gulag (Antonelli-Street trans.). Prague: Karolinum. ISBN 978-80-246-3700-6
- From the Gulag to the Killing Fields: Personal Accounts of Political Violence and Repression in Communist States, with a foreword by A. Applebaum. Intercollegiate Studies Institute. ISBN 1-932236-78-3. (From the annotation: "more than forty dramatic personal memoirs of Communist violence and repression from political prisoners across the globe.")
- From the Leipzig trial to the Siberia camps (От Лайпцигския процес в Сибирските лагери, Изток-Запад, София, България, 2012 ISBN 978-619-152-025-1) by Blagoy Popov, a Bulgarian communist and a defendant in the Leipzig trial, along with Georgi Dimitrov and Vasil Tanev, was arrested in 1937 during the Stalinist purges and spent 17 years in Norillag. Popov was released in 1954, after the death of Stalin, and returned to Bulgaria.
- The Gulag Archipelago by Aleksandr Solzhenitsyn
- Gulag Boss: A Soviet Memoir,a 2011 memoir by Fyodor Vasilevich Mochulsky (1918–1999), a Soviet engineer and eventual head of a number of Gulag camps in the northern Russian region of Pechora (Pechorlag), from 1940 to 1946.
- He Leadeth Me: An Extraordinary Testament of Faith by Walter Ciszek, ISBN 978-0-385-04051-8.
- I Found God in Soviet Russia by John H. Noble
- I Was an NKVD Agent, written by Anatoli Granovsky after defecting to Sweden in 1946. It includes his experiences seeing Gulag prisoners as a young boy, as well as his experiences as a prisoner in 1939. Granovsky's father was sent to the Gulag in 1937.
- I Was a Slave in Russia by John H. Noble, an American factory owner's son
- In the Claws of the GPU
- An Island Hell by Sozerko Malsagov
- Journey Into the Whirlwind by Yevgenia Ginzburg
- A Journey to the Land Ze-Ka Julius Margolin
- Kolyma Stories, by Aleksandr Biryukov,
- Kolyma Tales by Varlam Shalamov's, a short-story collection, cited by most major works on the Gulag and widely considered one of the main Soviet accounts.
- Life sentence: Memoirs of a Ukrainian political prisoner By Danylo Shumuk. Canadian Institute of Ukrainian Study, 1984, 401 pp., ISBN 978-0-920862-17-9.
- "The Long Walk: The True Story of a Trek to Freedom" by Slavomir Rawicz. In 1941, the author and six other fellow prisoners escaped a Soviet labor camp in Yakutsk.
- Magadan by Michel Solomon (Michael Solomon), 1971. New York: Auerbach. ISBN 0-87769-085-5. Roumanian journalist's account of his life under the Communists, including seven years in labour camps in Magadanskaya Oblast', 1949-1955
- Man Is Wolf to Man
- Petkevich, Tamara. 2010. Memoir of a Gulag Actress. Northern Illinois University.
- Memoirs about Vorkutlag
- My Twenty-six Prisons and my Escape from Solovetsky by Yury Bezsonov
- Tell the West by Jerzy Gliksman 1948, subtitled "An account of his experiences as a slave laborer in the Union of Soviet Socialist Republics"
- Ten years in Gulag (Deset godina u Gulagu, Matica crnogorska, Podgorica, Montenegro 2004). Two volumes by Savić Marković Štedimlija, a pro-Croatian Montenegrin ideologist. Caught in Austria by the Red Army in 1945, he was sent to the USSR and spent ten years in the Gulag.
- Hava Volovich. 1999. Till My Tale is Told: Women's Memoirs of Gulag, ed. Simeon Vilensky. Indiana University Press.
- A Travel to the Land Ze-Ka; Julius Margolin's book was finished in 1947, but it was impossible to publish such a book about the Soviet Union at the time, immediately after World War II.
- Verbannt und Verleugnet (Banished and Vanished) by John H. Noble
- With God in Russia by Walter Ciszek
- Within the Whirlwind by Yevgenia Ginzburg (1982), made into the biopic Within the Whirlwind (2009)
- A World Apart (book) by Gustaw Herling-Grudziński, which was translated into English by Andrzej Ciolkosz and published with an introduction by Bertrand Russell in 1951. By describing life in the Gulag in a harrowing personal account, it provides an in-depth, original analysis of the nature of the Soviet communist system.
- Za Skhidnim Obriyem (Beyond The Eastern Horizon) By Danylo Shumuk. Paris, Baltimore: Smoloskyp, 1974, 447 pp.
- Zekameron of the 20th Century, (Vernon Kress, alias of Peter Demant) (Вернон Кресс, "Зекамерон XX века"). Despite being described as a novel, it is a loose collection of autobiographical stories
