= Americans in the Gulag =

Among the factors that influenced the Cold War were the detention of several hundred Americans in the Gulag labor camps, in addition to the obstacles in returning some 2,000 American POWs out of an estimated 75,000 who ended up in the Soviet occupation zone of Germany by 1945, as well as the reunification of Soviet wives with their American husbands.

== Early Soviet Union ==
Early Soviet Union invited foreigners, especially engineers and trained workers. Many of the arrived were sympathizers of the Communism and the Soviet Union in particular. Others were just lured by the possibility of employment during the Great Depression.

During the Great Purge many of them were convicted of espionage. Notable American victims of the period are Victor Herman, John Tuchelsky (1894-1938) and Thomas Sgovio (1916—1997).

Their fate is the subject of the 2008 book The Forsaken: An American Tragedy in Stalin's Russia by Tim Tzouliadis. As documented by Tzouliadis, they were essentially abandoned by the U.S. government and its diplomats in Moscow.

== Americans in Soviet-occupied territories ==
Some 5,000 Americans fell into Soviet hands when the Red Army occupied Eastern Poland in 1939. Some 2,000 more claiming American citizenship were added when the Soviets pushed the Nazis from Poland in 1944. Of the latter ones about 600 cases were confirmed and about 100 proved to be false. Many of all of these claimed dual Polish and American citizenship. The mistreatment of American citizens ranged from denying consular access to incarceration in a gulag to execution. Most of them, together with the local population, were forcibly assigned Soviet citizenship, even the American-born Americans. Attempts to renounce this citizenship or to contact the American embassy were blocked; these people were harassed by the authorities, and those who were most insistent landed in a gulag on trumped-up charges. There was a similar situation in the Baltic States. The protests by the United States were stonewalled by the Soviets. The situation went to the extremes: the American embassy strongly advised not to insist on American citizenship in the cases when the person was threatened with the arrest.

== Cold War wars and espionage ==
A number of Americans, mostly military pilots, were captured during the Korean War in North Korea and ended up in the Soviet Union. In a 1992 letter, Boris Yeltsin stated that nine US planes had been shot down in the early 1950s and 12 Americans had been held as prisoners. As a result, in March 1992, a joint Russian-American task force was created to review these cases. Dmitri Volkogonov, a former Soviet general and co-chairman of the Task Force Russia told a US Senate Committee that 730 airmen had been captured on Cold War spy flights.

== Notable prisoners ==
- Walter Ciszek, Polish-American Jesuit priest who conducted clandestine missionary work in the Soviet Union between 1939 and 1963.
- Homer Harold Cox, kidnapped in East Berlin in 1949 and released in 1953, together with US Merchant Marine Leland Towers.
- Alexander Dolgun, US embassy clerk falsely accused of espionage; author of the memoir Alexander Dolgun’s Story: An American in the Gulag.
- Lovett Fort-Whiteman, American political activist and Communist International functionary.
- William Marchuk, kidnapped in 1949 and released in 1955.
- Victor Herman, American, then worker of Ford Motors in the Soviet Union
- John H. Noble, American businessman in Germany.
- Isaiah Oggins, American communist and spy for the Soviet secret police.
- Thomas Sgovio, American artist, ex-Communist.
- Margaret Werner Tobien, together with her mother they were accused of espionage in 1943. Earlier, in 1937 her father, a worker of Ford Motors in the Soviet Union, was accused of treason.

== See also ==
- The Forsaken: An American Tragedy in Stalin's Russia
