= Jack Littlepage =

American mining engineer (1894–1948)

John D. "Jack" Littlepage
- Born: September 14, 1894; Gresham, Oregon, U.S.
- Died: July 8, 1948 (aged 53); Seattle, Washington, U.S.
- Other name: Ivan Eduardovich
- Occupation: Mining engineer
- Known for: Employment in the USSR; recipient of the Order of the Red Banner of Labour
- Spouse: Georgia Blackstone Gilpatrick Littlepage (1898–1981)
- Children: 2

John Dickinson "Jack" Littlepage (September 14, 1894 – July 8, 1948) was an American mining engineer. He was born in Gresham, Oregon on September 14, 1894. Littlepage was employed in the USSR from 1928 to 1937, becoming Deputy Commissar of the USSR's Gold Trust in the 1930s. He is one of the foreign recipients of the Order of the Red Banner of Labour.

== Biography ==
Alexander Serebrovsky, "one of the mainstays of the [Soviet] regime", was charged by Joseph Stalin with reforming the Soviet gold industry. Stalin had read several books about the 1849 California Gold Rush, including works by Bret Harte and Blaise Cendrars' book Sutter's Gold, later turned into an American film. In 1927, the 45-year-old Serebrovsky travelled to Alaska posing as a simple "Professor of Mines" (he was in fact a professor at the Moscow Mining Institute as well as a key functionary of the regime); his plan was to duplicate American mining techniques in the USSR.

At one of the first mines he visited, Serebrovsky met Jack Littlepage, then age 33, who was a successful mining engineer. Littlepage initially dismissed Serebrovsky's offer of work in the USSR stating that he "did not like Bolsheviks" as they "seem to have the habit of shooting people, especially engineers." However Serebrovsky persevered and persuaded Littlepage to emigrate to the USSR with his family.

Littlepage arrived on 1 May 1928 with his wife and two young daughters. In a Soviet propaganda leaflet, Littlepage was said to have been "drawn to the Soviet Union by the grand scale of our construction work, the ideas of great Stalin, the chance to unfold his talents freely.", with the financial incentive left unstated. Littlepage soon learned Russian, was renamed Ivan Eduardovich and with unflagging drive "set about verifying calculations, designs, estimates, plans of work."

Sabotage was something strange to my experience before I went to Russia... However, I hadn't worked many weeks in Russia before I encountered unquestionable instances of deliberate and malicious wrecking... we removed from the oil reservoir [of a large Diesel engine] about a quart of quartz sand... such petty industrial sabotage was, and still is, so common in all branches of Soviet industry... that the police have had to create a whole army of professional and amateur spies to cut the amount down... [because] the authorities in Russia have been fighting a whole series of open or disguised civil wars. [bolding added]

In the following six years, the USSR's gold production outstripped the United States' and was poised to exceed the British Empire's. Unlike many U.S. citizens who emigrated to the USSR at the time, Littlepage was not forced to take up Soviet citizenship nor did the Soviet regime confiscate his U.S. passport as it did in the case of many such emigres. However he was required to ignore the use of slave labour in the Soviet gold mines. In the midst of the Soviet repressions, Littlepage carried on his work as Deputy Commissar, advising Serebrovsky on the deployment of Alaskan-style prospecting parties in the virgin Soviet gold fields.

The December 1934 assassination of Stalin's right-hand man Sergei Kirov served as one of the triggers for the Great Purge of the Soviet Communist Party. Littlepage noted that the assassination when occurred "the country had just begun to settle down to a fairly comfortable routine after the painful years which followed the Second Communist Revolution." Just a few months prior "in the summer of 1934, the Government had announced... that the federal police... would no longer have the power of arrest people.... for five years without open trial. Now the Government announced the old powers were restored to the police, and the latter began to exercise them with the greatest vigor."

The authorities use forced labor consisting not only of small farmers, but of every other group [deemed] socially undesirable [for examples] former priests and Mohammedan holy men... The recent purges, which have affected hundreds of thousands of persons, have no doubt added to the labor army. Ordinary criminals, such as murderers and thieves are mixed up indiscriminately... with members of various disfavored groups such as the kulaks, nomads, ex-priests, and the like. In fact, the authorities... treat a brutal murderer, as a rule, with more consideration than a small farmer who didn't want to turn his domestic animals and house and garden into a common pool with his neighbors to make a collective farm. [bolding added]

Littlepage's success earned him the Order of the Red Banner of Labour and a Soviet-built Ford Model A the latter being regarded as one of the most precious gifts of the time in the USSR. Littlepage was to return to the U.S. several times to recruit more engineers into the Soviet gold mine industry: at the time of the Great Depression there was never a shortage of willing candidates. Many of the thousands of U.S. workers who emigrated to the USSR at the time in search of work subsequently became victims of the Terror.

In 1936, Serebrovsky's Russian-language book On the Gold Front was published; however his book was "withdrawn from circulation very shortly after it appeared because some of the men mentioned in it were later discovered to be conspirators." Serebrovsky was eventually "unmasked", according to Stalin's own report, as a "vicious enemy of the people" who had delivered no less than 50m gold bars to Leon Trotsky. Dubbed the "Soviet Rockefeller" for his work on the Caucasian oil fields, Serebrovsky was executed and Littlepage was tainted by his connection to Serebrovsky; Littlepage found himself starved of work. Petrified Russian employees refused to come anywhere near him, a friend of an executed "enemy of the people" and a foreigner at a time when foreigners were deeply distrusted by the paranoia which dominated Soviet policy.

[As] an American, I am not compelled or expected to do many of the things which Soviet engineers have to do, and which cut down their efficiency to a fraction. [Engineers] must take an active part in the country's political life [spending] hours every day on matters which have nothing to do with production... In addition to this, Soviet engineers are subjected to several times more paperwork than western industrial countries. [bolding added]

Remarkably, Littlepage was one of the few immigrants from the U.S. allowed to leave the USSR during the Terror: those who remained captive were killed or persecuted. Littlepage left the USSR shortly after an interview at the U.S. embassy in Moscow on 22 September 1937 in which he asserted his opinion that Soviet industry Commissar Georgy Pyatakov had organized "wrecking" in various gold mines.

In a series of articles for The Saturday Evening Post Littlepage described a continuing "Far Eastern gold rush" and the "intrepid men and women" prospecting the wastes of Eastern Siberia. Even when responding to questions from the U.S. War Department, Littlepage did not mention the legions of slaves deployed to extract the gold in lethal conditions in the frozen wastelands of the Gulag in north-eastern Siberia. Littlepage authored a book on his experience: "In Search of Soviet Gold" jointly with foreign correspondent for the Saturday Evening Post and The Christian Science Monitor Demaree Bess

== See also ==
- The Ghost of the Executed Engineer
- An American Engineer in Stalin's Russia: The Memoirs of Zara Witkin, 1932-1934.
- Alexander Dolgun (1926-1986) survivor of the Soviet Gulag who returned to his native United States.
- John H. Noble (1923–2007) American survivor of the Gulags
- Robert Robinson (engineer) (1907-1994) Jamaican-born toolmaker who initially worked in the U.S. auto industry in the United States but spent 44 years in the Soviet Union.
- Thomas Sgovio (1916-1997) American artist, and former inmate of a Soviet GULAG camp in Kolyma
- Victor Herman (1915-1985) Jewish-American initially known as the 'Lindbergh of Russia', who then spent 18 years in the Gulags of Siberia.
