= Grand Island North Light =

Lighthouse in Michigan, United States

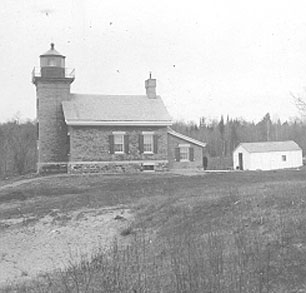
- Location: Munising, Michigan
- Coordinates: 46°33′32″N 86°41′28″W

Tower
- Constructed: 1867
- Construction: brick
- Automated: 1927
- Height: 205 feet (62 m) focal plane
- Shape: square
- Markings: square brick tower
- Heritage: National Register of Historic Places listed place

Light
- First lit: 1867
- Deactivated: 1961
- Focal height: 73 ft (22 m)
- Lens: Fourth-order Fresnel lens
- Range: 19.25 mi (30.98 km)
- Characteristic: Fl W 6s
- Grand Island North Light Station
- U.S. National Register of Historic Places
- U.S. Historic district
- Nearest city: Munising, Michigan
- Area: 29 acres (12 ha)
- Architect: U.S. Lighthouse Est.
- NRHP reference No.: 85002149
- Added to NRHP: September 12, 1985

The Grand Island North Light (also known as the Old North Light) is a lighthouse located on the north end of Grand Island near Munising, Michigan in south eastern Lake Superior. It was listed on the National Register of Historic Places in 1985.

== History ==
With the planned opening of the Soo Locks in 1855, it was anticipated that shipping traffic in Lake Superior would dramatically increase. Thus, in 1853, Congress appropriated money to locate a lighthouse on the northern end of Grand Island. A site atop a 175-foot (53 m) cliff was chosen for the light, and construction commenced in 1856 on the first lighthouse located here; the light was put into service with a fourth-order Fresnel lens later that year. However, due to the poor quality of materials used in construction, the condition of the building deteriorated rapidly, and by 1865 the light was judged to be in "wretched condition." A replacement was recommended, and Congress appropriated more money the following year.

The second Grand Island North Light station was completed and put into service in 1867. The brick lighthouse was constructed using standard plans provided by the U.S. Lighthouse Establishment. The original Fresnel lens was transferred to the new tower.

A keeper and an assistant were stationed at the lighthouse. A few minor changes were made to the boathouse location and stairs during its operational history. The light was automated in 1927 and became unwatched. The light was decommissioned and replaced with a 25-foot steel pole in 1961.

=== Restoration ===
The surplus station was sold to Loren and Patricia Graham, both notable historians and Michigan natives, in 1972. The Grahams restored the lighthouse in 1973. The station is currently used as a private summer home, however the couple intends to donate the property to the Marquette Regional History Center.

== Description ==
The Grand Island North Light Station is a two-story, rectangular brick building. A three-story, 40-foot (12 m) light tower and a one-story kitchen addition are attached to the station. The station has a tin-covered gable roof supported by queen-post trusses. The exterior is painted in the original colors of yellow, white, and black, and the station as a whole looks substantially as it did when built.

Four other buildings are located on the site: a tool shed, fuel storage shed, and outhouse (all made of brick); and a wooden well-house.

=== Characteristic ===
The light originally flashed white for four seconds every 90-seconds, however this changed following its automation. The light now flashes white every six seconds

== See also ==
- Lighthouses in the United States
