= Peter Palchinsky =

Russian engineer (1875-1929)

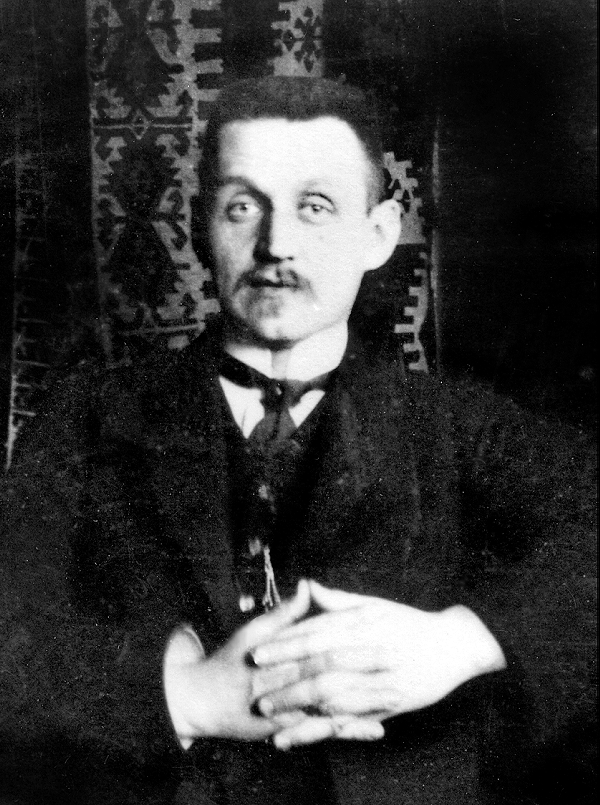
P. A. Palchinsky, 1913

Peter Akimovich Palchinsky (Russian: Пётр Иоаки́мович (Аки́мович) Пальчи́нский; 9 October [O.S. 27 September] 1875–22 May 1929) was a Russian engineer who played a significant role in the introduction of scientific method into Russian industry.

== Biography ==
Palchinsky was born on 9 October 1875 in Sarapul, Vyatka Governorate to the family of Ioakim Fyodorovich Palchinsky and Aleksandra Vasilyevna Palchinskaya (née Tchaikovskaya), the sister of Russian revolutionary Nikolai Tchaikovsky. Not long after, he moved with his mother and four siblings to Kazan, a city on the Volga river in Tatarstan. He was the oldest of all his siblings. He grew up with his mother in the Volga river city of Kazan. He developed an early interest in science which led him to enroll as a student at the Mining Institute in Saint Petersburg in 1893. This was one of the elite engineering institutions of Tsarist Russia. There he mixed with leading Russian scientists and was introduced to radical politics.

In 1901, Palchinsky was recruited by the Russian government to investigate the living conditions of workers in the coal mines of the Donets Basin; however, his criticism of the workers' living conditions was not well received and he was dismissed from the commission. Shortly after the Revolution of 1905 Palchinsky became interested in the Socialist Revolutionary Party, which at the time was the largest party in Russia. He sympathized with the moderate wing of the party and was sharply critical of the radicals. He was implicated in the 1905 effort of the revolutionaries to declare a separate democratic. It is not clear if he was an active participant in the movement or just a sympathizer. Because there was no hard evidence to convince the Russian government that Palchinsky had an active role in the movement, he was not brought to trial, but instead exiled under the emergency powers granted to the police during revolutionary turmoil.

He emigrated from Russia moving to London, Turin and Rome. In 1911 he directed the mining department of the World Industrial Exhibition in Turin.

After his 8-year exile, Palchinsky and his wife returned to their native land in 1913. He was deputy chair of the Imperial Russian Central War Industry Committee during the First World War. After the February Revolution in 1917 he held several positions in the provisional government. While probably not a formal member, he associated himself with the moderate wing of the Socialist Revolutionary Party and supported the war effort against Germany. In 1917, Bolsheviks arranged for a takeover of the provincial government and imprisoned ministers and other officials of the Provisional Government including Palchinsky.

Palchinsky resisted the Bolsheviks rule; however, gradually, certain aspects of the new Soviet political system appealed to him and many of his associates. Their commitment to creating a Planned economy, to industrialization, and to science and technology were promising to Palchinsky.

Palchinsky believed that the obstacles to the Russia's industrial advancement were not technological, but political, social, and educational. He argued that Russian engineers were not equipped to deal with the competitive world because Russian engineers did not approach problems in an "academic-dilettantish" way. Instead, they took on every problem as a purely technical one and assumed that if a solution incorporated the latest science, then it was the best solution.

Palchinsky worked with the Soviet Authorities and the Communist party in planning industry and increasing the strength of Russia, but he was strongly against any takeover by the Party of any organization of which he was a member. He opposed the interests of the Communist Party. During this time, policies started by the Bolsheviks and Stalin emphasized huge projects controlled by Moscow. These projects did not include consideration for local conditions and safety was sacrificed to output. This did not set well with Palchinsky as he had seen firsthand the death and destruction caused when consideration of local conditions and safety measures were not taken. He continued to criticize these projects and was arrested in April 1928.

After the Shakhty Trial, prosecutor Krylenko wanted a bigger show trial of engineers. He tortured Palchinsky so he would take on the role of the leader of a state-wide conspiracy. Palchinsky did not give in. He was executed in 1929.

== Legacy ==
Palchinsky was vilified by Soviet propaganda, and then mostly forgotten, but he is given a much more favourable hearing in Alexander Solzhenitsyn's The Gulag Archipelago (1974), pt.1 and November 1916 (1984) which present him as a clear-eyed, hard-working spokesman of the engineer community.

In 1996, Loren Graham published The Ghost of the Executed Engineer: Technology and the Fall of the Soviet Union, which used an account of Palchinsky's life to illustrate the role of technology in the first decade of Soviet society.

In 2011, Tim Harford published Adapt: Why Success Always Starts with Failure (2011), which described Palchinsky's approach to industrial projects as "three 'Palchinsky principles'": variation, survivability, and selection.
