= Demant (surname) =

Demant is a surname. Notable people with the name include:

- Kiritapu Demant (born 1996), New Zealand rugby union player
- Peter Demant (1918–2006), Russian writer
- Ruahei Demant (born 1995), New Zealand rugby union player
- V. A. Demant (1893–1983), English priest
