= Coming Out of the Ice =

1982 television film directed by Waris Hussein

- Genre: Biography; Drama
- Based on: Coming Out of the Ice by Victor Herman
- Teleplay by: Alan Sharp
- Directed by: Waris Hussein
- Starring: John Savage; Willie Nelson; Francesca Annis; Ben Cross
- Music by: Maurice Jarre
- Country of origin: United States
- Original language: English

Production
- Executive producer: Frank Konigsberg
- Producer: Christopher Pearce
- Cinematography: Richard H. Kline
- Editor: Malcolm Cooke
- Running time: 1hr. 44 minutes
- Production company: EMI Films

Original release
- Network: CBS
- Release: May 23, 1982

Coming Out of the Ice is a 1982 American made-for-television biographical film of Victor Herman. It is based upon Herman's 1979 autobiography, Coming Out of the Ice, about his decades of imprisonment in the Soviet Gulag system.

The film was shot in Britain and Finland for CBS television and theatrical release abroad.

== Cast ==
- John Savage as Victor Herman
- Willie Nelson as "Red" Loon
- Ben Cross as General Tukhachevsky
- Francesca Annis as Galina

== See also ==
- The Forsaken: An American Tragedy in Stalin’s Russia
