= Marvin Makinen =

American biochemist (born 1939)

- Born: August 19, 1939 (age 87); Chassell, Michigan, US
- Education: University of Pennsylvania (BA); University of Pennsylvania School of Medicine (MD); University of Oxford (DPhil)
- Scientific career
- Fields: Biochemistry; Molecular biology
- Workplaces: University of Chicago

Marvin William Makinen (born August 19, 1939) has been a member of the faculty at the University of Chicago since 1974 and is a founding member of the Human Rights Board at the university.

== Education ==
Born in Chassell, Michigan, Makinen earned a B.A. at the University of Pennsylvania in 1961, an M.D. at the University of Pennsylvania School of Medicine in 1968, and a D. Phil. at the University of Oxford in 1976. He is presently professor in the department of biochemistry and molecular biology at the University of Chicago, and has served as chairman of the department from 1988 to 1993. His primary research interests in molecular biophysics and biochemistry are in mechanisms of enzymes and the structural basis of enzyme action.

Makinen completed the fourth year of his undergraduate education at the Free University of Berlin as a Willi Brandt Exchange Scholar from the University of Pennsylvania.

== Imprisonment ==
While traveling in the Soviet Union in 1961, Makinen was arrested for espionage and was sentenced to eight years of imprisonment by a closed military tribunal. Of the slightly more than two years that he spent in the Vladimir Prison, a total of approximately 12 months was spent in solitary confinement.

He was afterwards transferred to a labor camp in the Mordovian ASSR and was later exchanged (together with Rev. Walter Ciszek, S. J.) for two Soviet spies.

== Raoul Wallenberg ==
In the Vladimir Prison one of Makinen's cellmates was Zygurds Kruminsh, who had been previously the only cellmate of the U-2 pilot Gary Powers. While Kruminsh had admitted to only having met a Swedish prisoner, later in labor camp Makinen learned through another former inmate of the Vladimir Prison that Kruminsh had also been a cellmate of "the Swedish prisoner van den Berg."

Since 1990, Makinen has worked on three international committees as a consultant to the Swedish Foreign Ministry regarding the fate of Raoul Wallenberg, who, sent to Budapest as a diplomat in July, 1944, is credited with having saved tens of thousands of Hungarian Jews from annihilation. He was arrested on January 17, 1945, by SMERSH through an order from the Deputy Minister of Defense Nikolai Bulganin and brought to Moscow. The Soviet Ministry of Foreign Affairs acknowledged for the first time in 1957 that Raoul Wallenberg had been in captivity in the Soviet Union but claimed that he had died in 1947. Nonetheless, there has been a constant stream of reports from former prisoners-of-war and inmates of the Soviet prison system attesting to his presence in Soviet prisons, labor camps, or psychiatric hospitals up to the 1980s. A large portion of these reports emanated from the Vladimir Prison located approximately 200 kilometers east of Moscow.

In the course of his work in 1993, Makinen uncovered two retired employees of the prison who identified Raoul Wallenberg from unpublished photographs as having been in the Vladimir Prison. Varvara Ivanovna Larina, one of the two retired employees had worked in Korpus 2 of the Vladimir Prison (Korpus is the Russian word for building) for several decades and remembered the prisoner because, as she explained, he incessantly complained about everything, including the soup ration that was always cold by the time she was able to deliver it to him. Finally the head guard ordered Larina to deliver food rations to this prisoner first. (Such an order indicated to Makinen that this was a prisoner under special treatment. Ordinary prisoners would have been sent to the punishment cell for such actions.) The order by the head guard required Larina to climb the stairs to the third floor first for every meal, get his soup bowl and plate, go back to the first floor, dole out the food rations, and then deliver the rations to him by climbing the stairs again. This changed her work schedule in a substantial manner and provided the reason that she could still recall this prisoner after many years had passed. She remembered that this prisoner was in solitary confinement in a cell opposite to that in which a prisoner by the name of Osmak died. Inspection of the prison records later showed that Osmak, Kirill Ivanovich, died on May 16, 1960. With Ari Kaplan, a leading database computer expert, Makinen carried out a cell occupancy analysis of Korpus 2. The results of the analysis showed that records identifying the occupant of the cell opposite Osmak's cell had been removed from the prison archives. Makinen concluded that the absence of the documents meant that Soviet authorities had wanted to conceal the identity of the prisoner in solitary confinement.

== Personal life ==
Makinen is married, has two children, and became a grandfather in 2008. From 2009 to 2014 he has served as President of the Independent Investigation into Raoul Wallenberg's Fate, Inc., a tax-exempt organization dedicated to uncovering the truth behind Raoul Wallenberg's arrest by Soviet authorities and his fate as a prisoner in the Soviet Union and Russia.
