= Gulag Boss: A Soviet Memoir =

Autobiography by author who lived in the USSR

- Author: Fyodor Vasilevich Mochulsky
- Translator: Deborah A. Kaple
- Language: English
- Genre: Memoir
- Set in: Pechorlag Gulag Camps
- Published: 2011
- Publisher: Oxford University Press, Inc.
- Publication place: United States of America
- Media type: Book
- Pages: 225
- ISBN: 978-0-19-974266-0

Gulag Boss: A Soviet Memoir (Russian: Гулаг Босс: советские мемуары) is a 2011 memoir by Fyodor Vasilevich Mochulsky (1918–1999), a Soviet Engineer and eventual Head of numerous Gulag camps in the northern Russian region of Pechora, from 1940 to 1946. Under the orders of the Central Committee of the Communist Party of the Soviet Union (CPSU), Mochulsky oversaw the construction of a 500 km-long rail line from the Pechorlag camps, bordering the Arctic Circle, to central Russia, with a goal to connect "remote Pechora Camps to the outside world". The book was published posthumously by the Oxford University Press in 2011. It is introduced as well as translated and edited by the historical sociologist, Deborah A. Kaple.

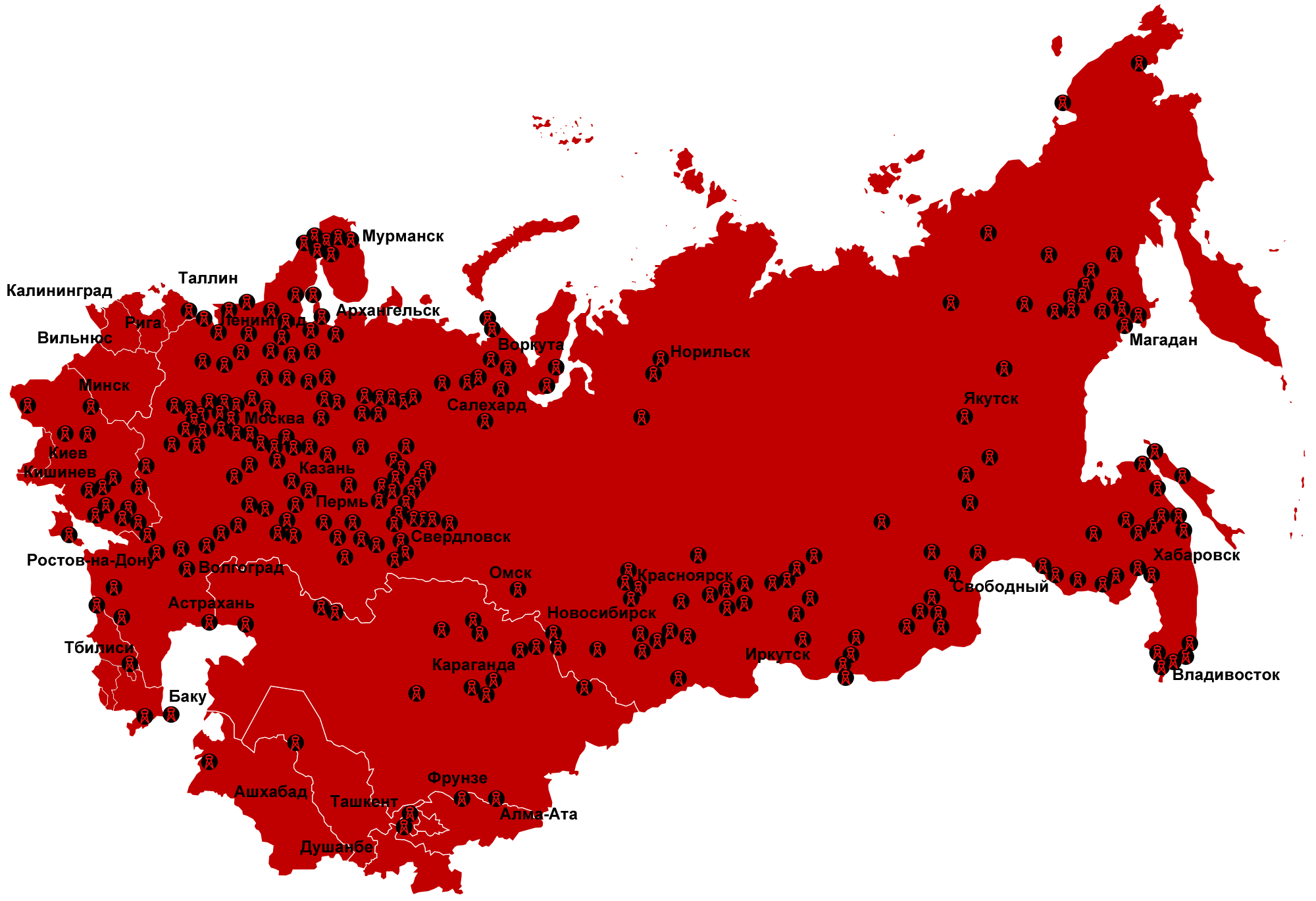
Russian map of active Soviet Union Gulag camps c.1923-1967. It is suggested that upwards of 10 million people were taken prisoner at Gulags across the USSR's territories.

== Background ==
Gulags (Russian: ГУЛаг, acronym of the Russian words Glavnoe upravlenia lagerei, meaning in English: Main Administration of Camps) were forced labor camps operated under the Soviet Union officially from April 25, 1930, until their abolishment by an MVD order on January 25, 1960; although, unofficially, political and criminal prisoners continued to endure forced labour internment until the late 1980s. Originally founded by Vladimir Lenin, the Gulag system continued to expand before reaching its peak during Stalin's rule from the 1930s to the early 1950s. At the height of the USSR, there were 478 gulags, including 53 independent corrective labour colonies (the most common prison system in Russia involving both penal detention and compulsory work) in addition to a vast web of 425 corrective labour colonies spread out across Russia and its territories; this was not including a number of preexisting prisons operated by the State.

Stalin's NKVD (People's Commissariat for Internal Affairs), more commonly referred to as the Secret Police, arrested "counterrevolutionary organisations", intelligentsia, and the management class (who were trained labourers prior to the Bolshevik Revolution in 1917) known as the "bourgeois specialists". If those arrested were able to avoid execution or indefinite exile, they would be imprisoned in Gulags all over the USSR. Stalin's Gulag system provided slave labour, hastening the development of economic projects, such as the White Sea Canal and the Baikal-Amur Mainline.

== Overview ==
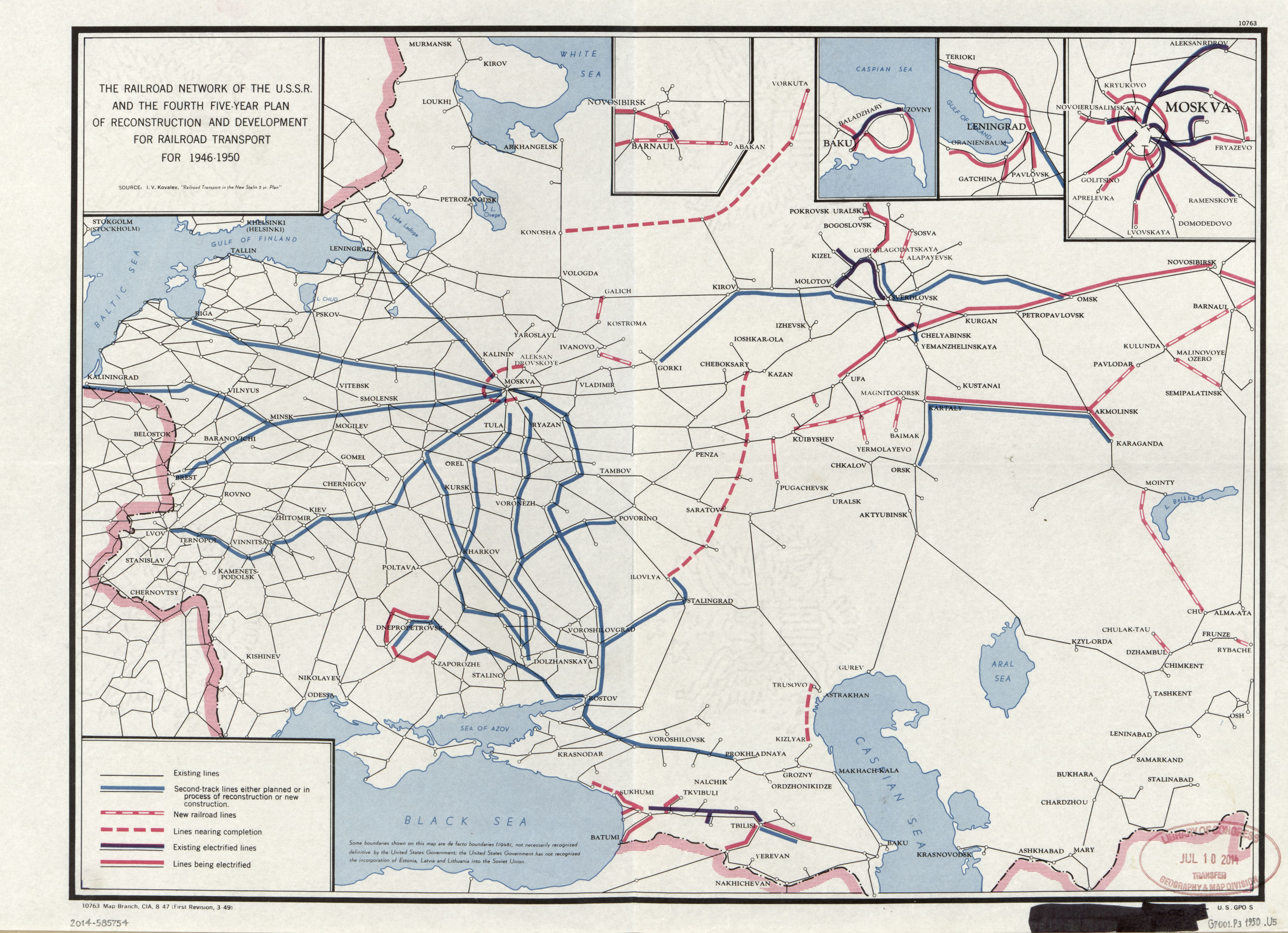
USSR Map (1950) detailing the network of railroads connecting desolate regions to central Moscow (Russian: Moskva)

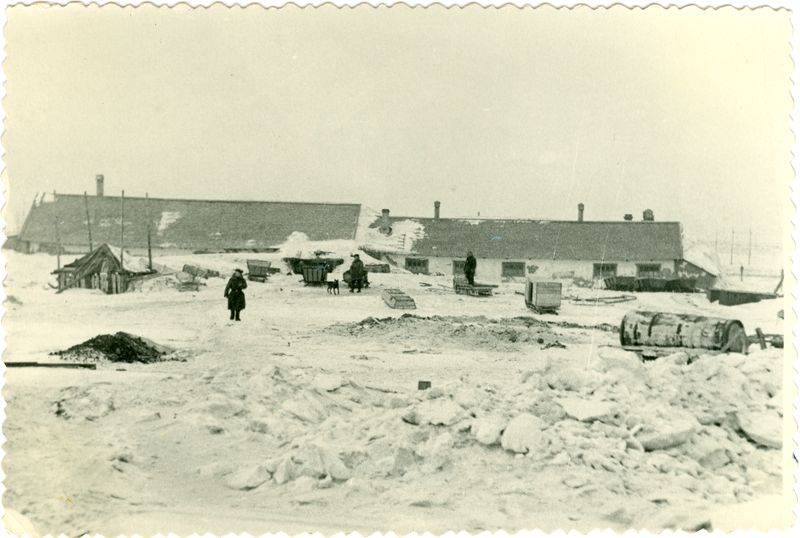
Vorkuta was aforced labor camp stationed in the "continuous permafrost" zone, 145 km from the Arctic Circle. During the winter of 1941–42, the first trainload of coal arrived at the Pechorlag camp from Vorkuta, using the newly built railroad overseen by Mochulsky.

Mochulsky attended school in Minsk during the 1930s, before graduating as an Engineer from the Moscow-based Railroad Transport Engineering Institute in 1940. Within the same year, 22 year old Mochulsky was Ordered by the Central Committee of the Communist Party of the Soviet Union (CPSU) to work as a foreman at a Gulag camp, known as Pechorlag. Kaple describes Pechorlag as being within the Komi ASSR, "northeast of St.Petersburg and west of the Ural Mountains". Mochulsky's primary task was to manage the construction of a 500 km railway line over Russia's permafrost, and into urban USSR zones.

The memoir captures Mochulsky's anecdotes and personal encounters as camp boss, as well as the experiences of camp employees and prisoners. Mochulsky makes reference throughout the text on his ongoing relationship with the USSR regime; where he once offered ardent Soviet support in 1940, Mochulsky began questioning the intents and purposes of the Soviet government after his time at the Gulag ended in 1946.

== Mochulsky's role in the Gulag system ==
As camp boss, Mochulsky's account gives light to the inner workings of the Gulag economy. His memoir explains how civilians were able to occupy only two jobs at the Pechorlag camp; foreman and head of the camp unit. Mochulsky originally began working as camp foreman, before assuming the role as boss of the camp unit as well. Mochulsky moved between different camp units during his time at the Pechorlag, each time acquiring the role as both foreman and camp unit boss, oftentimes because the camps did not have a pre-existing administrative head(s). This was a common occurrence for Camp foreman's working at the Gulag camps in the Pechora region.

== Soviet loyalty ==
Mochulsky was a Soviet regime loyalist during his time in Pechora, but admits, when he first started recounting his experiences at Pechorlag during the 1990s, to being overtly naive to the aggressive tactics enforced by the USSR's administrative body. According to Kaple, Mochulsky's family shared that he would often speak about his work at the Gulag because "the experiences deeply troubled him".

== Women in Pechorlag ==
Despite working in units only housing male prisoners, Mochulsky describes a single occasion where a brigade of women were sent to his 93rd unit. Upon their arrival Mochulsky describes both male and female prisoners begin sexual liaisons almost immediately, as each had been deprived of, what Mochulsky described as "the forbidden fruit". It was also common for civilian employees to try to seduce or "make connections" with female prisoners.

Although there were camp rules against it, there were female camp prisoners who got pregnant from their time in Pechorlag. From that point onward, pregnant prisoners would expect a lighter work load and would be granted more access to the camp food. These privileges even continued into early childhood while the mother was still breastfeeding. For some women who had been impregnated by a civilian or camp employee, her sentence (given that she had been trialled as a criminal, rather than a political prisoner) could be reduced or she could simply be set free, with the USSR's state administration looking "more kindly on her future".

With the intent to illustrate the discrepancies in the USSR's judicial system, Mochulsky recounts a story of a young, nameless girl who had been handed a sentence for a small crime. While being transported from prison to court in a "Black Raven", a windowless truck used to transport prisoners, she was raped by a male prisoner who was also picked up and taken to court. Despite her pleas, the girl was sentenced to three years in the Gulag. The night of her sentence, she was raped by a number of recidivists, forcefully penetrating her with a buckwheat groats moulded into a phallic shape. While at the Pechorlag camp, the girl was further preyed upon by the female barracks leader.

== Reception ==
One of the first reviews of Mochulsky's memoir was written in October 2011 by history scholar, Peter Waldron. It was published in the quarterly, peer-reviewed academic journal, History. Waldron explains that while the memoir is a "fascinating account into Soviet system of penal camps", Mochulsky's "apparent detachment from the broader environment of Stalinism may well have enabled Mochulsky himself to maintain his own personal equilibrium during the decades following his departure from work in the Gulag in 1946". Waldron goes on to comment that "memoirs written more than forty years after the events they describe should be treated with some care" and the "nature of his experience" makes Mochulsky's memoir hard to verify or corroborate.

On the 15th of February 2012, Yan Mann, writing for the Journal of Slavic Military Studies, characterises the memoir as both "original and illuminating". Despite acknowledging that memoirs can often be unintentionally tainted by the flawed memories of its author, Mann finds that Mochulsky's unique position allows historians to "contextualize the daily struggles lower level functionaries dealt with and what impact their actions had on the Gulag system within the Soviet state". Mann also states that Mochulsky sometimes justifies the actions made by the Soviet state, despite working in one of the most brutal Gulag camps in all of the USSR.

== See also ==
- List of Gulag memoirs
