= John H. Noble =

American writer

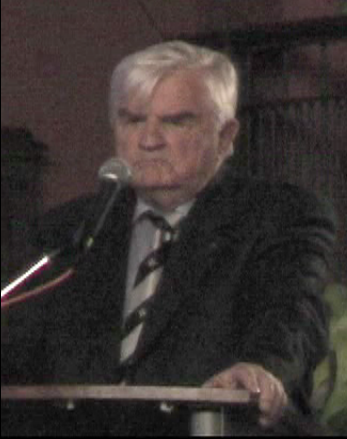
- Noble in 2007, giving a speech in Nossen, Germany
- Born: September 4, 1923; Detroit, Michigan, U.S.
- Died: November 10, 2007 (aged 84)
- Known for: Being a prisoner in Soviet Gulag

John H. Noble (September 4, 1923 – November 10, 2007) was an American survivor of the Soviet Gulag system, who wrote several books which described his experiences in it after he was permitted to leave the Soviet Union and return to the United States.

== Early life and education ==
Noble was born in Detroit, Michigan. His father, who was born in Germany, came to the U.S. as a Seventh-day Adventist missionary in 1922. Finding contradictions in church teachings, he eventually left the church. His mother, a photographer, worked in a photo-finishing company in Detroit and his father became the owner of the company. The Nobles eventually built the company to become one of the top ten photo-finishing companies in the U.S. His father was an acquaintance of a German camera manufacturer who wanted to immigrate to the U.S. and offered to trade his camera factory in Dresden for the Nobles’ company. The German company, which was already notable and would later create landmarks such as the Praktica, became a major international brand, employing 600 workers at the business’ peak.

The Nobles stayed in Nazi Germany during World War II and survived the Allies' firebombing of Dresden in February 1945.

== Imprisonment ==
=== Special Soviet Prison ===
In late 1945, 22-year-old U.S.-born Noble was arrested together with his father by Soviet occupation forces in Dresden and incarcerated at the NKVD special camp Nr. 2 which was located on part of the former Buchenwald concentration camp site. The arrest came about after a newly appointed local Soviet commissar decided to appropriate the Noble family's Practica brand Kamera-Werkstaetten Guthe & Thorsch factory and its stocks of cameras. A trumped-up allegation of spying against the Soviets was levelled against the two male members of the family.

Unlike his father Charles A. Noble, who was released in 1952, John was sentenced to a further 15 years in 1950, and was transferred to the Soviet Gulag system when Special Prison Number 2 was closed in early 1950.

=== Vorkuta ===
Noble was sent to the Vorkuta Gulag, at the northernmost Urals railhead in Siberia.

Doing a variety of menial jobs during his imprisonment, the highest being a uniformed lavatory attendant for the staff, he took part in the Vorkuta uprising of July 1953 as a prominent leader. According to Noble the Vorkuta camp and many other camps which were located nearby had previously been taken over by the inmates, including 400 purged Soviet ex-World War II military men who desperately opted to march their way several hundred miles west to Finland. Apparently making it halfway en route, those inmates were intercepted and either killed in battle or executed immediately afterwards. (Note: According to Soviet sources, the uprising was contained within the camps on August 1, 1953; no mass escape ever happened.) All of the camps soon returned to state control.

Noble eventually managed to smuggle out a postcard which was loosely glued to another prisoner's back. The message which was addressed to a relative in West Germany was passed to his family, who by then had returned to the United States. The postcard was passed to the U.S. Department of State which formally requested that the Soviet government release Noble. He was finally released in 1955, together with several U.S. military captives, thanks to the personal intervention of President Dwight D. Eisenhower.

== Later life ==
By the mid-1990s, Noble was again residing in Dresden, the city where he had been taken prisoner 50 years earlier. The factory building, but not its trademark "Praktica", which had been created independently, had been restored to his family's ownership. He died on November 10, 2007, after suffering a heart attack.

Noble wrote the following books about his ordeal:

- I Found God in Soviet Russia, by John Noble and Glenn D Everett (1959, hardcover).
- I Was a Slave in Russia, by John Noble (Broadview, Illinois: Cicero Bible Press, 1961).
- Amerikanetz (American [man]), by John Noble (Faith & Freedom Forum, 1986).
- Verbannt und Verleugnet (Banished and Vanished), by John H. Noble (Ranger Publishing House, 2005).

== See also ==
- Buchenwald § Soviet Special Camp 2
- Vorkuta uprising
- The Ghost of the Executed Engineer
- Alexander Dolgun (1926–1986) - a survivor of the Soviet Gulag who returned to his native United States.
- Jack Littlepage (1894–1948) - an American engineer who supervised Soviet gold mines from 1928 to 1937
- Karlo Štajner
- Robert Robinson (engineer) (1907–1994) - a Jamaican-born toolmaker who initially worked in the U.S. auto industry in the United States but spent 44 years in the Soviet Union.
- Thomas Sgovio (1916–1997) - an American artist, and a former inmate of a Soviet GULAG camp in Kolyma
- Victor Herman (1915–1985) - a Jewish-American who was initially known as the 'Lindbergh of Russia', spent 18 years in the Gulags of Siberia.
