= Alexander Serebrovsky (engineer) =

Soviet revolutionary (1884–1938)

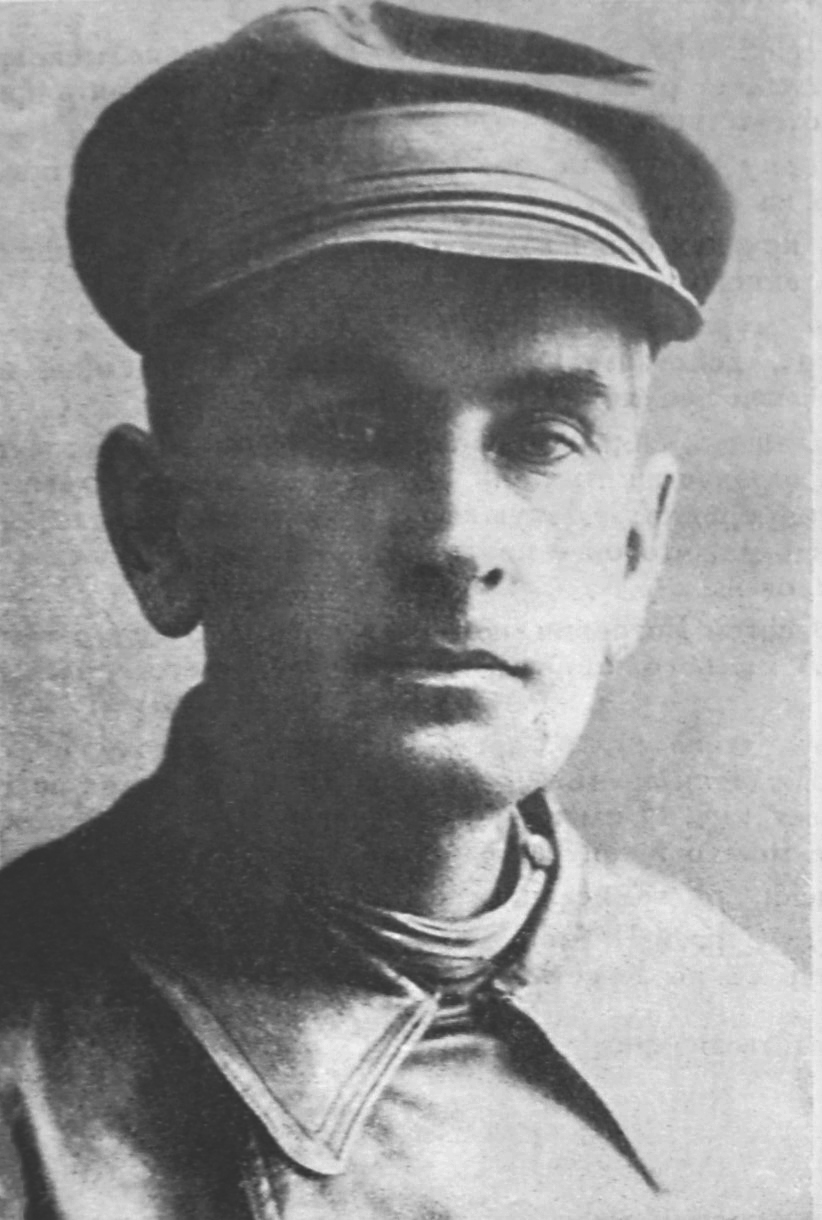
- Born: Alexander Pavlovich Serebrovsky; 25 December 1884; Ufa, Russian Empire
- Died: 10 February 1938 (aged 53); Moscow, RSFSR, Soviet Union
- Occupations: Mining engineer, Petroleum engineer
- Known for: Rebuilding of Russia oil and gold industries after the Russian Civil War
- Awards: Order of Lenin Order of the Red Banner of Labour

Alexander Pavlovich Serebrovsky (Russian: Александр Павлович Серебровский; 25 December [O.S. 13 December] 1884 – 10 February 1938) was a Russian revolutionary and Soviet petroleum and mining engineer nicknamed the "Soviet Rockefeller".

== Biography ==
Serebrovsky was born in Ufa to the wealthy family of an exiled member of Narodnaya Volya, the organization responsible for the assassination of Tsar Alexander II in 1881. In 1903 Serebrovsky became a member of the Russian Social Democratic Labour Party member. Serebrovsky continued the family political activity; his first arrest was in 1902. Serebrovsky studied at St. Petersburg Institute of Technology, but emigrated in 1908 to Brussels. In 1911 Serebrovsky graduated from the Higher Technical School in Brussels and received a degree in mechanical engineering. Upon returning to Russia, he worked in various engineering and technical positions.

During the Russian Civil War, Serebrovsky was a government director of two of the biggest plants in Petrograd. After the October Revolution, Leon Trotsky induced Serebrovsky to join in the Soviet work. The Soviet service brought him, as it did so many others, into the Communist party, where he became "one of the mainstays of the regime". In May 1920, the Council of People's Commissars (CPC) sent 35-year-old Serebrovsky to the Absheron Peninsula to head Azneft, the newly created conglomerate of nationalized Azerbaijani oil enterprises.

=== Soviet Oil Production Reform ===
Serebrovsky's first arrival in the United States was on July 29, 1924; the next day, he visited the central office of the Standard Oil Company of New York, negotiating with Walter C. Teagle. In order to establish credit for the Soviet oil organization, Serebrovsky had to meet with the then 90-year-old John D. Rockefeller and described the meeting in his memoirs: “[Rockefeller] was very well-informed about things in Baku... and about our resources... I proposed two arrangements. First, he would give a letter of guarantee to his bank to pay our supplier invoices from future earnings on petroleum products.... Rockefeller thought for a long time, and then looked at me attentively and unexpectedly agreed. Second, he would give a letter to suppliers in which he would recommend us as buyers well known to him and recommend that we be given the same discount on invoices as Standard Oil. Rockefeller accepted this much more readily. It was around five in the afternoon, and tea was served. The old man poured tea for me, offered me cookies with jam, and then invited me to take a stroll. He walked quickly and for a long time, half an hour, and we went around the entire forest park. I was hardly able to keep up with him, and my leg ached.”

During the return sea voyage from the US to Europe, Serebrovsky finished his book The Oil and Gas Industry in America [Нефтяная и газовая промышленность в Америка], which summarized his stay in the US. During his brief stay in London, he had the book published in Russian.

Serebrovsky was dubbed the "Soviet Rockefeller" for his work on the Caucasian oil fields, and introduction of American drilling tools and techniques. Serebrovsky also contributed to the formation of the gas-oil production department of the Azerbaijan State Oil Academy. and has an offsite oil field named after him.

=== Soviet Gold Production Reform ===
Having successfully completed his assignment to return the Caucasian oil fields to production, Serebrovsky was charged by Joseph Stalin with the task of reforming the Soviet gold industry. Stalin had read several books about the 1849 California gold rush, including works by Bret Harte and Blaise Cendrars' book Sutter's Gold, later turned into an American film. Serebrovsky immediately travelled to Alaska posing as a simple "Professor of Mines" (he was in fact a professor at the Moscow Mining Institute as well as a key functionary of the regime); his plan was to duplicate American mining techniques in the USSR.

At one of the first Alaskan mines he visited, Serebrovsky met Jack Littlepage, then age 33, who was a successful mining engineer. Littlepage initially dismissed Serebrovsky's offer of work in the USSR stating that he "did not like Bolsheviks" as they "seem to have the habit of shooting people, especially engineers." However Serebrovsky persevered and persuaded Littlepage to emigrate to the USSR with his family for nearly 10 years before returning to the USA.

Later, in 1936, Serebrovsky's Russian-language book On the Gold Front [На Золотом фронте - rus] was published; however his book was "withdrawn from circulation very shortly after it appeared because some of the men mentioned in it were later discovered to be conspirators.".

=== Death ===
The one shining... inspired engineer and dedicated Communist was Serebrovsky... I missed him sorely as both friend and confidant. He had a certain gallant courage which inspired confidence in others.

— Wood, William (1950). Our Ally The People Of Russia (As Told To Myriam Sieve)

Serebrovsky was arrested on September 23, 1937, and on February 8, 1938, was convicted of “counter revolutionary activities” by the Military Collegium of the USSR Supreme Court. He was shot on February 10, 1938, at age 53. According to Stalin's own report, Serebrovsky was a "vicious enemy of the people" who had delivered no less than 50m gold bars to Leon Trotsky.

Alexander Serebrovsky was posthumously rehabilitated on May 19, 1956.

Serebrovsky is--or was--a hard-bitten Russian revolutionary, with at least thirty years of intense and often bitter struggles behind him... This man won my sincere admiration for his numerous superior qualities... he was no "yes man." If he didn't like something which was being done, I don't doubt that he would express himself, openly and honestly and even at great personal risk. And the current Soviet system doesn't seem to be healthy for men of that type.

— Littlepage, Jack

== See also ==
- The Ghost of the Executed Engineer
- An American Engineer in Stalin's Russia: The Memoirs of Zara Witkin, 1932-1934.
- Robert Robinson (engineer) (1907-1994) Jamaican-born toolmaker who initially worked in the US auto industry in the United States but spent 44 years in the Soviet Union.
