= Shakhty Trial =

1928 Soviet show trial

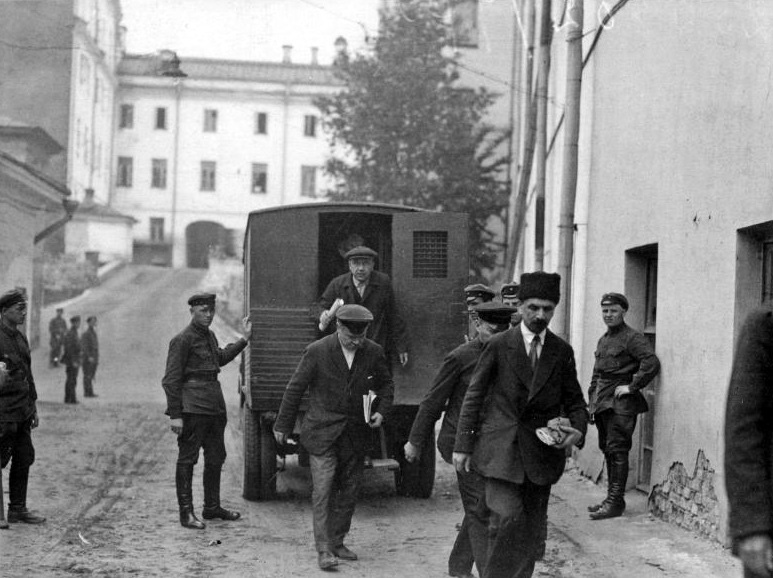
Defendants during the Shakhty Trial

The Shakhty Trial (Russian: Ша́хтинское де́ло) was the biggest Soviet show trial since the case of the Socialist Revolutionary Party in 1922. Fifty-three engineers and managers from the North Caucasus town of Shakhty were arrested in 1928 after being accused of conspiring to sabotage the Soviet economy with the former owners of the coal mines. The trial was conducted on May 18, 1928, in House of Trade Unions, Moscow. Thirty-four of the accused received prison terms, while eleven were sentenced to death (with six being executed; the rest received commutations). The remainder were acquitted or received suspended sentences.

== Trial ==
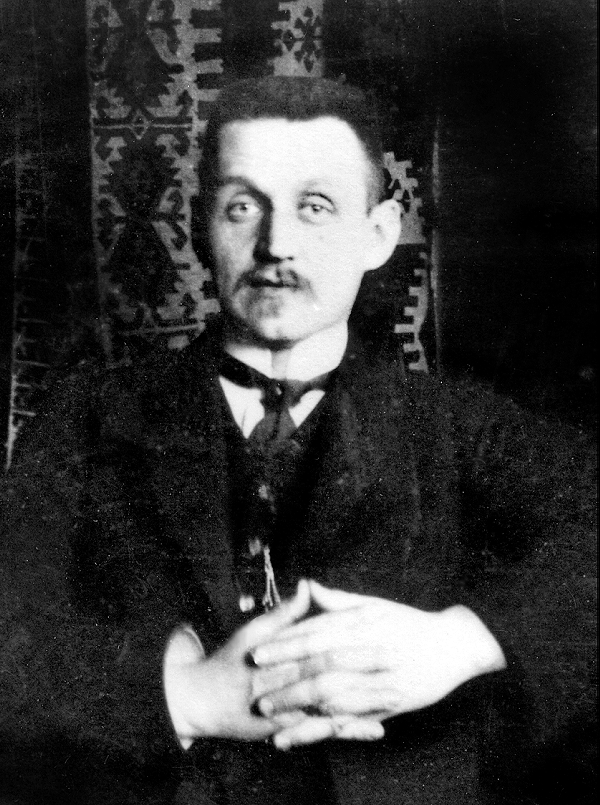
Peter Palchinsky, 1913

In 1928, the local OGPU arrested a group of engineers, including Peter Palchinsky, Nikolai von Meck and A. F. Velichko, in the North Caucasus town of Shakhty, accusing them of conspiring with former owners of coal mines, who were living abroad and barred from the Soviet Union since the Revolution, to sabotage the Soviet economy. The group was charged with a multitude of crimes, including planning the explosions in the mines, buying equipment from foreign companies that was not needed, incorrectly administering labor laws and safety protocols, and failing to properly set up new mines. The architect of these arrests and interrogations was Yefim Yevdokimov. Although he retired from the OGPU in 1931, he later led a secret police team within the NKVD itself. Among those accused in similar trials and executed was Nikolai Karlovich von Meck, Tchaikovsky's nephew by marriage, who was accused of "wrecking" the state railway system. The trial marked the beginning of "wrecking" as a crime within the Soviet Union, as found in Article 58 (RSFSR Penal Code).

They picked this Palchinsky to be the chief defendant in a grandiose new trial. However, the [prosecutor] Krylenko, stepping into what was for him a new field — engineering — not only knew nothing about the resistance of materials but could not even conceive of the potential resistance of souls . . . despite ten years of already sensational activity as a prosecutor. Krylenko's choice turned out to be a mistake. Palchinsky resisted every pressure the OGPU knew—and did not surrender; in fact, he died without signing any sort of nonsense at all. N. K. von Meek and A. F. Velichko were subjected to torture with him, and they, too, appear not to have given in.

—

== Implications ==
The Shakhty trials marked the beginning of a long series of accusations against class enemies within the Soviet Union, and were to become a hallmark of the Great Purge of the 1930s. In the 1920s under the leadership of Joseph Stalin the Soviet Union began to move away from the policies of the New Economic Policy (NEP) introduced by Vladimir Lenin, introducing a series of Five-Year Plans with an emphasis on rapid industrialization. By the end of the 1920s, Soviet industry suffered from a high rate of industrial accidents caused by the forceful execution of unrealistic production plans and low management skills of the politically appointed directors. Stalin, however, saw this as an opportunity to clean up the management of "the old specialists", professionals whose skills were critical to the industry but were not sufficiently engaged with communism politically. In his 1923-1925 speeches, he frequently expressed hostility to this group, and inspired public resentment against them, for example, based on their relatively high earnings. Accusing them of "sabotage" was a convenient way of replacing "the old specialists" with people with more appropriate political views.

The trials constituted a shift in policy toward the intelligentsia, the "bourgeois specialists" that had previously been tolerated and protected due to their needed skills, to then be replaced by the "young proletarian communist specialist". This marked the use of the concept of class warfare to motivate changes in soviet culture.

In a series of articles in 1928, the newspaper Pravda used the arrests to announce that the bourgeoisie were using sabotage as a method of class struggle. Stalin mentioned later that the Shakhty arrests proved that class struggle was intensifying as the Soviet Union moved closer to socialism.

== Response of the general populace ==
The trial caused the worker population to turn on engineers, factory administrators and technicians. The worker population already had issues with the companies they worked for due to low wages and poor working conditions. The trial contributed to their distrust and resentment towards them. This also caused a trend of support for the government. The Soviet government used the resentment the low level workers had to gain their support of the government. During and after the trial there was an increase of government industrial loan bond purchases by low level workers. The trial also created a fear that Germans and revolutionaries were threatening the country.

German Secretary of the state Karl von Shubert felt that the Soviet Union handling of the Shakty trials was wrong. He felt Russia should have informed them of these crimes. If the crimes fit the bill then the Germans could have been deported from Russia but that wasn't the case.

== Aftermath ==
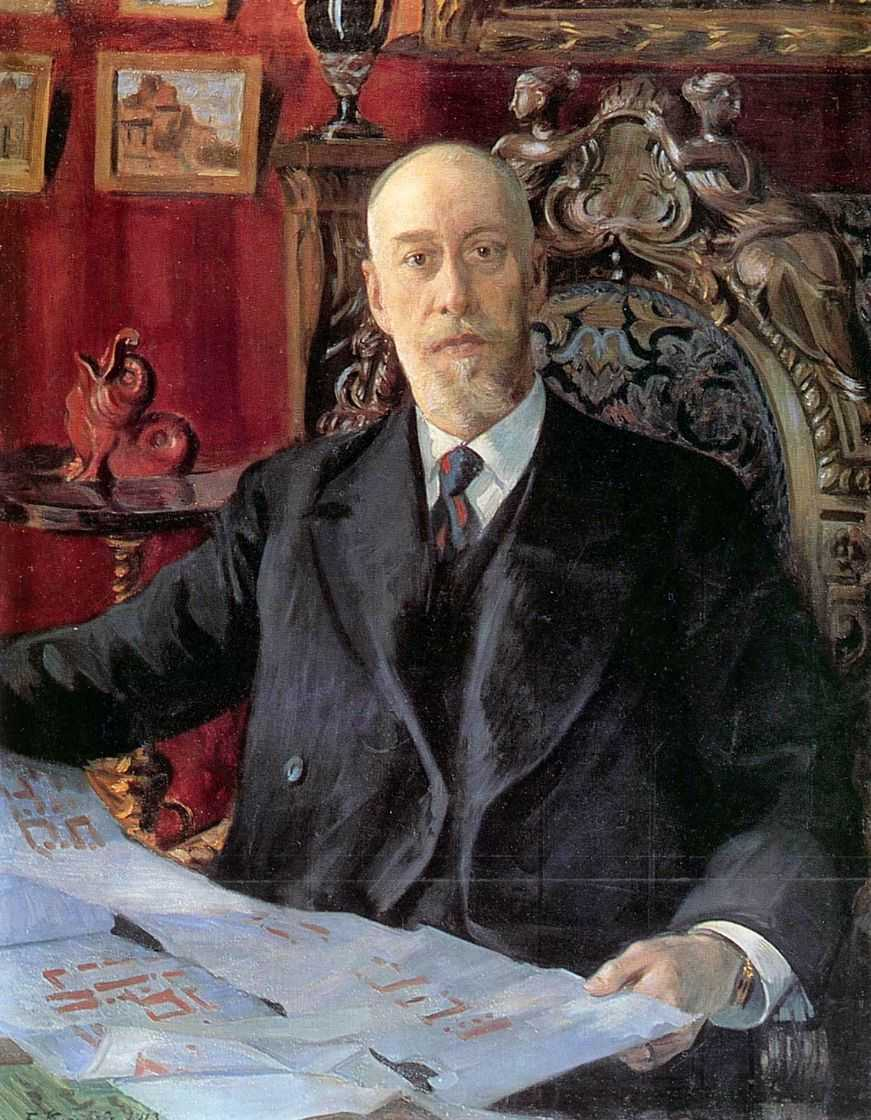
Oil painting of Nikolai von Meck by Boris Kustodiev.

The trial resulted in eleven of the fifty-three accused engineers being sentenced to death. Thirty-four were sent to prison, four were acquitted and four were given suspended sentences. Six of the death sentences were commuted as reward for their confessions. Peter Palchinsky was executed in 1929 for his political positions, as well as Nikolai Karlovich von Meck, Tchaikovsky's nephew by marriage, who was accused of "wrecking" the state railway system. The trial marked the beginning of "wrecking" as a crime within the Soviet Union, as found in Article 58 (RSFSR Penal Code).

Following the Shakhty Trials came a flood of social expulsion, primarily in secondary schools. Any children who were part of an illegal social organization, such as religious groups or the Boy Scouts, would be expelled. With the rise of the academic basis, many universities began implementing social discrimination in enrollment as political and social criteria took over. The Central Committee stated that more communists should be enrolled into the universities and that control over the technical faculties and schools should be transferred over to the Vesenkha. This helped lead to the creation of a new group of intelligentsia elites of "cultured and educated workers" that included later soviet leaders Khrushchev and Brezhnev.

Nikolai Bukharin, Alexei Rykov, and Mikhail Tomsky opposed Stalin's new policy on repression from within the Politburo, but Stalin insisted that international capital was trying to "weaken our economic power by means of invisible economic intervention, not always obvious but fairly serious, organizing sabotage, planning all kinds of 'crises' in one branch of industry or another, and thus facilitating the possibility of future military intervention". He said: "We have internal enemies. We have external enemies. We cannot forget this for a moment." Bukharin and Rykov were tried and convicted of treason in 1937 in one of the Moscow Show Trials, similar to the Shakhty Trial. These show trials were used as a means of presenting to the soviet people what was perceived as major threats to the Soviet Union. This played an important part in creating the cultural atmosphere leading to the Great Purge in the 1930s.

Fifty Russian and three German technicians and engineers from the coal industry were to be tried publicly on charges of counter-revolutionary sabotage and espionage... This was Revolutionary Justice... the same Revolutionary Justice that had presided over the guillotine in the French Terror... the accused men were coming into the court pre-judged... We waited in vain for a genuine piece of impersonal and unimpeachable testimony... that did not carry the suspicion of G.P.U. extortion. The "far-reaching international intrigue" never did emerge... Only a very few [of the accused], among them two aged Jews, Rabinovich and Imineetov, retained their self-respect intact. Imineetov said, "One day another Zola will arise and will write another J'Accuse to restore our names to honor."

— Lyons, Eugene (1937), Assignment in Utopia, Transaction Publishers, pp. 114–133, ISBN 978-0887388569

== See also ==
- List of show trials in the Soviet Union
- Industrial Party Trial of 1930
- Sharashka
- Metro-Vickers Affair of 1933
- Political repression in the Soviet Union
- The Ghost of the Executed Engineer
- Jack Littlepage (1894–1948) American mining engineer who helped the Soviet gold industry (1929–1937).
- Alexander Pavlovitch Serebrovsky (1884–1938) Soviet petroleum and mining engineer executed during the Great Purge.
