= With God in Russia =

1964 memoir by Walter Ciszek

- Title page for With God in Russia (1964)
- Author: Walter Ciszek
- Genre: Memoir
- Publisher: McGraw-Hill
- Publication date: 1964

With God in Russia is a memoir by Walter Ciszek (1904–1984), a Polish-American Jesuit priest known for his clandestine missionary work in the Soviet Union between 1941 and 1963. It was originally published in 1964 by McGraw-Hill.

Since 1990, the life of Fr. Ciszek has been considered by the Roman Catholic Church for possible beatification or canonization. His current title is a Servant of God.

== Overview ==
The book begins in 1938 as Father Ciszek, who has been ordained in the Byzantine Rite, serves in a mission in a part of Poland occupied by the Soviets. He volunteers to go incognito, using the alias "Wladimir Lypinski", as a worker with Polish laborers and families enticed into Russia's interior to work in the Ural Mountains. On the way he stops in Lviv, Ukraine and gets permission for his new mission from the elderly Andrey Sheptytsky, Metropolitan Archbishop of the Ukrainian Greek Catholic Church.

In 1940 he reaches his destination, a lumber camp near Chusovoy, Perm Krai, Russia. After the onset of World War II, however, the secret police (NKVD) identify Ciszek as a priest and arrest him under a charge of "agitation with intent to subvert".

For the next five years Ciszek is confined to Moscow prisons, including the notorious Lubyanka, and then, without trial, is sentenced to ten more years as "a spy of the Vatican". He is then sent to labor camps north of the Arctic Circle in Dudinka and Norilsk, where he works in the mines and in construction gangs. He also takes part in Norilsk uprising in 1953.

Long presumed dead by his family and his superiors in the United States, in October 1963 Father Ciszek is exchanged along with another American for two convicted Soviet secret agents.
