= Thomas Sgovio =

American artist, ex-Communist and former inmate of a Soviet Union Gulag camp

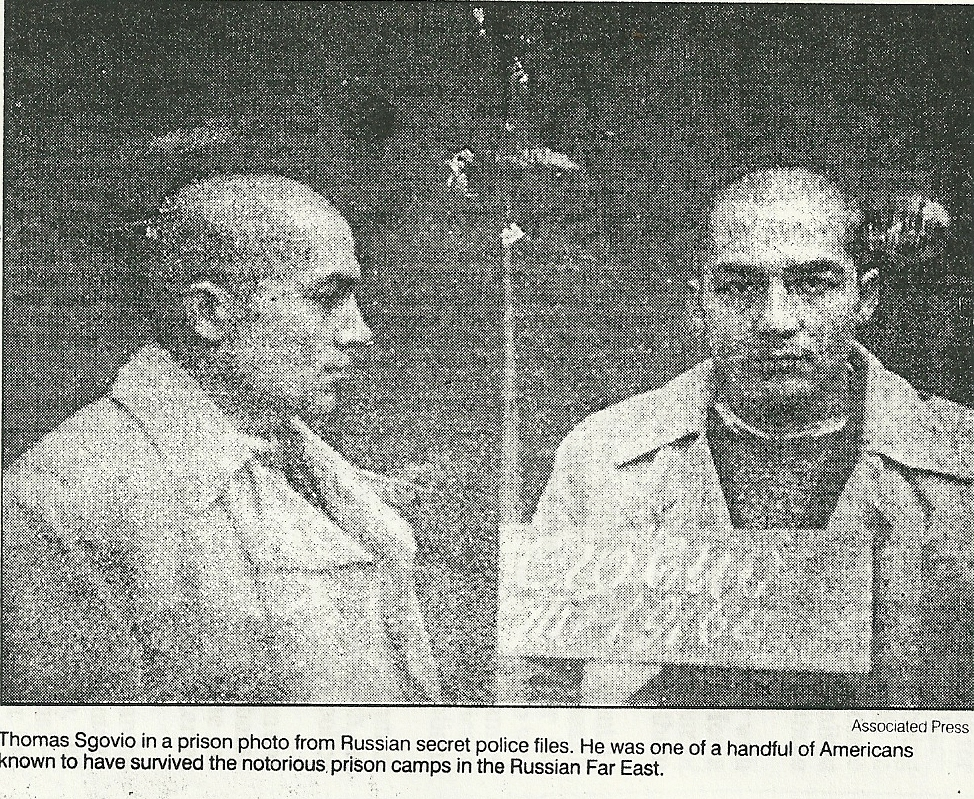
Thomas Sgovio arrest in USSR on March 21, 1938

Thomas Sgovio (7 October 1916 – 3 July 1997) was an American artist, ex-Communist, and former inmate of a Soviet Union gulag camp in Kolyma. His father was an Italian American communist, deported by the US authorities to the USSR because of his political activities.

== Biography ==
He was born in Buffalo, New York on 7 October 1916.

Sgovio moved to the USSR at the age of 19 with his father Joseph who "the United States deported as a communist agitator in 1935." On arrival in the USSR he gave up his US passport. He became disillusioned after three years living in Moscow, tried to reclaim his passport at the US embassy there and was arrested by the NKVD on 12 March 1938 as he left the embassy. After his arrest, he was first taken to Moscow's Lubyanka Prison and later transported to Taganka Prison. After a perfunctory and routine inquiry in which the Soviet authorities seem mainly to have been concerned with his attendance at the embassy, he was sentenced by a NKVD troika of three officials to forced labour as a "socially dangerous element". Some years later Sgovio sought to have his case reviewed; the prosecutor who dealt with the application concluded that, "Sgovio does not deny that he did make an application at the American Embassy. Therefore I believe that there is no reason to review Sgovio's case.

Sgovio was transported in a prison train to Vladivostok. Sgovio wrote, "Our train left Moscow on the evening of 24 June. It was the beginning of an eastward journey which was to last a month. I can never forget the moment. Seventy men ... began to cry." From Vladivostok he was shipped aboard the SS Indigirka to the Kolyma camps.

Within the camps the professional criminals were often kept alongside and dominated the other prisoners including the political prisoners. Tattoos of various types were one of the hallmarks of the professional criminal and as a professional artist, Sgovio became part of the tattoo trade. For a while Sgovio was also personal orderly to a senior guard in the camp. At another time he was part of a logging brigade. During the Second World War, Sgovio learned of the conflict in the Pacific when machine parts wrapped in old newspapers arrived in the Gulag having been diverted from the US Lend-Lease program with the USSR. He witnessed and later wrote about the starvation and deaths of countless Gulag prisoners and victims of the Soviet authorities.

Sgovio survived his ordeal. After a 16-year sentence in labor camps, he was released but initially had to remain in the USSR where he was stigmatised as a former prisoner. Eventually he was permitted to return to the United States in 1960. He related his experiences and the lethal nature of the camps in his memoir, Dear America! Why I Turned Against Communism, published in 1972.

His fate is also recounted in Tim Tzouliadis' book The Forsaken.

== See also ==
- The Forsaken: An American Tragedy in Stalin’s Russia
- The Ghost of the Executed Engineer
- John H. Noble (1923–2007) American survivor of the Gulags
- Alexander Dolgun (1926-1986) survivor of the Soviet Gulag who returned to his native United States.
- Robert Robinson (engineer) (1907-1994) Jamaican-born toolmaker who initially worked in the US auto industry in the United States but spent 44 years in the Soviet Union.
- Victor Herman (1915-1985) Jewish-American initially known as the 'Lindbergh of Russia', who then spent 18 years in the Gulags of Siberia.
