= Patricia Graham =

American historian

- Born: 1935 (age 90–91)
- Spouse: Loren Graham (m. 1954; death 2024)

Academic work
- Discipline: History
- Sub-discipline: American education
- Institutions: Harvard University Indiana University; Barnard College Teachers College, Columbia University

Patricia Albjerg Graham (born 1935) is a historian of American education. She was the first woman to be appointed as a dean at Harvard University, serving as dean of the Harvard Graduate School of Education from 1982 to 1991.

She began her teaching career in Deep Creek High School in Virginia in 1955 and went on to become a lecturer at Indiana University, professor of history and education at Barnard College and Teachers College, Columbia University, and dean of the Radcliffe Institute and of Harvard Graduate School of Education, where she held an endowed chair. She went on to serve as president of the Spencer Foundation from 1991 to 2000. On May 28, 2015, Graham was awarded an honorary Doctor of Laws by Harvard University.

She was married to historian Loren Graham (1933–2024) for 70 years until his death.
