= Margaret Werner Tobien =

American gulag survivor (1921–1997)

- Born: Margaret Werner; 1921 near Detroit, Michigan, U.S.
- Died: 1997 (aged 75–76)
- Known for: Only American woman to survive imprisonment in a gulag
- Spouse: Gunter Tobien
- Children: 1

Margaret Werner Tobien (1921–1997) was an American woman who survived imprisonment in a gulag, a Siberian labor camp of Stalinist Russia. She escaped and became a mother to Karl Tobien, who later wrote Dancing Under the Red Star about her experience.

== Early life ==
Margaret Werner was born in 1921 near Detroit, Michigan, and her father worked for Ford Motor Company. When she was 10, Ford moved her father's work location to the Soviet Union.

When she was 17, Werner's father was arrested and imprisoned in the Soviet Union after being convicted on trumped-up charges of treason. Left to survive in the Soviet Union, Werner and her mother faced years of poverty and near starvation.

It already was a struggle for Werner and her mother to survive. They made it through years of sorrow, only to then both be accused of the same charges her father faced.

== Imprisonment ==
In 1943, Werner was accused of espionage and sentenced to 10 years of hard labor in Stalin's gulag.

The prison went on for 13 years. Margaret Werner and many women found ways to adjust to the cruel conditions they were forced to live through.

Werner is the only American woman to have survived the harsh imprisonment lifestyle.

== Personal life ==
After her release from prison, Margaret married Gunter Tobien. Their son, Karl Tobien, was born in 1956 just outside the Gulag. He was five years old when he, his mother, and his grandmother returned to the US.

In 1991, Tobien converted to evangelical Christianity.

As Karl grew older he wanted to know about his mother's past. She told him about the cruel conditions she faced. Karl later wrote Dancing Under the Red Star, which told his mother's story.
