= Wrecking (crime) =

Crime of sabotage in the Soviet Union

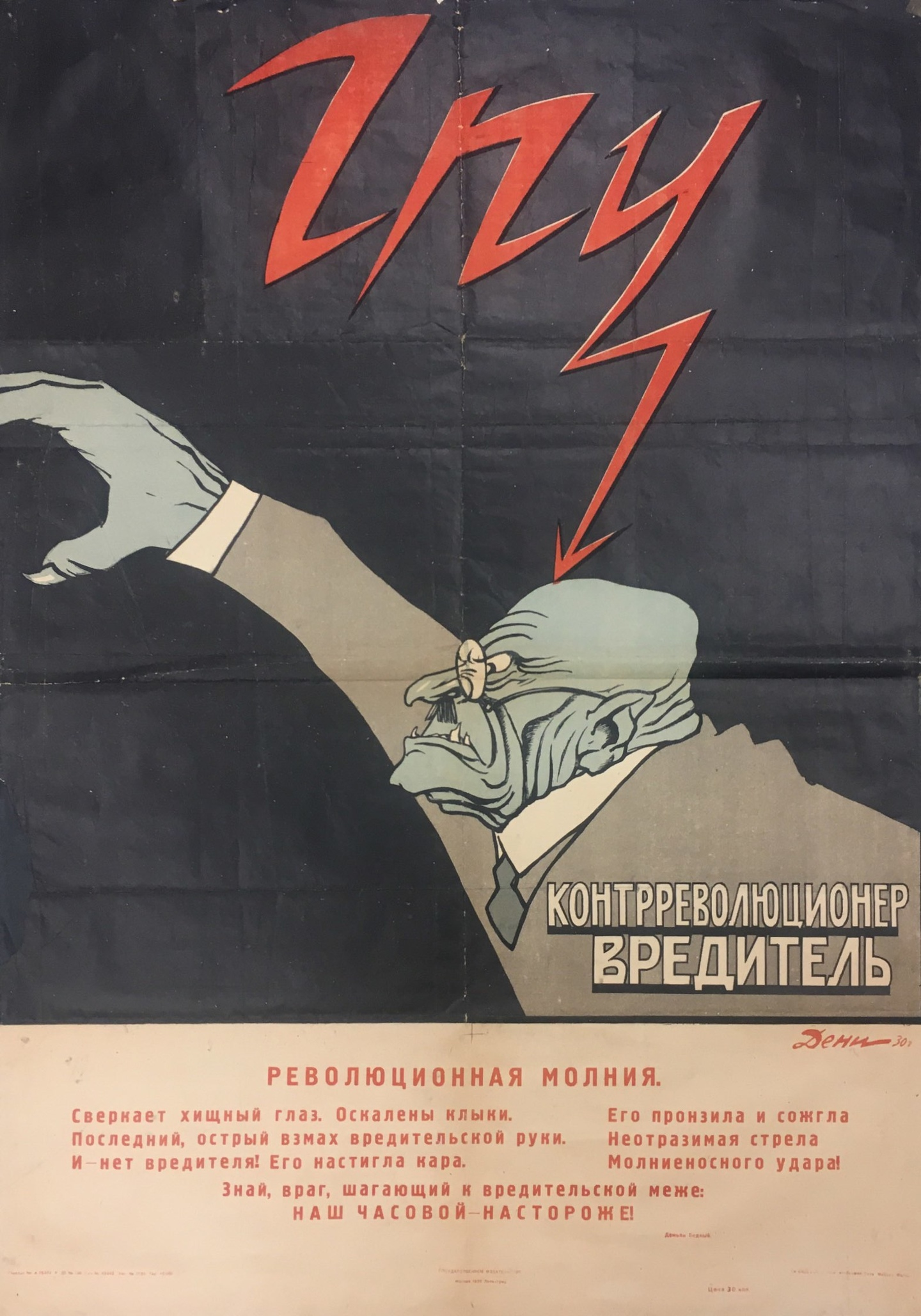
A 1930s Soviet poster showing GPU striking at a "counter-revolutionary wrecker"

Wrecking (Russian: вредительство or vreditel'stvo [vrʲɪˈdʲitʲɪlʲstvə], lit. "inflicting damage", "harming") was a crime specified in the criminal code of the Soviet Union in the Stalin era. It is often translated as "sabotage"; however, "wrecking", "diversionist acts", and "counter-revolutionary sabotage" were distinct sub-articles of Article 58 (RSFSR Penal Code) (58-7, 58–9, and 58-14 respectively); the meaning of "wrecking" is closer to "undermining".

== Types ==
Kazakh construction workers at the junction of the Turkestan–Siberia Railway in 1930 holding a banner denouncing "wreckers"

Distinctions among the three categories in the sub-articles:

- 58-7: Wrecking was acts "with counter-revolutionary purposes" aimed against normal functioning of state and cooperative organisations, monetary and credit systems, such as giving deliberately wrong commands, counteracting their normal functioning, as well as acting in the interests of the former capitalist owners.
- 58-9: Infliction of physical damage to state and cooperative property "with counter-revolutionary purposes".
- 58-14 (added in 1927): "Counter-revolutionary sabotage" was non-execution, or careless execution, of one's duties.

As applied in practice, "wrecking" and "sabotage" referred to any action which negatively affected the economy, including failing to meet unrealistic economic targets, allegedly causing poor morale among subordinates (e.g. by complaining about conditions of work), lack of effort, or other incompetence. Thus, it referred to economic or industrial sabotage in the very broadest sense. The definition of sabotage was interpreted dialectically and indirectly, so any form of non-compliance with Party directives could have been considered a 'sabotage'.

== Notable cases ==
=== Show trials for wrecking cases ===
- 1928: Shakhty Trial
- 1930: Industrial Party Trial
- 1933: Metro-Vickers Affair

==== Soviet census of 1937 ====
One of the show trials involving charges of "wrecking" was that of official coordinators of the 1937 Soviet census. The census was organised with great expectations from the government that it would confirm the superiority of the Soviet economic and social model, with Stalin publicly declaring in 1934 that the Soviet Union was gaining at least 3 million citizens per year. The census questions and procedure were prepared for several years by a commission of professional statisticians and demographers, but then significantly changed by Stalin and other members of the Central Committee to better match their political goals. The collection phase of the census was shortened and its procedures simplified.

The results obtained from the census were at least 8 million people short of the expected outcome and immediately classified. The formal organizers were accused of "wrecking" and sent to camps, and the shortage was officially presented as being caused by their negligence and acts of sabotage. The actual measurement error, as estimated by statisticians in the 1990s, did not exceed 1.5%, and the disappointing result was caused by the huge loss of life that occurred during collectivization, the Famine of 1932–1933, including in Ukraine (Holodomor), and the mortality rates of the Gulag.

=== Persecution of scientists ===
During the Lysenkovshchina, the charge of "wrecking" was frequently invoked against biologists and agronomists who criticised the pseudoscientific claims of Trofim Lysenko.

=== Individual cases ===
- 1928: Nikolai von Meck, accused of wrecking on the railroad transport. He "confessed" in providing consultations which had led to actual wrecking. Executed in May 1929.
- 1931: Vladimir V. Tchernavin
- 1936: Nikolai Glebov-Avilov
- 1938, 1940: Nikolay Urvantsev
