= Loren Graham =

American historian of science (1933–2024)

Loren R. Graham (June 29, 1933 – December 15, 2024) was an American historian of science, particularly science in Russia.

== Early life and career ==
Graham was born on June 29, 1933. He earned his B.A. in chemical engineering from Purdue University in 1955. He worked briefly as an engineer at Dow Chemical's central plant in Midland, Michigan, before serving for three years as a communications and intelligence officer in the United States Navy during a tense period of the Cold War. He then pursued graduate studies in history of science and technology at Columbia University, receiving his M.A. degree in 1960 along with a certificate in Russian studies from the Russian Institute. As part of an early academic exchange program between the United States and the Soviet Union, he studied at Moscow State University under the tutelage of Valentina Bessonova from 1960 to 1961. He completed his Ph.D. dissertation in history on The transformation of Russian science and the Academy of Sciences, 1927–1932 under the guidance of Henry L. Roberts and Alexander Dallin at Columbia in 1964.

He taught history at Indiana University from 1964, before rejoining the history department and the Russian Institute at Columbia University as a faculty member in 1967. In 1978, he moved to the Massachusetts Institute of Technology, where he remained until his retirement. He was affiliated to Harvard University's Russian Research Center (later Davis Center) for 46 years, serving on its executive committee for a number of years and as its acting director in 1995–1996.

He wrote a popular book on Native American history (A Face in the Rock) and a memoir (Moscow Stories) which describes his youth in the United States and his adventures in Russia. He was also a strong supporter of human rights and scholarship. He was a member of the board of trustees of the Soros Foundation.

For many years he was a member of the Governing Council of the Program on Basic Research and Higher Education, which supports the combining of research and teaching in Russian universities and is financially supported by the MacArthur Foundation, the Carnegie Corporation, the Russian Ministry of Science and Education, and local groups in Russia. He was a member of the advisory council of the U.S. Civilian Research & Development Foundation, which supports international scientific collaboration.

For many years he was a member of the board of trustees of the European University at St. Petersburg and still served on the board of a body raising money for that university as of 2024. He donated several thousand books from his library to the European University which established a special collection in his name.

In much of his work in the history of science, Graham demonstrated the influence of social context on science, even its theoretical structure. For example, in his Science and Philosophy in the Soviet Union (which was a finalist for a National Book Award) he delineated the influence of Marxism on science in Russia — in some cases, such as the Lysenko Affair, deleterious, but, in other cases, particularly in physics, psychology, and origin of life studies, positive.

In addition to writing on the history of scientific theories, Graham wrote much on the organization of science in Russia and the Soviet Union, including a book on the early history of the Soviet Academy of Sciences (The Soviet Academy of Sciences and the Communist Party) and a more recent one on the situation of science in Russia after the collapse of the Soviet Union (Science in the New Russia; co-written with Irina Dezhina).

== Personal life and death ==
Graham's wife Patricia Graham is a prominent historian of education and a former dean at Harvard University.

Loren Graham died on December 15, 2024, at the age of 91.

== Awards and recognition ==
Graham was granted an honorary doctorate by Purdue University in 1986.

In 1996, he received the George Sarton Medal of the History of Science Society. In 2000, he received the Follo Award of the Michigan Historical Society for his contributions to Michigan history.

In 2012, he was awarded a medal by the Russian Academy of Sciences at a ceremony in Moscow for "contributions to the history of science".

Graham was a member of a number of honorary societies, both American and foreign, including the American Philosophical Society, the American Academy of Arts and Sciences, and the Russian Academy of Natural Science. His books have been published in English, Italian, German, Russian, Spanish, French, Japanese, Greek, Persian, Korean and Chinese.

== Works ==
Major books

- Moscow in May 1963: Education and Cybernetics (with Oliver Caldwell), Washington, 1964
- The Soviet Academy of Sciences and the Communist Party, 1927—1932, Princeton University Press, 1967
- Science and Philosophy in the Soviet Union, Alfred Knopf, 1972
- Between Science and Values, Columbia University Press, 1981
- Science in Russia and the Soviet Union: A Short History, Cambridge University Press, 1993; Graham, Loren R. (April 26, 1993). 1994 pbk edition. Cambridge University Press. ISBN 9780521287890. brief description;
- Functions and Uses of Disciplinary Histories (edited with Wolf Lepenies and Peter Weingart), Reidel, 1983
- Red Star: The First Bolshevik Utopia, by Alexander Bogdanov (edited with Richard Stites), Indiana University Press, 1984
- Science, Philosophy, and Human Behavior in the Soviet Union, Columbia University Press, 1987
- Science and the Soviet Social Order (edited), Harvard University Press, 1990
- The Ghost of the Executed Engineer, Harvard University Press, 1993
- A Face in the Rock: the Tale of a Grand Island Chippewa], University of California, 1995 LCCN 94-46253 ISBN 1559633662; Graham, Loren R. (August 10, 1998). 1998 pbk edition. University of California Press. ISBN 978-0-520-21567-2.
- What Have We Learned about Science and Technology from the Russian Experience?, Stanford University Press, 1998
- Moscow Stories, Indiana University Press, 2006 LCCN 2005-22442 ISBN 0253347165
- Grand Island and its Families (with Katherine Geffine Carlson) GIA, 2007
- Science in the New Russia: Crisis, Aid, Reform (with Irina Dezhina), Indiana University Press, 2008
- Naming Infinity: A True Story of Religious Mysticism and Mathematical Creativity, with Jean-Michel Kantor Harvard University Press, 2009 ISBN 9780674032934 brief description
- Lonely Ideas: Can Russia Compete? MIT Press, 2013 ISBN 978-0-262-01979-8
- Death at the Lighthouse: A Grand Island Riddle, Arbutus Press, 2013 ISBN 193392652X
- Lysenko's Ghost: Epigenetics and Russia, Harvard University Press, 2016 ISBN 9780674089051

Articles

- "What the Reappraisal of Soviet Russia's Top Agricultural Mastermind Says About Putin's Russia" Foreign Affairs (2016)

== Sources ==
Biographical material and professional details for Loren Graham may be found in:

- Loren Graham and Jean-Michel Kantor, 'A Comparison of Two Cultural Approaches to Mathematics', ISIS 97 (2006), pp 56–74. See 'Notes on Contributors' published in the same issue.
- Loren Graham and Jean-Michel Kantor, 'Russian Religious Mystics and French Rationalists: Mathematics, 1900—1930', Bulletin of the Georgian National Academy of Sciences, New Series 1 (175), no. 4 (2007), pp. 44–52.
- Massachusetts Institute of Technology bio (with photo)
- Mark Kramer, 'A Tribute to Loren Graham (1933-2024)' // Davis Center for Russian and Eurasian Studies, December 18, 2024.
