= The Forsaken: An American Tragedy in Stalin's Russia =

2008 book by Tim Tzouliadis

- Author: Tim Tzouliadis
- Language: English
- Publisher: Penguin Books
- Publication date: June 30, 2009
- Publication place: United States
- Media type: Print (Softcover)
- Pages: 448
- ISBN: 978-0143115427

The Forsaken: An American Tragedy in Stalin's Russia by Tim Tzouliadis is a 2008 book published by Penguin Books. It tells the story of thousands of Americans who immigrated to the Soviet Union in the 1930s.

== Background ==
=== Immigration ===
In the first 8 months of 1931, a Soviet trade agency in New York advertised 6,000 positions and received more than 100,000 applications. 10,000 Americans were hired in 1931, part of the official "organized emigration".

In February 1931, Walter Duranty, a New York Times reporter sympathetic to the USSR reported:

The Soviet Union will witness in the next few years an immigration flood comparable to the influx into the United States in the decade before the World War...It is only the beginning as yet of this movement, and the first swallows of the coming migration are scarce... But it has begun and will have to be reckoned with in the future....

When the day comes that foreign workers here may write home and say, 'Things are pretty good here, why don't you come along? There are jobs for everybody and plenty to eat. Russia is not so bad a place in which to live and there are no lay-offs or short time and you get all that is coming to you'&emdash;then immigration to the Soviet Union will begin to rival the flood that poured into America.

At the present rate of progress that day is not far distant.

In March 1932, The New York Times reported that immigration to the Soviet Union was 1000 a week, but increasing.

Soon, an official edict was issued that in the future all Americans must carry a round-trip ticket and would no longer be given jobs, simply because there was not enough space to house them all. Moscow and all the major Russian cities were already overcrowded.

The Foreign Workers' Club of Moscow baseball team, a group of Americans, played regular games in Gorky Park.

In the summer of 1932, the Soviet Supreme Council of Physical Culture announced its decision to introduce baseball to the Soviet Union as a "national sport".

The American immigrants opened an Anglo-American school in Moscow, with 125 pupils on the register by November 1932, three quarters of them born in the United States. Over the next three years, enrollment rose so high that the Anglo-American school moved into a larger school, School Number 24 on Great Vuysovsky Street.

=== Gulag imprisonment and executions ===
By 1937, many of the Americans were arrested alongside untold numbers of Soviet citizens. Some were executed. Others were sent to "corrective labor" camps in the Gulag where they were worked to death.

As documented by Tzouliadis, they were essentially abandoned by the U.S. government and its diplomats in Moscow.

== Reception ==
The book was praised for bringing public awareness to American emigration to the Soviet Union in the wake of the great depression and the presence of American citizens in the Gulag system. Reviewers found the life stories of individuals in the Soviet Union to be engaging and well-told. The book's style has been described as "journalistic", like a movie script, or compared to Robert Conquest and Anne Applebaum's Gulag.

Reviewer Alex Marshall describes the book as repeating outdated Cold War-era historiography. She critiques the book's strong reliance on American sources, including unreliable McCarthy-era ones, while failing to utilize the Russian archives and recent research. Tzouliadis doesn't know the Russian language, but did commission Russian speakers to do interviews and archival work in Russia.

In the book, Tzouliadis expresses passionate indignation against American public figures and government officials who he feels should have acted to support and defend their compatriots in the Soviet Union. Marshall asserted that Tzouliadis' animosity toward the Roosevelt administration overcame his analysis, sweepingly denigrating every official without exception, and offering a confusingly alleging the administration was "simultaneously naive, hopelessly corrupt, and infiltrated".

Reviewers found the book unfocused, covering personal stories of Americans in the Soviet Union, Soviet-American government relations, the history of the Soviet Union, and American public figures who spoke well of the Soviet Union. Only the first of these topics was done well. Marshall says "his treatment of the Soviet-American bilateral relationship... never rises above a grim caricature of reality". The book was regarded as lacking in nuance.

== See also ==
- Americans in the Gulag
- Victor Herman - An American who was imprisoned in Gulag camps
- Robert Robinson (engineer)
- The Eternal Road (film)
