= Peter Demant =

Soviet writer and essayist

- Born: Peter Demant; 22 August 1918; Innsbruck, County of Tyrol, Austria-Hungary
- Died: 11 December 2006 (aged 88); Moscow, Russia
- Occupations: Novelist, short story writer, essayist
- Spouse: Irina Veсhnaya
- Writing career
- Pen name: Vernon Kress
- Language: Russian
- Period: 1991–2006
- Notable works: "Zekameron of the 20th Century" ("Зекамерон XX века"), a memoir “My First Life” ("Моя первая жизнь"), a memoir

Peter Demant (in Russian – Петр Зигмундович Демант) (literary pseudonym – Vernon Kress (in Russian – Вернон Кресс) (22 August 1918, Innsbruck, Austria – 11 December 2006, Moscow, Russia) was a Russian writer and public figure.

== Family ==
Peter Demant was born to an assimilated Jewish family. His mother, Paula Schweizer-Demant (1896–1941) in her youth was a famous writer Peter Altenberg's intimate friend. Peter Altenberg dedicated two books to her: "Nachfechsung" (1916) and "Vita ipsa" (1917). Yet in 1917 she married a doctor and a career military officer in the Austro-Hungarian (later – Austrian) army, Siegmund Demant (1887–1942), and moved to Innsbruck, Austria, and later to Natters. Zigmund Demant was born in Ternopil (now in Ukraine) to a family of a local lawyer, Moritz Demant, who moved to Czernowitz not later than 1898, and was working there as a financial adviser (Oberrechnungsrat). Zigmund Demant was studying in Czernowitz, Bukovina (currently Ukraine, and in the Vienna university from 1914. He appeared in a novel "Radetzky March" by Joseph Roth (1932). His sister, Charlotte Eisler-Demant (1894–1970) was married to a composer Hanns Eisler. Demants were leading bohemian lifestyle. Their close friend was ballerina Grete Wiesenthal. In 1919 Demants settled in Czernowitz in the Greater Romania by then.

== Biography ==
Peter Demant spent his childhood and youth in Czernowitz. He studied at a German secondary school, then at the Universities of Brno, Czechoslovakia, and Aachen, Germany. In 1939, when North Bukovina became part of the Soviet Union, he worked at the local museum of Natural History.

On 13 June 1941 he was arrested by the NKVD and on 18 June he was exiled to Siberia along with his family, which perished on the way: mother Paula and his mother's second husband Arthur. Later, during the German occupation his father Dr. Siegmund Demant, his new wife, Gisela, and an infant daughter, Gerda, perished in a Nazi concentration camp in Transnistria, too. On the way to Siberia Peter Demant escaped, but was caught 5 months later, accused of spying for Austria, and sentenced to 10 years in a hard labor camp, plus additional 5 years of exile.

Although being freed in 1953 on an amnesty, the KGB made him work as a loader in the seaport of Magadan in the vicinity of Siberian peninsula Kamchatka, for 23 years. Peter possessed two University degrees, knew several languages, and had technical skills that were at the time scarce in that region, but the KGB did not factor these facts into their decision. While staying in Siberia Peter kept a Post Restante address and was in touch with his sister Erni-Zita Rauchwerger in Israel and with many of his friends who supplied him with the latest books, musical records and news of the world and family. Eventually Peter was allowed to return to European portion of the Soviet Union, to the Crimean region.

Peter then married Irina Vechnaya, and therefore was able to leave Crimea for Moscow, where his wife resided. All the charges against him were dropped in 1991, and he was able to travel abroad. He traveled throughout the world – Far East, Africa, Middle East, he repeatedly visited surviving members of his family – his sister Erni-Zita in Ramat Gan, Israel, and his niece – Erni's daughter, Dr. Tamar Erika Ben-Ami in the United States.

Peter Demant was named an honorable member of the Russian society “Memorial,” dedicated to recording and publicizing Soviet Union’s totalitarian past and human rights abuses.

== Literary works ==
- “Aunt Sarah’s Mirror” ("Зеркало тети Сары"), a novel
- “Montana’s Gold” ("Золото Монтаны"), a novel
- “In Passing” ("Мимоходом"), a memoir
- “My First Life” ("Моя первая жизнь"), a memoir
- “My Three Steamships” ("Мои три парохода"), a memoir
- "Zekameron of the 20th Century" ("Зекамерон XX века"), a memoir
- Short story and essay collections: “Idol” ("Идол"), “Terekhov’s Career” ("Карьера Терехова"), “Siberian Mirages” ("Сибирские миражи")
