= The Ghost of the Executed Engineer =

1993 book by Loren Graham

- Author: Loren Graham
- Publisher: Harvard University Press
- Publication date: 1993
- Media type: Hardcover
- Pages: 128
- ISBN: 9780674354364

The Ghost of the Executed Engineer: Technology and the Fall of the Soviet Union is a documentary book written by Loren Graham, an MIT professor specializing in the history of modern Russian science that criticizes the direction of Soviet industrialization. Published by the Harvard University Press in 1993, it describes the life of Peter Palchinsky, in whom it personifies the struggles and misfortunes of Soviet industrialization.

== Peter Palchinsky ==
Palchinsky was born in 1875 in a city on the Volga, Kazan. He was a mining engineer who wanted to take a more humanitarian approach to engineering than the communist government desired. His life is used in this book as a focus for the subject.

== Technology in the Soviet Union ==
Stalin's vision for the Soviet Union and industrialization was very different from Palchinsky's. Joseph Stalin had an ideological outlook for economic advancement in the Soviet Union that set unrealistic goals that required massive human effort. Stalin emphasized that all industrial establishments should be of great size (preferable the largest in the world). This came to be known as "gigantomania" by the Western observers. The results of taking on these astronomical industrial establishments were high accident rates and shoddy production. The high death rate and exposure to disease was an acceptable cost for Stalin. Stalin's motto was that "technology decides everything" no matter at what cost. Even though Palchinsky supported the overall goal of industrial development, he advocated for realistic policy goals and attention to human needs.

After Peter's death, in 1929 the Soviet Union launched the first five-year plan, a list of economic goals that was designed to strengthen the economy. Three of the monumental projects in the early Five-Year Plans were the building of the world's largest hydroelectric plant on the Dnieper River, the construction of the world's largest steel plant (Magnitogorski) and the digging of the White Sea Canal. These Soviet industrialization projects were greatly flawed and wasteful, costing many people who worked both voluntarily and involuntarily their lives.

USSR Engineering Disasters from The Ghost of the Executed Engineer.

=== Dnieper Dam Power Plant ===
Many engineers, including Peter Palchinsky warned the USSR not to rush and go ahead with the building of the dam. They argued that the water flow was ultimately going to be too slow and no good studies had been made of the flow patterns of surface and underground water in the area. Ultimately, 10,000 farmers were forced out of their farmland with little or no compensation, and those who did not volunteer to work on the project were forced to do so. As the project proceeded, it fell behind on schedule and grossly exceeded the estimated costs. Worker needs were neglected and they lived and worked under unbearable conditions. Destroyed and rebuilt twice after World War II, it has been expanded several times and is still in operation today as one of six hydroelectric dams on the Dnieper River.

=== Magnitogorsk ("Steel City") ===
Construction began in 1929 at the site of one of the country's richest iron deposits, known as Magnetic Mountain. Peter Palchinsky published articles in 1926 and 1927 complaining that the Soviet government was going ahead with plans for the construction of the mining plant without adequate studies of geological resources, availability of labor, economics of transportation and supplying proper housing for the work force. Workers were promised a "garden city" away from industry and instead got barracks with open sewers directly in the path of blast furnace fumes.

In 1987 Stephen Kotkin was the first American to give a detailed account of life at Magnitogorsk since John Scott. Kotkin found a dirty and dispirited city surrounding hopelessly obsolescent steel mills, far from the "garden city" anyone expected.

=== White Sea Canal ===
The building of the White Sea Canal was described as a complete nightmare. It ignored the engineering principles of Palchinsky and was also an obscene violation of human rights. Almost all workers were prisoners and more than 20,000 died during construction. The Canal would freeze half the year, and water was too low in the dry summers. It failed to live up to its specifications from the beginning. After World War II, an improved canal was built parallel to the first one.

== See also ==
- Jack Littlepage (1894–1948) – American mining engineer who helped the Soviet gold industry (1929–37).
- Robert Robinson (engineer) (1907–1994) – Jamaican-born toolmaker who initially worked in the US auto industry in the United States but spent 44 years in the Soviet Union.
- Shakhty Trial
