= Walter Ciszek =

Polish-American Jesuit priest and missionary in the Soviet Union (1904–1984)

Servant of God Walter Ciszek SJ
- Born: Walter Joseph Ciszek; November 4, 1904; Shenandoah, Pennsylvania, U.S.
- Died: December 8, 1984 (aged 80); Bronx, New York, U.S.

Religious life
- Religion: Chrisitianity
- Denomination: Catholic Church
- Order: Society of Jesus
- Ordination: 1937 (priest)

Walter Joseph Ciszek, S.J. (November 4, 1904 – December 8, 1984) was a Polish-American Jesuit priest of the Russian Greek Catholic Church who clandestinely conducted missionary work in the Soviet Union between 1939 and 1963.

Fifteen of these years were spent in confinement and hard labor in the Gulag, plus five preceding them in Moscow's infamous Lubyanka prison. He was released and returned to the United States in 1963, after which he wrote two books, He Leadeth Me and the memoir With God in Russia, and served as a spiritual director.

Ciszek's cause for canonization was opened in 1990 and was suspended in 2026.

== Early life and studies ==
Ciszek was born on November 4, 1904, in the mining town of Shenandoah, Pennsylvania, to Polish immigrants Mary (Mika) and Martin Ciszek, who had emigrated to the US in the 1890s from Galicia in Austria-Hungary. A former street gang member, he shocked his family by deciding to become a priest. Ciszek entered the Jesuit novitiate in Hyde Park, New York in 1928. The following year, he volunteered to serve as a missionary to Russia, where the Bolshevik Revolution had taken place 12 years before. Christians were being openly persecuted there, and few believers had access to a priest. Pope Pius XI made an appeal to priests from around the world to go to Russia as missionaries.

In 1934, Ciszek was sent to Rome to study theology, Russian, the history of Russia and liturgy at the Pontifical Russian College (or 'Russicum'), a Jesuit-run seminary established to train priests of the Russian Greek Catholic Church for missionary work in the Soviet Union and the Russian diaspora.

His fellow Russicum seminarians included Alexander Kurtna, a convert from Estonian Orthodoxy whom Ciszek referred to in his memoirs only by the codename "Misha". Following his expulsion by the Russicum's rector in 1940, Kurtna worked, with only one interruption between 1940 and 1944, as a translator for the Vatican's Congregation for the Eastern Churches. At the same time, he spied for the Soviet NKVD, with devastating results for Ciszek and many other underground priests and faithful. Kurtna, who was loyal to the USSR, started spying for Nazi Germany in 1943 because his handler and Obersturmbannführer of the SS, Herbert Kappler, threatened to send him and his wife to a concentration camp. Kurtna however betrayed Kappler by stealing codebooks from his office and passing them to the Soviets. Kurtna and Ciszek met one another again in 1948 as fellow political prisoners in Norillag.

In 1937, Ciszek was ordained a priest in the Byzantine Rite in Rome and took the name Vladimir. In 1938, Ciszek was sent to the Jesuit mission in Albertyn in eastern Poland. With the outbreak of World War II in 1939, the Soviet Union occupied eastern Poland and forced him to close his mission. Arriving in Lviv, he realized that it would be easy for a priest to enter the Soviet Union amid the streams of exiles going east. After securing the permission of Metropolitan Andrei Sheptytsky, he crossed the border in 1940 under the assumed identity of Władymyr Łypynski. With two of his fellow Jesuits, he traveled 2,400 kilometres (1,500 mi) by train to the logging town of Chusovoy, in the Ural Mountains. For one year, he worked as an unskilled logger while discreetly performing religious ministry.

== Captivity in the Soviet Union ==
Ciszek was arrested in 1941 under false accusations of espionage for Nazi Germany and the Vatican. To his shock, the NKVD (the USSR's secret police) already knew his real name and that he was an American citizen and a Catholic priest. He was then sent to Lubyanka prison in Moscow, the NKVD's national headquarters. He spent five years there, most of them in solitary confinement. In 1942, he signed a confession of espionage under severe torture and was sentenced to 15 years of hard labor in the Gulag.

Ciszek was to remain in Lubyanka for four more years. In 1946, he was sent by train to Krasnoyarsk then 20 days by boat north on the Yenisei River until reaching 300 km above the Arctic Circle at the city of Norilsk, the center of the labor camp complex known as Norillag. There, Ciszek was forced to load coal onto freighter vessels and later transferred to working in coal mines located in the permafrost. A year later, he was sent to work on the construction of a nickel, copper, cobalt, platinum, and palladium ore refinery. From 1953 to 1955, he worked in mines. His memoirs provide a vivid description of the Norilsk uprising, which started at Gorlag spread through Norillag in the aftermath of Joseph Stalin's death.

Throughout his lengthy imprisonment, Ciszek continued to pray, to offer both the Tridentine Mass and the Byzantine Rite Divine Liturgy, to hear confessions, conduct retreats and perform secret and illegal parish ministry. At least one media outlet, The Tablet (Brooklyn), a Brooklyn, NY - based Catholic publication, in 1952 reported him as having died on the way home from Siberia.Until he was allowed to write to the US in 1955, he was presumed dead by both his family and the Society of Jesus.

By April 22, 1955, Ciszek's sentence was complete, and he was released with the restriction to live only in the city of Norilsk. At this time, he was able to write to his sisters in the US. After setting up a Catholic parish in Norilsk, Ciszek was ordered by the KGB in 1958 to move to Krasnoyarsk, where he secretly established several nearby mission parishes. After the KGB learned of this, he was forcibly transferred to Abakan, 160 kilometres (99 mi) to the south, where he worked as an automobile mechanic for four years. In 1963, he received a letter from his sisters in the US. Several months later, the Soviet Union decided to return him (and American student Marvin Makinen) to the US.

After nearly 23 years of imprisonment, Ciszek was released with Makinen on October 12, 1963. In exchange, the Soviets received GRU agents Ivan Dmitrievich Egorov and his wife Alexandra Egorova, whom the FBI had arrested for espionage in July 1963. Ciszek was not aware that two US presidents, Dwight D. Eisenhower and John F. Kennedy, had both been demanding his repatriation since the arrival of his first letter to his sisters in 1955. He remained oblivious until he was flown to Moscow and delivered to a US State Department official, who told him that he was still an American citizen.

== Release and later life ==
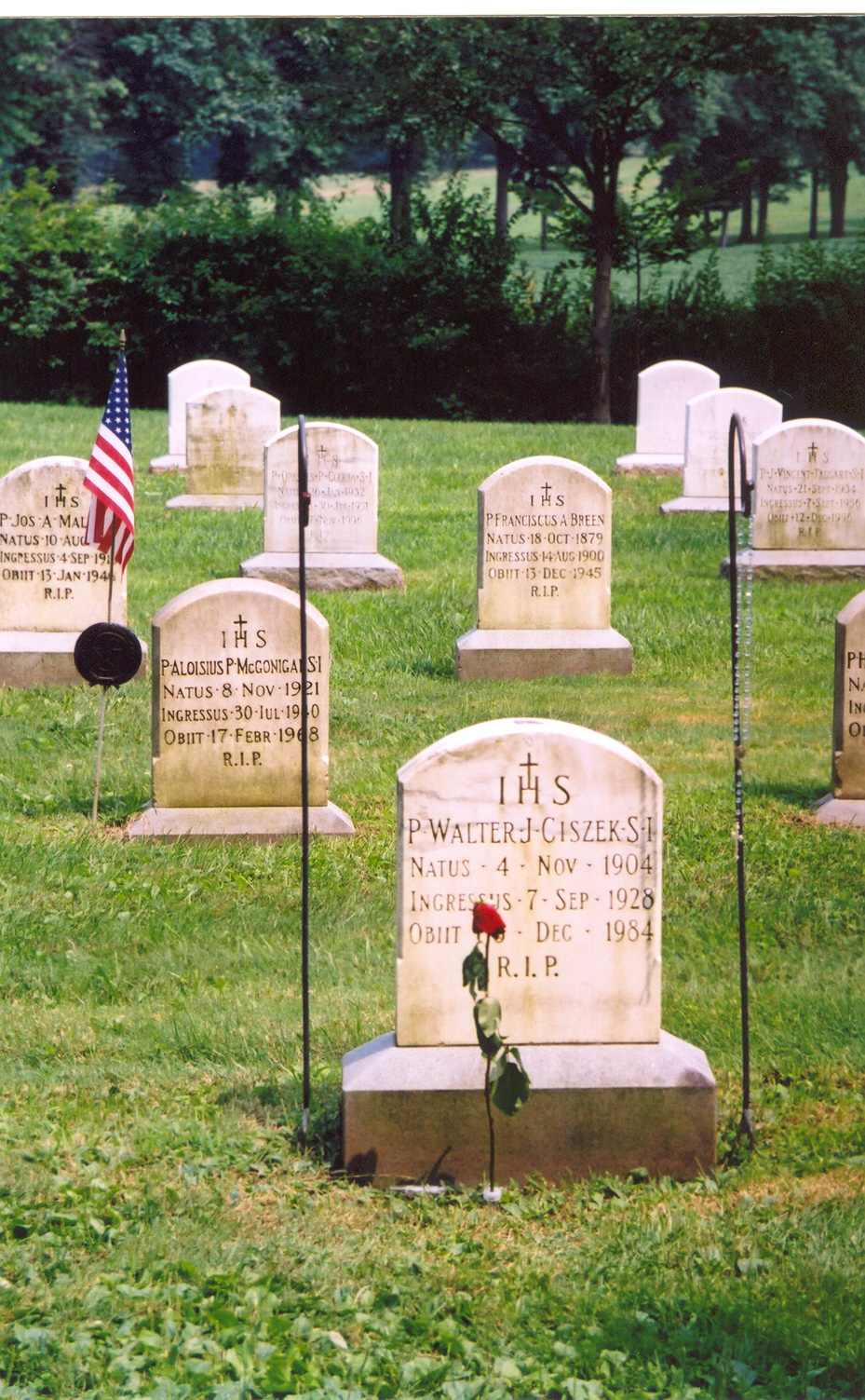
Ciszek's grave at the Jesuit Center in Wernersville, Pennsylvania

In 1965, Ciszek began working and lecturing at the John XXIII Center at Fordham University (now the Center for Eastern Christian Studies at the University of Scranton), counseling and offering spiritual direction to those who visited him.

On December 8, 1984, Ciszek died after many years of declining health and was buried at the Jesuit Cemetery in Wernersville, Pennsylvania.

== Legacy and veneration ==
In 1985, a Carmelite nun, Mother Marija, who was the prioress (hegumena) of a Ruthenian-Rite Carmelite monastery which Ciszek helped found, and which had been under his spiritual direction, began to petition for his formal canonization. In 1990, Michael Dudick, Eparch (bishop) of the Ruthenian Catholic Eparchy of Passaic, New Jersey, opened an official diocesan process of investigation for official recognition on the road to canonization. The cause was formally opened in March 2012, and the investigations were conducted by the Diocese of Allentown. It was officially suspended by the Holy See in 2026.

According to Constantin Simon, S.J., With God in Russia, Ciszek's memoir of his decades in the USSR, went through multiple editions in various languages, including French, German, Spanish, Italian, Dutch, Portuguese, Polish, and Slovak. Although it remains popular among Catholics in North America, the memoir has not gained the same popularity in Europe, where Ciszek has been eclipsed by fellow Russicum graduate and Gulag survivor Pietro Leoni.

Ciszek Hall at Fordham University in New York City is named after him. It currently houses Jesuit scholastics in the first stage of formal study for the priesthood. Additionally, a small room has been set aside in honor of Ciszek. It contains the (Latin) altar, sacred vessels, candlesticks, and crucifix he used, as well as a copy of his final vows and a copy of a letter to a friend containing spiritual advice.

There is also a Ciszek Hall at the University of Scranton. Shenandoah, Pennsylvania also has a school named Trinity Academy at the Father Walter J. Ciszek Education Center. Marquette University's Walter Ciszek Collection is named for him. Additionally, the university has sponsored an annual Ciszek Lecture since 2002.

== Books ==
- With God in Russia, (with Daniel L. Flaherty, S.J.), a memoir (New York: McGraw-Hill, 1964).
- He Leadeth Me, (with Daniel L. Flaherty, S.J.), a memoir (New York: Doubleday, 1973).
- With God in America (published posthumously), a memoir with primary sources (Chicago: Loyola Press, 2016).
