= Robert Robinson (engineer) =

Jamaican-American-Russian (1906–1994)

- Born: June 22, 1906; Jamaica
- Died: February 23, 1994 (aged 87); Washington, D.C., U.S.
- Citizenship: Jamaica; United States; Soviet Union
- Occupations: Mechanical Engineer, toolmaker

Robert Nathaniel Robinson (June 22, 1906 – February 23, 1994) was a Jamaican-born toolmaker who worked in the auto industry in the United States. At the age of 23, he was recruited to work in the Soviet Union. Shortly after his arrival in Stalingrad, Robinson was racially assaulted by two white American workers, both of whom were subsequently arrested, tried and expelled from the Soviet Union with great publicity.

Starting with a one-year contract to work in the Soviet Union, Robinson twice renewed his contract. After the publicity of his assault, he felt unable to return to the US and accepted Soviet citizenship. He earned a degree in mechanical engineering. His repeated attempts to visit outside the USSR finally resulted in an approved trip to Uganda in 1974, where he asked for and was given asylum. He married an African American professor working there. He finally gained re-entry to the United States in 1986, and gained attention for his accounts of his 44 years in the Soviet Union.

== Life ==
Born in Jamaica, Robinson moved with his parents to Cuba, where he grew up. He and his mother were abandoned by his father when he was six. His mother was born in Dominica and had gone to Jamaica while employed by a doctor. He and his mother emigrated to the United States and settled in Detroit. He went to local schools and became a skilled toolmaker at the Ford Motor Company during the expansive years in the auto industry.

In 1929 Ford and the Soviet Union agreed to cooperate on a car plant in Gorky to turn out Model A cars and Model AA light trucks. In 1930, a Russian delegation visited the Company, where Robinson worked as a toolmaker. The delegation leader offered him and others a one-year contract in the Soviet Union. The pay would be far greater. They were promised free rent in a grand apartment, maid service, and a car. At 23, fearing he could be laid off at any moment due to the effects of the Great Depression and the institutionalised racism in the United States, and taking into account that a cousin of a friend had recently been lynched in the South, Robinson accepted.

=== Soviet Union ===
He arrived in Stalingrad on July 4, 1930, to begin working in a tractor factory. The only African American among a contingent of workers from the United States, Robinson was beaten by two white American workers shortly after his arrival. After the incident the Soviet press turned him into a minor celebrity, publicising his case as an example of American racism.

The minute I arrived at 125th street all the desire to be back in America vanished. Everyone looked so listless and discontent [sic], that a pall of gloom descended over and enshrouded me. It was so contrary to the lively spirit manifested by the Russian workers going happily about their daily tasks with no thought of tomorrow's loss of job or eviction. [Robinson quoted during his visit back to the USA in summer of 1933]

After his first year he renewed with another contract. After his second one-year contract expired in June 1932, Robinson went to Moscow to obtain a return ticket to the United States. Officials persuaded him to accept another one-year contract working at a ball-bearing factory. He was one of 362 "foreign specialists" at the plant when he started working there. After the assassination of Sergei Mironovich Kirov, Stalin's assumed successor, on December 1, 1934, the preferred status of foreign specialists ended "overnight".

In 1937, the US government ordered Robinson to return home or relinquish his citizenship. Robinson chose to stay in the Soviet Union due to the continuing Great Depression and accepted Soviet citizenship although he later regretted this decision. He survived Stalin's Great Purge while many of his foreign acquaintances in Moscow vanished in 1936–1939.

Last week that coal-black protege of Joseph Stalin, Robert Robinson, was elected, somewhat to his surprise, to the Moscow Soviet.

— Time magazine. "RUSSIA: Black Blank", Monday, December 24, 1934.

On June 22, 1941, Germany invaded the Soviet Union. Due to the nature of Soviet news reports, Robinson and others at his plant suspected that Soviet forces were suffering devastating losses. The Russians flocked to church that day, surprising Robinson, although after 24 years of Communist rule there were no priests to lead the congregation. Throughout the rest of the war, the government tolerated attendance at religious services.

Robinson survived the German invasion of Russia, during which Hitler's army was stopped only 44 miles (71 km) from Moscow. During the war, he almost died of starvation, with some meals consisting of six or seven cabbage leaves soaked in lukewarm water. Despite the war, the Soviets arranged for continued education. According to his autobiography, Robinson graduated with a degree in mechanical engineering in July 1944, but did not receive his diploma until two years later.

In 1947, he starred as a black American in a film about Nicholas Miklouho-Maclay. He also advised and acted in a Russian film production of the American racial drama Deep Are the Roots (Глубокие корни).

=== Return to the United States ===
After World War II, Robinson attempted to return to the US. He asked the singer and actor Paul Robeson, who had traveled to the Soviet Union, to help him leave the country. Robeson declined to do so as it would harm his relations with the Soviet leadership. Since the 1950s, Robinson had annually applied for a vacation visa abroad and each time, it was denied. Through the influence of two Ugandan ambassadors, Robinson was granted permission to visit Uganda in 1974. He bought a round-trip ticket so as not to arouse suspicion. Once there, he appealed for refuge, which was temporarily granted by Idi Amin. In 1976, Robinson married Zylpha Mapp, an African-American professor who was working at a university in Uganda.

Through the efforts of Ugandan officials, and US Information Service officer William B. Davis, he was eventually allowed to re-enter the United States and re-gained United States citizenship in 1986. He lived in the US until his death in 1994. Following his return, he gave interviews about his insights into Soviet life from the inside, and was also featured in the Detroit Free Press. He was honored by the Ford Motor Company, 60 years after he began his work there. He moved to Washington, D.C., with his wife.

After returning to the United States, Robinson wrote his autobiography, with the writer Jonathan Slevin. It was published as Black on Red: My 44 Years Inside The Soviet Union (1988).

Robinson died of cancer in 1994. Among those attending the funeral were his wife, U.S.I.S. officer Davis, and Mathias Lubega, former Ugandan ambassador to the Soviet Union.

== See also ==
- Alexander Dolgun (1926–1986) survivor of the Soviet Gulag who returned to his native United States.
- Thomas Sgovio (1916–1997) American artist, and former inmate of a Soviet GULAG camp in Kolyma.
- Victor Herman (1915–1985) Jewish-American initially known as the 'Lindbergh of Russia', who then spent 18 years in the Gulags of Siberia.
- George Padmore (1903–1959) Pan-Africanist, journalist, studied in the United States and moved to the Soviet Union.
- William Henry Chamberlin (1897–1969) American journalist during the trial of Robinson's assailants.
- Jack Littlepage (1894–1948) American mining engineer who helped the Soviet gold industry (1929–1937).
- Alexander Pavlovitch Serebrovsky (1884–1938) Soviet revolutionary and petroleum and mining engineer executed during the Great Purge.
