= Victor Herman =

Jewish-American who spent 18 years as a Soviet prisoner

- Photograph of Victor Herman with his Russian family after they arrived in the United States ca. 1977. From left: daughter Svetlana, wife Galina, his Russian mother-in-law, daughter Jaana.
- Born: 1915; Detroit, Michigan, US
- Died: 1985 (aged 69–70)

Victor Herman (September 25, 1915 – March 25, 1985) was a Jewish-American who spent 18 years as a Soviet prisoner in the Gulags of Siberia. At 16 years of age, his family (and about 300 other Ford Motor Company families) went to work in the Soviet Union in the early 1930s but met tragic fates during the Stalin purges.

Herman briefly held the world record in 1934 for the highest parachute jump and became known as the 'Lindbergh of Russia'. He was accused of espionage, arrested and imprisoned in 1938, after repeatedly refusing to declare the Soviet citizenship.

His memoir of his experiences, Coming Out of the Ice (1979), became the basis for a 1982 CBS-TV movie starring John Savage and country singer Willie Nelson.

== Early life ==
Herman was born in Detroit where his father, a Jewish-Ukrainian immigrant, was active in organizing unions at the Ford Motor Company. After Henry Ford made a deal with the Soviets, 300 Ford workers and their families from Detroit moved to Russia to help build a new Ford factory in Gorky. Victor Herman's family was among them, his father holding pro-socialist views.

== Move to Russia ==
In 1931 when Herman was 16, he moved with his family to Russia for a 3-year work shift, while retaining US citizenship. However, in 1934, the Great Purge began and many American expatriates were disappearing, arrested or deported. During these years Herman focused on his prodigious athletic talents and he was eventually noticed and recruited by the Soviet Air Force which taught him how to parachute. He was competitive and strove to be number one. On September 6, 1934, he achieved international notice after he set the World Record for the highest parachute jump, from 24,000 feet. He became known as the 'Lindbergh of Russia'.

== Arrest and imprisonment ==
Soviet authorities asked Herman to sign the World Record documents which included a blank space for citizenship which Herman filled in as "U.S.A." After continually refusing to change it to the U.S.S.R., he was arrested in 1938 for "counter-revolutionary activities" and spent a year in a local prison that included brutal tortures: he had to sit on a bench 18 hours a day unmoving and nonspeaking facing a door, he was beaten in his kidneys every night for 52 days straight, he was thrown into a cell with violent criminals who tried to kill him, and he received almost no food, among other things. Most of his fellow cellmates during this period died from similar deprivations. Herman believed his youth and strength saved him.

Herman was then sentenced to 10 years of hard labor in a Siberian gulag where he suffered extreme hardships including beatings, starvation, torture, and severe freezing temperatures. He survived by various means, such as eating rats which thrived on the frozen corpses which littered the camp. He was briefly released from the Gulag system in 1948, but was required to stay in Siberia as an exile as part of his parole agreement. However, he broke his parole when he married a local Russian woman, Galina, who then had a baby girl, Svetlana. He was re-interned, but this time his wife and child were allowed to live with him under less severe conditions. The death of Stalin in 1953 brought improved conditions for Gulag inmates.

== Release ==
In 1956, Soviet authorities claimed they had no file on Victor Herman, as if he had never been a prisoner, and he was free to leave Siberia but not Russia. Herman spent the next 20 years moving with his family to various locations in the USSR taking odd jobs as a boxing instructor, English-language teacher and farmer on a collective. Through it all he never gave up hope of returning to the United States.

In 1976, after nearly a decade of filing applications with Soviet authorities who refused to recognize his American citizenship, he was allowed to return to the US. Galina, his two daughters and his mother-in-law soon followed him.

Herman's mother died in Russia in the early 1930s, his father died there in the 1950s and his brother Leo died in Russia in 1974 after committing suicide. His sister remained in Russia for the rest of her life, she married a Russian and had a career as a pathologist. In 1978, Herman filed a $10 million lawsuit against Ford Motor Co. for all of the hardships which he had suffered, but the suit was unresolved at the time of his death. The memoir of his experiences, Coming Out of the Ice (1979) was ghostwritten by Gordon Lish. The book later became a TV movie, Coming Out of the Ice, in 1982 starring John Savage, Willie Nelson and Ben Cross.

== See also ==
- Alexander Dolgun (1926-1986) - an American survivor of the Soviet Gulag who returned to the United States.
- John H. Noble (1923-2007) - another American survivor of the Soviet Gulag system, who wrote two books which described his experiences in it after he was permitted to leave the Soviet Union and return to the United States
- Robert Robinson (engineer) (1907-1994) - a Jamaican-born toolmaker who initially worked in the US auto industry in the United States but spent 44 years in the Soviet Union.
- Thomas Sgovio (1916-1997) - an American artist, and a former inmate of a Soviet Gulag camp in Kolyma
- The Forsaken: An American Tragedy in Stalin’s Russia
