= Alexander Dolgun =

American Gulag inmate (1926–1986)

- Born: Alexander Michael Dolgun; 29 September 1926; The Bronx, New York, U.S.
- Died: 28 August 1986 (aged 59); Potomac, Maryland, U.S.
- Known for: Gulag survivor

Alexander Michael Dolgun (29 September 1926 – 28 August 1986) was an American inmate in the Soviet Gulag who wrote about his experiences in 1975 after being allowed to leave the Soviet Union.

== Pre-Gulag years ==
Alexander Dolgun was born on 29 September 1926 in the Bronx, New York, to Michael Dolgun, an immigrant from Poland, and his wife, Annie. In 1933, Michael travelled to the Soviet Union as a short-term technician at Moscow Automotive Works. After a year in Moscow, Michael consented to another one-year tour on the condition that the Soviet Union pay for his family to come over. However, when Michael's second tour of duty was up, he was prevented from leaving by bureaucratic barriers erected by the Soviet authorities and his family was trapped. Alexander Dolgun and his older sister, Stella, grew up in Moscow during the Great Purge of the late 1930s and the Second World War. In 1943, the 16-year-old Alexander took a job at the United States Embassy in Moscow.

== Gulag ==
On 13 December 1948, Dolgun, a U.S. citizen, was working as a file clerk at the Embassy. During his lunch break, he was taken into custody by the Soviet State Security, the MGB. He was interned in the Lubyanka and Lefortovo prisons in Moscow. He was falsely accused of espionage against the Soviet Union and endured a year of sleep and food deprivation, as well as psychological and physical torture designed to prod him into "confessing" to his interrogator, Colonel Sidorov. After enduring this trial, Dolgun was transferred to Sukhanovka, a former monastery converted into a prison.

He survived several months of torture and kept his sanity using tactics such as measuring various distances in his cell as well as distances he covered walking; he estimated that in his time there, the distance he covered walking was enough to take him from Moscow across Europe and halfway across the Atlantic Ocean. His time in Sukhanovka brought him to the brink of death, and he was transferred to the hospital at Butyrka prison to recuperate. His whereabouts were known by Truman, Eisenhower and the U.S. government, but they did nothing for fear of Soviet authorities further harming Dolgun due to fragile U.S.-Soviet relations.

Dolgun was finally given a 25-year sentence in the Gulag. He ended up in Steplag at Dzhezkazgan, Kazakhstan, where he labored for several months until being called back to Moscow. His recall was initiated by colonel Mikhail Ryumin, No. 2 to Viktor Abakumov in the Soviet Union's State Security. Ryumin intended to use Dolgun as a puppet in a show trial. Dolgun was once again sent to Sukhanovka, where Ryumin personally tortured and beat him in an effort to get him to confess to a number of plots and conspiracies against the Soviet Union. For several months, Dolgun endured this torture without fully succumbing but eventually signed several nonsensical confessions. Interest in him declined and he was eventually shipped back to Dzhezkazgan, to a different camp site, located near the village of Krestovaya (Крестовая). In 1952 he was moved to Желдор-поселок (Zheldor-poselok), to a construction site, in 1954 he was moved to a camp site by the settlement of Никольский (Nikolsky, now the city of Satbayev), for construction works. He was interned in Steplag camps until 13 July 1956. On many occasions he managed to find a relatively easy job at camp hospitals. Conditions at Dzhezkazgan gradually improved after Stalin's death in March 1953. Dolgun did not serve at Kengir, but at a camp nearby. He did, however, describe the Kengir uprising in his autobiography from witnesses' accounts.

== After prison ==
After his release from prison in 1956, Dolgun returned to Moscow. Under his release conditions he was not allowed to contact American authorities. Dolgun discovered that both his mother and father had been tortured in an effort to pressure them to implicate him, driving his mother to insanity and she was placed into an asylum, released in 1954. His father was arrested according to Article 58.10 (anti-Soviet propaganda: allegedly, he said that American cars are better than the Soviet ones), sentenced for 10 years, served in Mordovia camps, released in 1955. He took a job translating medical journals into English for the Soviet Health Bureau and befriended several notable Gulag survivors, including Georg Tenno and Aleksandr Solzhenitsyn. Solzhenitsyn included some of Dolgun's experiences in his work The Gulag Archipelago.

Dolgun married Irene in 1965 and they had a son, Andrew, in 1966. His mother died in 1967, and his father in 1968. In 1971, through the efforts of his sister, Stella Krymm, who escaped from the Soviet Union in 1946, and Ambassador John P. Humes, Dolgun managed to get an exit visa and relocated to Rockville, Maryland. Dolgun took a job at the Soviet-American Medicine section of the Fogerty International Center at the National Institutes of Health. In 1975, he published the bestseller Alexander Dolgun's Story: An American in the Gulag, co-written with Patrick Watson, which recounted his Gulag experience in detail.

== Health and death ==
Dolgun's health was severely harmed by his experience and he suffered from numerous ailments. In 1972, he received back pay of US$22,000 ($169,332 in 2025) from the U.S. Embassy for the period of service from 1949 to 1956 and complained that he was paid "peanuts" for his time and should have, at the least, received interest on his salary.

Dolgun died on 28 August 1986, aged 59, in Potomac, Maryland, of kidney failure. He was survived by his wife and son.

== See also ==
- The Forsaken: An American Tragedy in Stalin's Russia
- John H. Noble
- Thomas Sgovio
- Victor Herman

== Bibliography ==
- Dolgun, Alexander, and Watson, Patrick, "Alexander Dolgun's Story: An American in the Gulag."
- "American Tells of his Arrest and 8 years as a Soviet Captive." The New York Times. 28 December 1973.
- "Alexander Dolgun; American was held 8 years in the Gulag." The New York Times. 29 August 1986.
