= Gastev =

Gastev is a Russian surname. Notable people with the surname include:

- Aleksei Gastev (1882–1939), pioneer of scientific management in Russia.
- Yuri Gastev (1928–1993), Mathematician
- John Gastev (born 1964), Australian rules footballer
