= Industrialization in the Soviet Union =

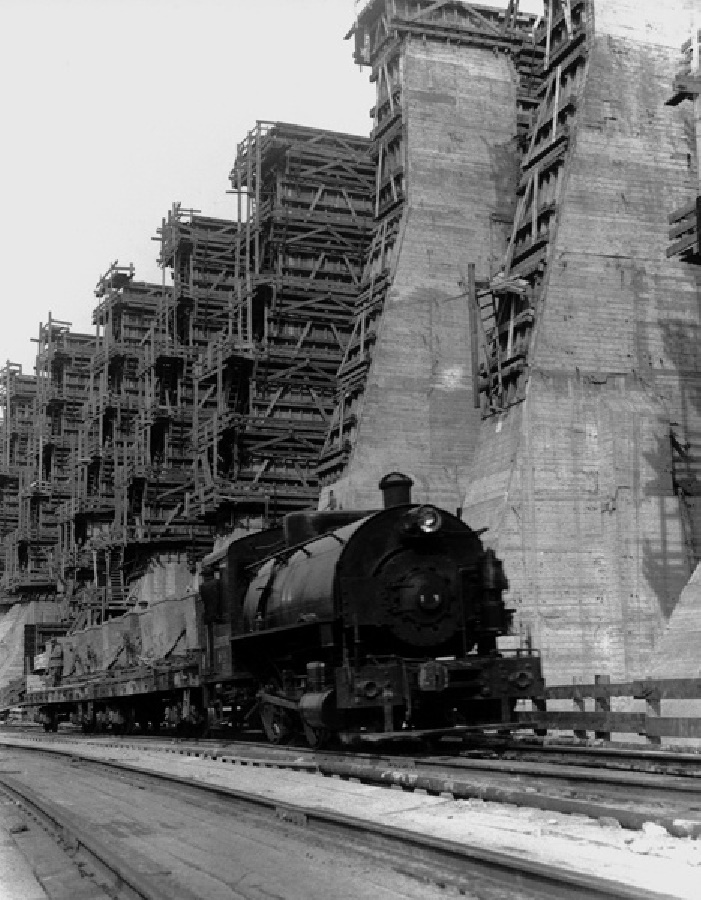
Construction of the Dnieper Hydroelectric Stationwith a steam locomotive in the foreground, 1931

Industrialization in the Soviet Union was the process of the accelerated creation of large–scale machine industry and the transformation of the predominantly agrarian economy of the Soviet Union into an industrial one, carried out from the late 1920s to June 1941 through the system of Five–Year Plans and associated with the construction of a planned economy. In historiography, industrialization is generally distinguished from ordinary economic growth because it involved a deliberate restructuring of production through the transfer of labor, capital, and resources from agriculture to industry, from the countryside to urban centers, and from consumer production to the production of means of production. Most historians regard industrialization as the decisive transformative event in Soviet history, fundamentally reshaping the social structure, economy, and institutions of the Soviet state and creating the industrial, technological, and military foundations that later enabled the Soviet Union to emerge as a global superpower. Industrialization marked the definitive abandonment of the New Economic Policy (NEP) and the transition to a mobilizational model of development in which the state monopolized investment decisions, controlled resource allocation through Gosplan, and prioritized the expansion of heavy industry, machine building, metallurgy, and electrification over consumer welfare.

The origins of industrialization lay in the economic and ideological contradictions that emerged after the October Revolution and the Russian Civil War. Despite the establishment of communist rule, the former Russian Empire remained overwhelmingly rural, economically backward, and technologically dependent on the industrial powers of Western Europe and North America. For the leadership of the All–Union Communist Party (Bolsheviks), this situation represented not only an economic problem but also a theoretical challenge to Marxism, which traditionally assumed that socialism would emerge from a highly developed capitalist economy rather than from a predominantly peasant society. Throughout the 1920s, Soviet leaders debated whether industrial development should proceed gradually within the framework of the NEP or through accelerated state-directed accumulation. These disputes became known as the Soviet industrialization debate and involved figures such as Leon Trotsky, Yevgeni Preobrazhensky, Nikolai Bukharin, Alexei Rykov, and Mikhail Tomsky, whose competing proposals reflected broader disagreements over the future of the Soviet economy and the relationship between the state, the working class, and the peasantry.

The political victory of the supporters of accelerated industrial development was consolidated during the Great Break of 1929, which coincided with the rise of Joseph Stalin as the dominant figure in Soviet politics and the defeat of both the Left Opposition and the Right Opposition. Drawing ideological justification from the doctrine of socialism in one country, Stalin and his supporters argued that the Soviet Union had to overcome decades of economic backwardness within a single generation or risk military defeat and political subordination to the capitalist world. The industrialization program was therefore conceived not merely as an economic strategy but as a project of state-building, national security, and socialist transformation. The implementation of this program required the abandonment of market mechanisms associated with the NEP, the expansion of the authority of Gosplan, the growing role of the Supreme Soviet of the National Economy, and the prioritization of Group A industries – the production of capital goods – over Group B industries, which produced consumer goods.

The practical implementation of industrialization relied on centralized directive planning, mass resource mobilization, and the extraction of capital from the agricultural sector through the collectivization of agriculture. During the first five-year plan and second five-year plan, the Soviet government sponsored the construction of major industrial enterprises and infrastructure projects, including the Magnitogorsk Iron and Steel Works, the Dnieper Hydroelectric Station, Uralmash, the Stalingrad Tractor Plant, the Chelyabinsk Tractor Plant, the Kuznetsk Basin industrial complex, and the Turkestan–Siberia Railway. Many of these projects were built with imported machinery and the assistance of foreign specialists from companies such as Ford Motor Company, General Electric, and Albert Kahn Associates. Labor mobilization combined ideological campaigns such as the Stakhanovite movement, socialist competition, and the promotion of shock workers with coercive methods, including extensive reliance on the forced labor of prisoners within the Gulag system.

Despite its proclaimed goal of building socialism, industrialization generated profound theoretical, political, and social tensions within the Soviet system itself. The drive for rapid accumulation contributed to dekulakization, mass population displacement, and the Soviet famine of 1930–1933, events that remain among the most controversial aspects of Soviet history. At the same time, the expansion of centralized planning strengthened the bureaucracy, increased the authority of party and state institutions, and transformed the Communist Party of the Soviet Union from a revolutionary movement into a highly centralized administrative apparatus. In the long term, industrialization created the heavy-industrial and military–industrial complex that made possible Soviet victory in the Great Patriotic War, postwar reconstruction, and the emergence of the Soviet Union as one of the two dominant powers of the Cold War. Its human cost, economic efficiency, and historical legacy remain subjects of extensive historiographical debate, but scholars generally agree that industrialization permanently established the foundations of the Soviet command economy, shaped both the strengths and structural weaknesses of the Soviet system, and determined the trajectory of Soviet development until the dissolution of the Soviet Union in 1991.

== GOELRO ==
Already during the Civil War, the Soviet government began to develop a long-term plan for the electrification of the country. In December 1920, the GOELRO plan was approved by the 8th All-Russian Congress of Soviets, and a year later it was approved by the 9th All-Russian Congress of Soviets.

The plan provided for the priority development of the electric power industry, tied to the plans for the development of territories. The GOELRO plan, designed for 10–15 years, provided for the construction of 30 district power plants (20 thermal power plants and 10 hydroelectric power plants) with a total capacity of 1.75 gigawatts. The project covered eight major economic regions (Northern, Central Industrial, Southern, Volga, Ural, West Siberian, Caucasian and Turkestan). At the same time, the development of the country's transport system was carried out (reconstruction of old and construction of new railway lines, construction of the Volga–Don Canal).

The GOELRO project made possible the industrialization in the Soviet Union: electricity generation in 1932 compared with 1913 increased almost 7 times, from 2 to 13.5 billion kWh.

== Features of industrialization ==
Researchers highlight the following features of industrialization:

- As the main link were selected investment sectors: metallurgy, engineering, industrial construction;
- Pumping funds from agriculture to industry using price scissors;
- The special role of the state in the centralization of funds for industrialization;
- The creation of a single form of ownership – socialist – in two forms: state and cooperative–collective farm;
- Industrialization planning;
- Lack of private capital (cooperative entrepreneurship in that period was legal);
- Relying on own resources (it was impossible to attract private capital in the existing external and internal conditions);
- Over-centralized resources.

== Discussions in the period of the New Economic Policy ==
Until 1928, the Soviet Union conducted the New Economic Policy. While agriculture, retail, services, food and light industries were mostly in private hands, the state retained control of heavy industry, transport, banks, wholesale and international trade (deemed the commanding heights of the economy). State-owned enterprises competed with each other, the role of the Gosplan of the Soviet Union was limited to forecasts that determined the direction and size of public investment.

One of the fundamental contradictions of Bolshevism was the fact that the party that called itself "workers" and its rule the "dictatorship of the proletariat" came to power in an agrarian country where factory workers constituted only a few percent of the population, and most of them were recent immigrants from the village who have not yet completely broken ties with her. Forced industrialization was designed to eliminate this contradiction.

From a foreign policy point of view, the country was in hostile conditions. According to the leadership of the All-Union Communist Party (Bolsheviks), there was a high probability of a new war with capitalist states. It is significant that even at the 10th congress of the Russian Communist Party (Bolsheviks) in 1921, Lev Kamenev, the author of the report "About the Soviet Republic Surrounded", stated that preparations for the Second World War, which had begun in Europe:

What we see every day in Europe ...testifies that the war is not over, armies move, combat orders are given, garrisons are sent to one or the other area, no borders can be considered firmly established. ...one can expect from hour to hour that the old finished imperialist slaughter will generate, as its natural continuation, some new, even more monstrous, even more disastrous imperialist war.

Preparation for war required a thorough rearmament. The military schools of the Russian Empire, destroyed by the revolution and the civil war, were rebuilt: military academies, schools, institutes and military courses began training for the Red Army. However, it was impossible to immediately begin technical re-equipment of the Red Army due to the backwardness of heavy industry. At the same time, the existing rates of industrialization seemed insufficient, as the lag behind the capitalist countries, which had an economic upswing in the 1920s, was increasing.

One of the first such plans for rearmament was laid out as early as 1921, in the draft reorganization of the Red Army prepared for the 10th congress by Sergey Gusev and Mikhail Frunze. The draft stated both the inevitability of a new big war and the unpreparedness of the Red Army for it. Gusev and Frunze suggested organizing mass production of tanks, artillery, "armored cars, armored trains, airplanes" in a "shock" order. A separate point was also suggested to carefully study the combat experience of the Civil War, including the units that opposed the Red Army (officer units of the White Guards, Makhnovists carts, Wrangel "bombing airplanes", etc.). In addition, the authors also urged to urgently organize the publication in Russia of foreign "Marxist" works on military issues.

After the end of the Civil War, Russia again faced the pre-revolutionary problem of agrarian overpopulation (the "Malthusian-Marxist trap"). In the reign of Nicholas II, overpopulation caused a gradual decrease in the average allotments of land, the surplus of workers in the village was not absorbed by the outflow to the cities (amounting to about 300,000 people per year, with an average increase of up to 1 million people per year), nor by emigration Stolypin government program of resettling colonists in the Urals. In the 1920s, overpopulation took the form of urban unemployment. It has become a serious social problem that has grown throughout the New Economic Policy, and by the end of it was more than 2 million people, or about 10% of the urban population. The government believed that one of the factors hindering the development of industry in the cities was the lack of food and the unwillingness of the village to provide the city with bread at low prices.

The party leadership intended to solve these problems by the planned redistribution of resources between agriculture and industry, in accordance with the concept of socialism, which was announced at the 14th Congress of the All-Union Communist Party (Bolsheviks) and the 3rd All-Union Congress of Soviets in 1925. In the Stalinist historiography, the 14th congress was called the "industrialization congress", but it made only a general decision about the need to transform the Soviet Union from an agrarian country into an industrial one, without determining the specific forms and rates of industrialization.

The choice of a specific implementation of central planning was vigorously discussed in 1926–1928. Proponents of the genetic approach (Vladimir Bazarov, Vladimir Groman, Nikolai Kondratiev) believed that the plan should be based on objective regularities of economic development, identified as a result of an analysis of existing trends. Proponents of the teleological approach (Gleb Krzhizhanovsky, Valerian Kuybyshev, Stanislav Strumilin) believed that the plan should transform the economy and proceed from future structural changes, production opportunities and rigid discipline. Among the party functionaries, the former were supported by a supporter of the evolutionary path to socialism, Nikolai Bukharin, and the latter by Leon Trotsky, who insisted on an accelerated pace of industrialization.

Trotsky had delivered a joint report to the April Plenum of the Central Committee in 1926 which proposed a program for national industrialization and the replacement of annual plans with five-year plans. His proposals were rejected by the Central Committee majority which was controlled by the troika and derided by Stalin at the time. Trotsky as president of the electrification commission and the Opposition bloc also put forward an electrification plan which involved the construction of the hydroelectric Dnieprostroi dam.

One of the first ideologues of industrialization was Evgeny Preobrazhensky, an economist close to Trotsky, who in 1924–25 developed the concept of forced "superindustrialization" at the expense of funds from the countryside ("initial socialist accumulation", according to Preobrazhensky). For his part, Bukharin accused Preobrazhensky and his "left opposition" who supported him in imposing "feudal military exploitation of the peasantry" and "internal colonialism".

The general secretary of the Central Committee of the All-Union Communist Party (Bolsheviks), Joseph Stalin, initially supported Bukharin's point of view, but after Trotsky's exclusion from the Party's Central Committee in late 1927, he changed his position to the opposite. This led to a decisive victory for the teleological school and a radical turn from the New Economic Policy. Researcher Vadim Rogovin believes that the cause of Stalin's "left turn" was the grain harvest crisis of 1927; the peasantry, especially the well-to-do, massively refused to sell the bread, considering the purchase prices set by the state to be low.

The internal economic crisis of 1927 intertwined with a sharp exacerbation of the foreign policy situation. On February 23, 1927, the British Foreign Secretary sent a note to the Soviet Union demanding that it stop supporting the Kuomintang–Communist government in China. After the refusal, the United Kingdom on May 24–27 broke off diplomatic relations with the Soviet Union. However, at the same time, the alliance of the Kuomintang and the Chinese Communists fell apart; on April 12, Chiang Kai-shek and his allies massacred the Shanghai Communists. This incident was widely used by the "united opposition" (the "Trotsky-Zinoviev bloc") to criticize the official Stalinist diplomacy as deliberately a failure.

In the same period, a raid on the Soviet embassy in Beijing (April 6) took place; British police searched the Soviet-British joint-stock company Arcos in London (May 12). In June 1927, representatives of the Russian All-Military Union conducted a series of terrorist attacks against the Soviet Union. In particular, on June 7, White émigré Koverda killed the Soviet Plenipotentiary in Warsaw, Voykov, on the same day in Minsk, the head of the Belarusian Joint State Political Directorate, Iosif Opansky, was killed, the day before, the Russian All-Military Union terrorist threw a bomb at the Joint State Political Directorate in Moscow. All these incidents contributed to the creation of a "military psychosis" environment, the emergence of expectations of a new foreign intervention ("crusade against Bolshevism").

By January 1928, only two-thirds of the grain was harvested compared to last year's level, as the peasants massively held the bread, considering the purchase prices to be low. The disruptions in the supply of cities and the army that had begun were aggravated by the exacerbation of the foreign policy situation, which even reached the point of trial mobilisation. In August 1927, a panic began among the population, which resulted in the wholesale purchase of food for the future. At the 15th Congress of the All-Union Communist Party (Bolsheviks) (December 1927), Mikoyan admitted that the country had experienced the difficulties of "the eve of war without having a war".

== First five-year plan ==
The main task of the introduced command economy was to build up the economic and military power of the state at the highest possible rates, accompanied with the near complete elimination of private industry that had allowed under the NEP. At the initial stage, it was reduced to the redistribution of the maximum possible amount of resources for the needs of state-owned industrialisation. In December 1927, at the 15th Congress of the All-Union Communist Party (Bolsheviks), "Directives for drafting the first five-year national economic development plan of the Soviet Union" were adopted, in which the congress spoke out against super-industrialization: the growth rates should not be maximal and should be planned so that failures do not occur. Developed on the basis of directives, the draft of the first five-year plan (October 1, 1928 – October 1, 1933) was approved at the 16th Conference of the All-Union Communist Party (Bolsheviks) (April 1929) as a complex of carefully thought-out and real tasks. This plan, in reality, is much more stressful than previous projects, immediately after it was approved by the 5th Congress of Soviets of the Soviet Union in May 1929, gave grounds for the state to carry out a number of economic, political, organizational and ideological measures, which elevated industrialization in status of the concept, the era of the "Great Turn". The country had to expand the construction of new industries, increase the production of all types of products and start producing new equipment.

We are 50–100 years behind the advanced countries. We must make good this distance in ten years. Either we do it, or they crush us.

— Joseph Stalin

According to historian Sheila Fitzpatrick, the scholarly consensus was that Stalin appropriated the position of the Left Opposition on such matters as industrialisation and collectivisation.

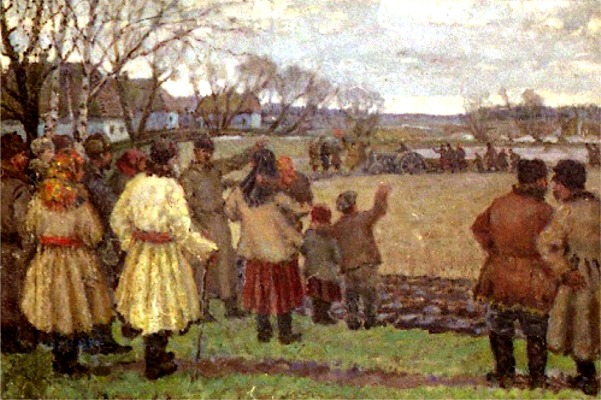
Vladimir Krihatsky. "First Tractor"

First of all, using propaganda, the party leadership mobilized the population in support of industrialization. Komsomol members, in particular, took it with enthusiasm. There was no shortage of cheap labor, because after collectivization, a large number of yesterday's rural inhabitants moved from rural areas to cities from poverty, hunger and the arbitrariness of the authorities. Millions of people selflessly, almost by hand, built hundreds of factories, power stations, laid railways, subways. Often had to work in three shifts. In 1930, around 1,500 facilities were launched, of which 50 absorbed almost half of all investments. With the assistance of foreign specialists, a number of giant industrial buildings were erected: DneproGES, metallurgical plants in Magnitogorsk, Lipetsk and Chelyabinsk, Novokuznetsk, Norilsk and Uralmash, tractor plants in Stalingrad, Chelyabinsk, Kharkov, Uralvagonzavod, GAZ, ZIS (modern ZiL) and others. In 1935, the first line of the Moscow Metro opened with a total length of 11.2 km (7 mi).

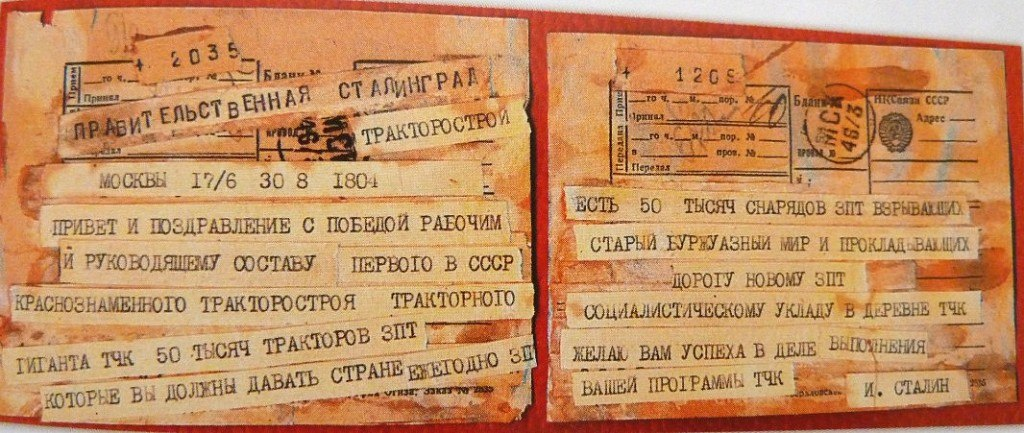
Congratulations by Stalin on the opening of the Stalingrad Tractor Plant

Attention was paid to the destruction of private agriculture and its replacement by state-run large farms. Due to the emergence of domestic tractor construction, in 1932, the Soviet Union refused to import tractors from abroad, and in 1934, the Kirov Plant in Leningrad began to produce a tilled tractor "Universal", which became the first domestic tractor exported abroad. In the ten years before the war, about 700,000 tractors were produced, which accounted for 40% of their world production.

In order to create its own engineering base, the domestic system of higher technical education was urgently created. In 1930, universal primary education was introduced in the Soviet Union, and seven-year compulsory education in the cities.

In 1930, speaking at the 16th Congress of the All-Union Communist Party (Bolsheviks), Stalin admitted that an industrial breakthrough was possible only when building "socialism in one country" and demanded a multiple increase in the tasks of the five-year plan, arguing be exceeded.

In order to increase incentives to work, payment has become more tightly attached to performance. Actively developed centers for the development and implementation of the principles of the scientific organisation of labor. One of the largest centres of this kind, the Central Institute of Labour, created about 1,700 training points with 2,000 of the most qualified instructors of the Central Labor Institute in different parts of the country. They operated in all leading sectors of the national economy—in engineering, metallurgy, construction, light and timber industries, on railways and motor vehicles, in agriculture and even in the navy.

In 1933, at the joint plenum of the Central Committee and the Central Control Commission of the All-Union Communist Party (Bolsheviks), Stalin said in his report that according to the results of the first five-year plan, consumer goods produced less than needed, but the policy of moving industrialization to the background would have meant that "we would not have a tractor and automobile industry, ferrous metallurgy, metal for the production of machines. The country would sit without bread. Capitalist elements in the country would incredibly increase the chances for the restoration of capitalism. Our position would become similar to that of China, which at that time did not have its own heavy and military industry, and became the object of aggression. We would not have non-aggression pacts with other countries, but military intervention and war. A dangerous and deadly war, a bloody and unequal war, for in this war we would be almost unarmed before the enemies, having at our disposal all modern means of attack."

Since capital investments in heavy industry almost immediately exceeded the previously planned amount and continued to grow, money emission was sharply increased (that is, printing of paper money), and during the entire first five-year period money supply growth in circulation more than doubled than production of consumer goods, which led to higher prices and a shortage of consumer goods.

In 1935, the "Stakhanovist movement" appeared, in honor of the mine worker Alexey Stakhanov, who, according to official information of that time, performed 14.5 norms for a shift on the night of August 30, 1935.

Since after the nationalization of foreign concessions for gold mining against the Soviet Union, a "golden boycott" was declared, such methods as selling paintings from the Hermitage collection were used to obtain the foreign currency needed to finance industrialization.

At the same time, the state shifted to the centralized distribution of the means of production and consumer goods belonging to it, the introduction of command-administrative methods of management and the nationalization of private property were carried out. A political system emerged based on the leading role of the All-Union Communist Party (Bolsheviks), state ownership of the means of production and a minimum of private initiative. Also began the widespread use of forced labor by prisoners of the Gulag, special settlers and rear militia.

The first five-year plan was associated with rapid urbanization. The urban labour force increased by 12.5 million people, of whom 8.5 million were migrants from rural areas. However, the Soviet Union reached a share in 50% of the urban population only in the early 1960s.

== Foreign influences and specialists ==
The Bolsheviks' view of industrialization was influenced in part by their view of the World War I mobilization efforts and wartime economies of Western Europe. In an effort to catch-up, the Soviet Union imported technology from leading industrial powers, particularly the United States and Germany. During the first Five Year Plan period, the Soviet Union sought Western advisors to assist in Soviet factories.

Ford Motors participated in the development of an automobile production complex in Nizhny Novgorod, which drew influence from Ford River Rouge complex in Detroit.

In February 1930, between Amtorg and Albert Kahn, Inc., a firm of American architect Albert Kahn, an agreement was signed, according to which Kahn's firm became the chief consultant of the Soviet government on industrial construction and received a package of orders for the construction of industrial enterprises worth $2 billion (about $250 billion in prices of our time). The company provided construction of more than 500 industrial facilities in the Soviet Union.

American hydrobuilder Hugh Cooper became the chief consultant for the construction of the DneproGES, hydro turbines for which were purchased from General Electric and Newport News Shipbuilding.

The Magnitogorsk Metallurgical Plant was designed by the American firm Arthur G. McKee and Co., which also supervised its construction. A standard blast furnace for this and all other steel mills of the industrialization period was developed by the Chicago-based Freyn Engineering Co.

== Results ==
The growth of the physical volume of the gross industrial output of the Soviet Union in the years of the 1st and 2nd five-year plans (1928–1937)
Products	1928	1932	1937	1928 to 1932 (%) 1st Five-Year Plan	1928 to 1937 (%) 1st and 2nd Five-Year Plans
Cast iron, million tons	3.3	6.2	14.5	188	439
Steel, million tons	4.3	5.9	17.7	137	412
Rolled ferrous metals, million tons	3.4	4.4	13	129	382
Coal, million tons	35.5	64.4	128	181	361
Oil, million tons	11.6	21.4	28.5	184	246
Electricity, billion kWh	5.0	13.5	36.2	270	724
Paper, thousand tons	284	471	832	166	293
Cement, million tons	1.8	3.5	5.5	194	306
Sugar, thousand tons	1,283	1,828	2,421	142	189
Metal-cutting machines, thousand pieces	2.0	19.7	48.5	985	2,425
Cars, thousand pieces	0.8	23.9	200	2,988	25,000
Leather shoes, million pairs	58.0	86.9	183	150	316

At the end of 1932, the successful and early implementation of the first five-year plan for four years and three months was announced. Summarizing its results, Stalin announced that heavy industry had fulfilled the plan by 108%. During the period between October 1, 1928, and January 1, 1933, the production fixed assets of heavy industry increased by 2.7 times.

In report at the 17th Congress of the All-Union Communist Party (Bolsheviks) in January 1934, Stalin cited the following figures with the words: "This means that our country has become firmly and finally an industrial country".

The share of industry in gross output of the national economy as a percentage (according to the report of Joseph Stalin)
	1913	1929	1930	1931	1932	1933 (%)
Industry (without small)	42.1	54.5	61.6	66.7	70.7	70.4
Agriculture	57.9	45.5	38.4	33.3	29.3	29.6

Following the first five-year plan, the second five-year plan followed, with a somewhat lower emphasis on industrialisation, and then the third five-year plan, which was thwarted by the outbreak of World War II.

The result of the first five-year plans was the development of heavy industry, thanks to which the increase in gross domestic product during 1928–40, according to Vitaly Melyantsev, was about 4.6% per year (according to other, earlier estimates, from 3% to 6.3%). Industrial production in the period 1928–1937 increased 2.5–3.5 times, that is, 10.5–16% per year. In particular, the release of machinery in the period 1928–1937 grew on average 27.4% per year. From 1930 to 1940, the number of higher and secondary technical educational institutions in the Soviet Union increased 4 times and exceeded 150.

By 1941, about 9,000 new plants were built. By the end of the second five-year plan, the Soviet Union took the second place in the world in industrial output, second only to the United States. Imports fell sharply, which was viewed as the country's gaining economic independence. Open unemployment had been eliminated. Employment (at full rates) increased from one third of the population in 1928 to 45% in 1940, which provided about half of the growth of the gross national product. For the period 1928–1937 universities and colleges prepared about two million specialists. Many new technologies were mastered. Thus, it was only during the first five-year period that the production of synthetic rubber, motorcycles, watches, cameras, excavators, high-quality cement and high-quality steel grades was adjusted. The foundation was also laid for Soviet science, which in certain areas eventually became world-leading. On the basis of the established industrial base, it became possible to conduct a large-scale re-equipment of the army; during the first five-year plan, defense spending rose to 10.8% of the budget.

With the onset of industrialization, the consumption fund, and as a result, the standard of living of the population, has sharply decreased. By the end of 1929, the rationing system was extended to almost all food products, but the shortage of rations was still there, and there were long queues to buy them. In the future, the standard of living began to improve. In 1936, the cards were canceled, which was accompanied by an increase in wages in the industrial sector and an even greater increase in state rations prices for all goods. The average level of per capita consumption in 1938 was 22% higher than in 1928. However, the greatest growth was among the party and labor elite and did not at all touch the overwhelming majority of the rural population, or more than half of the country's population.

The growth of the physical volume of the gross industrial output of the Soviet Union for the years 1913–1940
Products	1913	1940	1940 to 1913 (%)
Electricity production, billion kWh	2.0	48.3	2,400
Steel, million tons	4.2	18.3	435

The end date of industrialization is determined by different historians in different ways. From the point of view of the conceptual aspiration to raise heavy industry in record time, the first five-year plan was the most pronounced period. Most often, the end of industrialization is understood as the last pre-war year (1940), less often the year before Stalin's death (1952). If industrialization is understood as a process whose goal is the share of industry in the gross domestic product, characteristic of industrialized countries, then the economy of the Soviet Union reached such a state only in the 1960s. One should also take into account the social aspect of industrialization, since it was only in the early 1960s urban population exceeded rural.

Soviet economist and secretary of the party committee of the Leningrad University Nikolai Kolesov Dmitrievich believes that without the implementation of the industrialization policy, the political and economic independence of the country would not have been ensured. Sources of funds for industrialization and its pace were predetermined by economic backwardness and too short a period allowed for its liquidation. According to Kolesov, the Soviet Union managed to eliminate the backwardness in just 13 years.

=== Influences elsewhere ===
The speed of the Soviet Union's catch-up industrialization was an influence on Japanese policymakers' view of industrialization. Economic planning in the Japanese puppet state of Manchukuo was influenced by Japanese observations of the Soviet approach and reflected in Manchukuo's Five Year Plan for Heavy Industry. The development of industry in Manchukuo further influenced Japanese economic mobilization following the start of the Second Sino-Japanese War.

== Criticism ==
During the years of Soviet power, the Communists argued that the basis of industrialization was a rational and achievable plan. Meanwhile, it was supposed that the first five-year plan would come into effect at the end of 1928, but even by the time of its announcement in April–May 1929, the work on its compilation was not completed. The initial form of the plan included goals for 50 industries and agriculture, as well as the relationship between resources and opportunities. Over time, the achievement of predetermined indicators began to play a major role. If the growth rates of industrial production originally set in terms of were 18–20%, by the end of the year they were doubled. Western and Russian researchers argue that despite the report on the successful implementation of the first five-year plan, the statistics were falsified, and none of the goals were achieved even closely. Moreover, in agriculture and in industries dependent on agriculture, there was a sharp decline. Part of the party nomenclature was extremely outraged by this, for example, Sergey Syrtsov described the reports on the achievements as "fraud".

On the contrary, according to Boris Brutskus, it was poorly thought out, which manifested itself in a series of announced "fractures" (April–May 1929, January–February 1930, June 1931). A grandiose and thoroughly politicised system emerged, the characteristic features of which were economic "gigantomania", chronic commodity hunger, organizational problems, wastefulness, and loss-making enterprises. The goal (that is, the plan) began to determine the means for its implementation. According to the findings of other historians (Robert Conquest, Richard Pipes, etc.), the neglect of material support and the development of infrastructure over time began to cause significant economic damage. Some of the industrialization endeavors are considered by critics to have been poorly thought out from the start. Jacques Rossi argues that the White Sea–Baltic Canal was unnecessary. At the same time, according to Soviet statistics, already in 1933, 1.143 million tons of cargo and 27,000 passengers were transported along the canal; in 1940, about one million tons, and in 1985, 7.3 million tons of cargo. However, the incredibly brutal conditions in the building of the canal resulted in the death of up to 25,000 able-bodied working-age Soviet citizens. This not only deprived the Soviet Union of their labor but reduced the pool of manpower for military service to counter Nazi German aggression only eight years later.

Despite the development of output, industrialization was carried out mainly by extensive methods: economic growth was ensured by an increase in the gross capital formation rate in fixed capital, a savings rate (due to a fall in the consumption rate), employment rates and the exploitation of natural resources. British scientist Don Filzer believes that this was due to the fact that as a result of collectivisation and a sharp decline in the standard of living of the rural population, human labor was greatly devalued. Vadim Rogovin notes that the desire to fulfill the plan led to a situation of overstretching forces and a permanent search for reasons to justify the non-fulfillment of excessive tasks. Because of this, industrialization could not feed solely on enthusiasm and demanded a series of compulsory measures. Since October 1930, the free movement of labor was prohibited and criminal penalties were imposed for violations of labor discipline and negligence. Since 1931, workers had become responsible for damage to equipment. In 1932 the forced transfer of labor between enterprises became possible and the death penalty was introduced for the theft of state property. On December 27, 1932, an internal passport was restored, which Lenin at one time condemned as "czarist backwardness and despotism". The seven-day week was replaced by a full working week, the days of which, without names, were numbered from 1 to 5. On every sixth day, there was a day off for work shifts, so that factories could work without interruption. Prisoners' labor was actively used (see Gulag). In fact, during the first five-year plan the communists laid the foundations of forced labor for the Soviet population. All this became the subject of sharp criticism in democratic countries, and not only by the liberals, but also by the social democrats.

Workers' discontent from time to time turned into strikes: at the Stalin plant, the Voroshilov plant, the Shosten plant in Ukraine, at the Krasnoye Sormovo plant near Nizhny Novgorod, at the Serp and Molot plant of Mashinootrest in Moscow, at the Chelyabinsk Traktorstroy and other enterprises.

Industrialization also entailed the collectivisation of agriculture. First of all, agriculture had become a source of primary accumulation, due to low purchase prices for grain and subsequent export at higher prices, as well as due to the so-called "super tax in the form of overpayments for manufactured goods". In the future, the peasantry also ensured the growth of heavy industry by labor. The short-term result of this collectivization policy was a temporary drop in agricultural production. The consequence of this was the deterioration of the economic situation of the peasantry, famine in the Soviet Union of 1932–33. To compensate for the losses of the village required additional costs. In 1932–1936, the collective farms received about 500,000 tractors from the state, not only for mechanizing the cultivation of the land, but also to compensate for the damage from the reduction in the number of horses by 51% (77 million) in 1929–1933. The mechanization of labour in agriculture and the unification of separate land plots ensured a significant increase in labor productivity.

Trotsky and foreign critics argued that, despite efforts to increase labor productivity, in practice, average labour productivity fell. This is stated in a number of modern publications, according to which for the period 1929–1932 value added per hour of work in industry fell by 60% and returned to the level of 1929 only in 1952. This is explained by the emergence in the economy of chronic commodity shortages, collectivization, mass hunger, a massive influx of untrained workforce from the countryside and an increase in their labor resources by enterprises. At the same time, the specific gross national product per worker in the first 10 years of industrialization grew by 30%.

Trotsky also maintained that the disproportions and imbalances which became characteristic of Stalinist planning in the 1930s such as the underdeveloped consumer base along with the priority focus on heavy industry were due to a number of avoidable problems. He argued that the industrial drive had been enacted under more severe circumstances, several years later and in a less rational manner than proposal originally conceived by the Left Opposition. Comparatively, Trotsky believed that planning and N.E.P should develop within a mixed framework until the socialist sector gradually superseded the private industry.

As for the records of the Stakhanovists, a number of historians note that their methods were a continuous method of increasing productivity, previously popularized by Frederick Taylor and Henry Ford, which Lenin called the "sweatshop system". In addition, records were largely staged and were the result of the efforts of their assistants, and in practice turned the pursuit of quantity at the expense of product quality. Due to the fact that wages were proportional to productivity, the wages of Stakhanovists were several times higher than the average wages in industry. This caused a hostile attitude towards the Stakhanovists from the "backward" workers, who reproached them with the fact that their records lead to higher standards and lower prices. Newspapers talked about the "unprecedented and blatant sabotage" of the Stakhanov movement by masters, shop managers, trade union organizations.

The exclusion of Trotsky, Kamenev and Zinoviev from the party at the 15th Congress of the All-Union Communist Party (Bolsheviks) gave rise to a wave of repressions in the party that spread to the technical intelligentsia and foreign technical specialists. At the July plenum of the Central Committee of the All-Union Communist Party (Bolsheviks) of 1928, Stalin advanced the thesis that "as we move forward, the resistance of the capitalist elements will increase, the class struggle will escalate". In the same year, the campaign against sabotage began. The "pests" were blamed for failing to achieve the targets of the plan. The first high-profile trial of the "pest" case was the Shakhty Trial, after which charges of sabotage could follow the company's failure to comply with the plan.

One of the main goals of forced industrialization was to overcome the backlog from the developed capitalist countries. Some critics argue that this lag was in itself primarily a consequence of the October Revolution. They draw attention to the fact that in 1913 Russia ranked fifth in world industrial production and was the world leader in industrial growth with an indicator of 6.1% per year for the period 1888–1913. However, by 1920, the level of production fell ninefold compared with 1916.

Soviet propaganda claimed that economic growth was unprecedented. On the other hand, in a number of modern studies, it is proved that the growth rate of gross domestic product in the Soviet Union (the above-mentioned 3–6.3%) were comparable with the similar figures in Germany in 1930–38 (4.4%) and Japan (6.3%), although they were significantly superior to those of countries such as United Kingdom, France and the United States that were experiencing the Great Depression at that time. However, this was largely due to the Soviet Union's much larger population and workforce. When measured on a per capita basis, Soviet industrial output and productivity were actually much lower than Germany's.

For the Soviet Union of that period, authoritarianism and central planning in the economy were characteristic. At first glance, this gives weight to the popular belief that the high rates of increasing industrial output of the Soviet Union were obliged to the authoritarian regime and planned economy. However, a number of economists believe that the growth of the Soviet economy was achieved only due to its extensive nature. As part of counterfactual historical studies, or so-called "virtual scenarios", it was suggested that, if the New Economic Policy were preserved, industrialization and rapid economic growth would also be possible.

During the years of industrialization in the Soviet Union there was an average population growth of 1% per year, while in England it was 0.36%, the USA was 0.6%, and in France it was 0.11%.

== Industrialization and the Great Patriotic War ==
One of the main goals of industrialization was building up the military potential of the Soviet Union. So, if as of January 1, 1932, there were 1,446 tanks and 213 armored vehicles in the Red Army, then as of January 1, 1934—7574 tanks and 326 armored vehicles—more than in the armies of United Kingdom, France and Nazi Germany combined.

The relationship between industrialization and the victory of the Soviet Union over Nazi Germany in the "Great Patriotic War" is a matter of debate. In Soviet times, the view was adopted that industrialization and pre-war rearmament played a decisive role in the victory. However, the superiority of Soviet technology over the German one on the western border of the country on the eve of the war could not stop the enemy.

According to the historian Konstantin Nikitenko, the command-administrative system that was built up nullified the economic contribution of industrialization to the country's defense capability. Vitaly Lelchuk also draws attention to the fact that by the beginning of the winter of 1941 the territory was occupied, where before the war 42% of the population of the Soviet Union lived, 63% of coal were mined, 68% of pig iron smelted, etc. Lelchuk notes that "Victory had to be forged not with the help of the powerful potential that was created during the years of accelerated industrialization". The material and technical base of such giants built during the years of industrialization, such as Novokramatorsk and Makeevka metallurgical plants, DneproGES, etc., was at the disposal of the invaders.

But supporters of the Soviet point of view object that industrialization most affected the Urals and Siberia, while pre-revolutionary industry turned out to be in the occupied territories. They also indicate that the prepared evacuation of industrial equipment to the regions of the Urals, the Volga region, Siberia and Central Asia played a significant role. In the first three months of the war alone, 1,360 large (mostly military) enterprises were displaced.

== Industrialization in literature and art ==
In the Soviet factory

Poetry

- Vladimir Mayakovsky. The Story of Khrenov About Kuznetskstroi and About the People of Kuznetsk (1929)

Prose

- Andrey Platonov. The Foundation Pit (1930)
- Aleksandr Malyshkin. Outback people (1938)

Sculpture

- Vera Mukhina. Worker and Kolkhoz Woman (Moscow, 1937)
- Alexey Zelensky and Vasily Bohun. Metallurgist (Magnitogorsk, 1958)

Movie

- Ivan. Director Alexander Dovzhenko (1932)
- Bright Path. Director Grigory Alexandrov (1940)
- Time, Forward!. Director Mikhail Schweitzer (1965)
- Man of Marble. Director Andrzej Wajda (1977) – the film is dedicated to Poland in the 1950s, but there is a parallel with the Soviet movement of the Stakhanovists.

== See also ==
- Gosplan
- Economy of the Soviet Union
- Enterprises in the Soviet Union
- Industrialization in the Russian Empire
- Left Opposition
- Primitive socialist accumulation
- Scissors Crisis

== Sources ==
- Dmitry Verkhoturov (2006). The Economic Revolution of Stalin. Moscow: Olma-Press. ISBN 5-224-05191-6.
- Industrialisation of the Soviet Union. New documents, New Facts, New Approaches / Edited by Semen Khromov. In 2 parts. Moscow: Institute of Russian History, Russian Academy of Sciences, 1997 and 1999
- The History of the Industrialisation of the Soviet Union 1926–1941. Documents and Materials / Edited by Maxim Kim
- The History of the Industrialisation of the Soviet Union: 1926–1928. Documents and Materials. Moscow: Science. 1969. Archived from the original on 2012-10-22.
- The History of the Industrialisation of the Soviet Union: 1929–1932. Documents and Materials. Moscow: Science. 1970. Archived from the original on 2012-10-22.
- The History of the Industrialisation of the Soviet Union: 1933–1937. Documents and Materials. Moscow: Science. 1971. Archived from the original on 2012-09-20.
- The History of the Industrialisation of the Soviet Union: 1938–1941. Documents and Materials. Moscow: Science. 1972. Archived from the original on 2012-10-22.
- George Polyak, Anna Markova (2002). The History of the World Economy: a Textbook for Universities. Moscow: Unity. p. 727. ISBN 5-238-00066-9.
- Russian History. Theories of Study. Edited by Boris Lichman. Russia in the Late 1920s–1930s
- Mark Meerovich. Fordism and Postfordism. Albert Kahn and Ernst Mai: United States and Germany in the Struggle for Soviet Industrialisation // Postfordism: Concepts, Institutions, Practices / Edited by Mikhail Ilchenko, Victor Martyanov – Moscow: Political Encyclopedia, 2015. ISBN 978-5-8243-1995-8
- Mikhail Mukhin. Amtorg. American tanks for the Red Army // National History — Moscow, 2001. — N 3. — Pages 51–61
- R. W. Davies. The Industrialisation of Soviet Russia. In 5 Volumes. London: Palgrave Macmillan, 1980–2003
- Melnikova-Raich, Sonia. "The Soviet Problem with Two 'Unknowns': How an American Architect and a Soviet Negotiator Jump-Started the Industrialisation of Russia. Part I: Albert Kahn" IA, Journal of the Society for Industrial Archeology 36, no. 2 (2010). ISSN 0160-1040
