= 43 Plan =

1970s technical plan in China

The Four Three Plan or 43 Plan (Chinese: 四三方案; Pinyin: Sìsān fāngàn) was an economic policy taken by the People's Republic of China to introduce complete sets of technical equipment on a large scale from the United States, the Federal Republic of Germany, France, Japan, the Netherlands, Switzerland, Italy and other Western countries in the early 1970s. It was formally proposed in 1973. Since the late 1960s and early 1970s, China made use of foreign exchange reserve as well as deferred payment to import US$4.24 billion of machinery.

== Background ==
Since 1954, China has implemented a coupon system. The number of cloth coupons issued each year needs to be calculated repeatedly and stipulated in a central document. Depending on the climate, the standards in various places are slightly different. Generally speaking, each adult is issued a ticket of 16 feet, 18 feet or 20 feet per year (a pillow towel requires about 2 feet of tickets). This is a serious issue because the annual cotton output has been hovering at more than 40 million tons, and textile raw materials are in short supply.

In order to solve the problem of cotton production, Zhou Enlai held a cotton work meeting every year. Moreover, increasing cotton production also faces the problem of competition for land between grain and cotton. At that time, in industrialized countries, chemical fibers accounted for 40% or more of textile raw materials. In China, this proportion is only 5.5%.

In July 1970, the former Ministry of Textile Industry, the First Ministry of Light Industry, and the Second Ministry of Light Industry were officially merged into the Ministry of Light Industry, with Qian Zhiguang as minister. Zhou Enlai announced: The country will focus on light industry, light industry will focus on textiles, and textiles will focus on chemical fibers.

== Planning procedure ==
Gu Xiulian, an outstanding young female cadre and model worker carefully cultivated by the Ministry of Textiles, was chosen by the organization and transferred to the planning team. In the second half of 1971, Qian Zhiguang proposed that China's own oil and gas resources could be used to build several chemical fiber bases with a production capacity of 1 million tons, equivalent to 20 million dans of cotton. The required technical equipment can be imported from abroad. In this regard, Zhou Enlai and Li Xiannian instructed the State Planning Commission to study and consider introducing chemical fiber equipment to solve the clothing problem and fertilizer equipment to solve the problem.
