= Ippolit Sokolov =

Soviet theatre critic, screenwriter and poet

Ippolit Vasilevich Sokolov (Russian: Ипполит Соколов 1902, Kharkov – 8 December 1974) was a Soviet theatre critic, screenwriter and poet. He became involved with the Moscow-based Central Institute of Labour.

Ippolit Sokolov was born into a working-class family. He started his literary activity when he was 14. In 1918 he moved to Moscow where he studied at the Socialist Academy in the political and legal department.

== Russian Expressionism ==
Sokolov became a Russian advocate of Expressionism. He visited the Poetry Studio, where Valery Bryusov, Andrei Bely and Vyacheslav Ivanov. He also became involved in the Literary section of the Moscow branch of Proletkult. In 1919 he joined the All-Russian Union of Poets. During the three years, from 1919 to 1921, he published nine pamphlets of poems and articles, including his Complete Works. Through these texts he formulated Expressionism as the "maximum of expressions" with a "dynamism of perception and thinking". In his Guide-Book to Expressionism he described expressionism as "a synthesis of all achievements in all arts." However the Russian Expressionist movement was short-lived.

== industrial gymnastics ==
In 1921 he took up military service as the head of the artistic department of the Political Secretariat of the Moscow Military District, in which role he linked labour and military gymnastics. This led to his work with the Central Institute of Labor. He applied François Delsarte's “harmonic gymnastics” creating a secularised version of “industrial gymnastics” similar to the “eukinetics” put forward by Rudolf Laban.

== Theatre and film ==
In 1922 he started to have material published about cinema. He graduated from Moscow University in 1925. He then taught the course "Modern Theatre" at the State workshops at the Chamber Theatre. His reputation as a film critic and film historian grew, and he taught at the State Technical School of Cinematography (1927–1928), the Maxim Gorky Literature Institute (1943-1945), the Gerasimov Institute of Cinematography (1946). In 1948–1951, he was a research associate at the All-Russia State Institute of Cinematography Research and Development, and in 1961–1964 he taught a theory and history of cinema course at Moscow University. From 1966 he worked on the technology of television films at the All-Union Scientific Research Institute of Magnetic Recording and Television Technology.

== Works ==
- Bunt ekspressionista (Expressionist Revolt 1919) Moscow: privately printed by the author, Autumn 1919
- Renessanc XX veka (Twentieth Century Renaissance 1919) Moscow: 1919. 8 pp
- Bedeker po ekspressionizmu (Guide-Book to Expressionism, 1920) Moscow: privately printed by the author 8vo. A single folded sheet.
- Ekspressionizm (Expressionism 1920). Moscow: privately printed by the author, Summer 1920. A single folded sheet.
- Ekspressionisty (Expressionists 1921) Moscow: Sad Akadema, 1921. 16 pp. with contributions by Yevgeny Gabrilovich, Boris Lapin and Sergei Spasski.
- A (1921) Moscow: 1921. 12mo. 14 pp. with contributions by Boris Pereleshin and Aleksandr Rakitnikov
- Polnoe sobranie sochinenii (Complete Collected Works 1919 Moscow: 12 pp
- "Industrializatsiia zhestikuliatsii", Ermitazh, 10 (1922), pp 6–7
- "Novaia fizkul’tura proletariata", Gorn, 2 (1922), pp 28–36
- Sistema trudovoi gimnastiki Moscow: Vsevobuch, 1922)
- "Teatralizatsiia fizkul’tury" Ermitazh, 7 (1922), 15
