= Ci-devant =

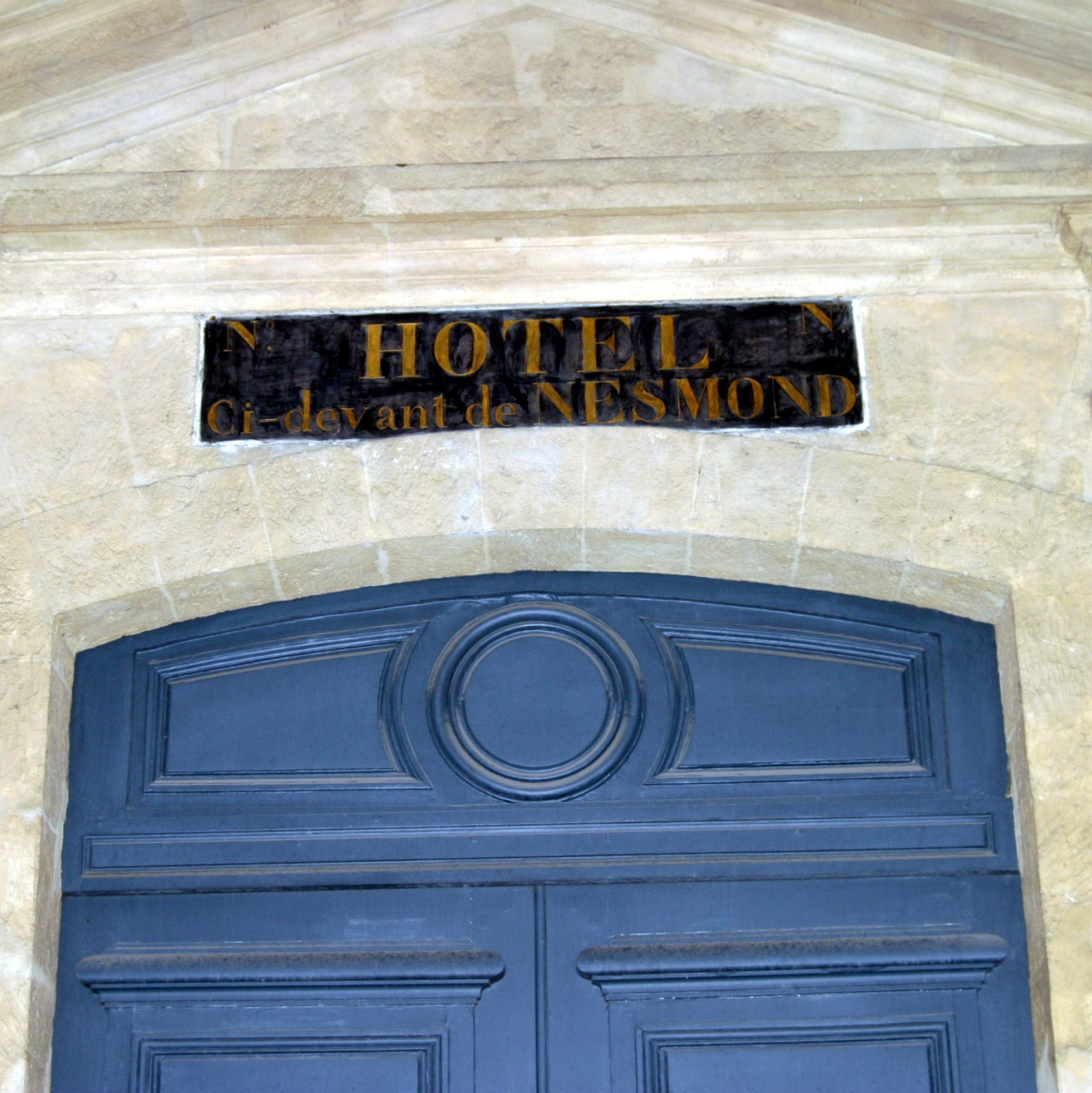
A ci-devant plaque at the Hôtel de Nesmond in Paris

In post-Revolutionary France, ci-devant nobility were those nobles who refused to be reconstituted into the new social order or to accept any of the political, cultural, or social changes brought about in France by the French Revolution. They were often distinguished by their manners as much as by their political views, both of which remained loyal to the attitudes and values of pre-Revolutionary France.

== Meaning ==
The term ci-devant [si.də.vɑ̃], itself often derogatory, comes from the French, meaning "from before" and technically applied to members of the French nobility of the ancien régime (pre-Revolutionary French society) after they had lost their titles and privileges during the French Revolution. Despite the formal abolition of the titles of nobility by the First Republic, most aristocrats did not accept the legality of this move and there are still numerous families in France with aristocratic titles today.

"Ci-devant" may be compared to the English language term late, as in deceased, as it expresses the figurative death of the nobility during the legislative agenda of the Revolution. Prior to the Revolution, the term ci-devant was a common expression, although then it was used to refer to aristocrats who had fallen into financial or social ruin - namely "people or things dispossessed of their estate or quality."

== History ==
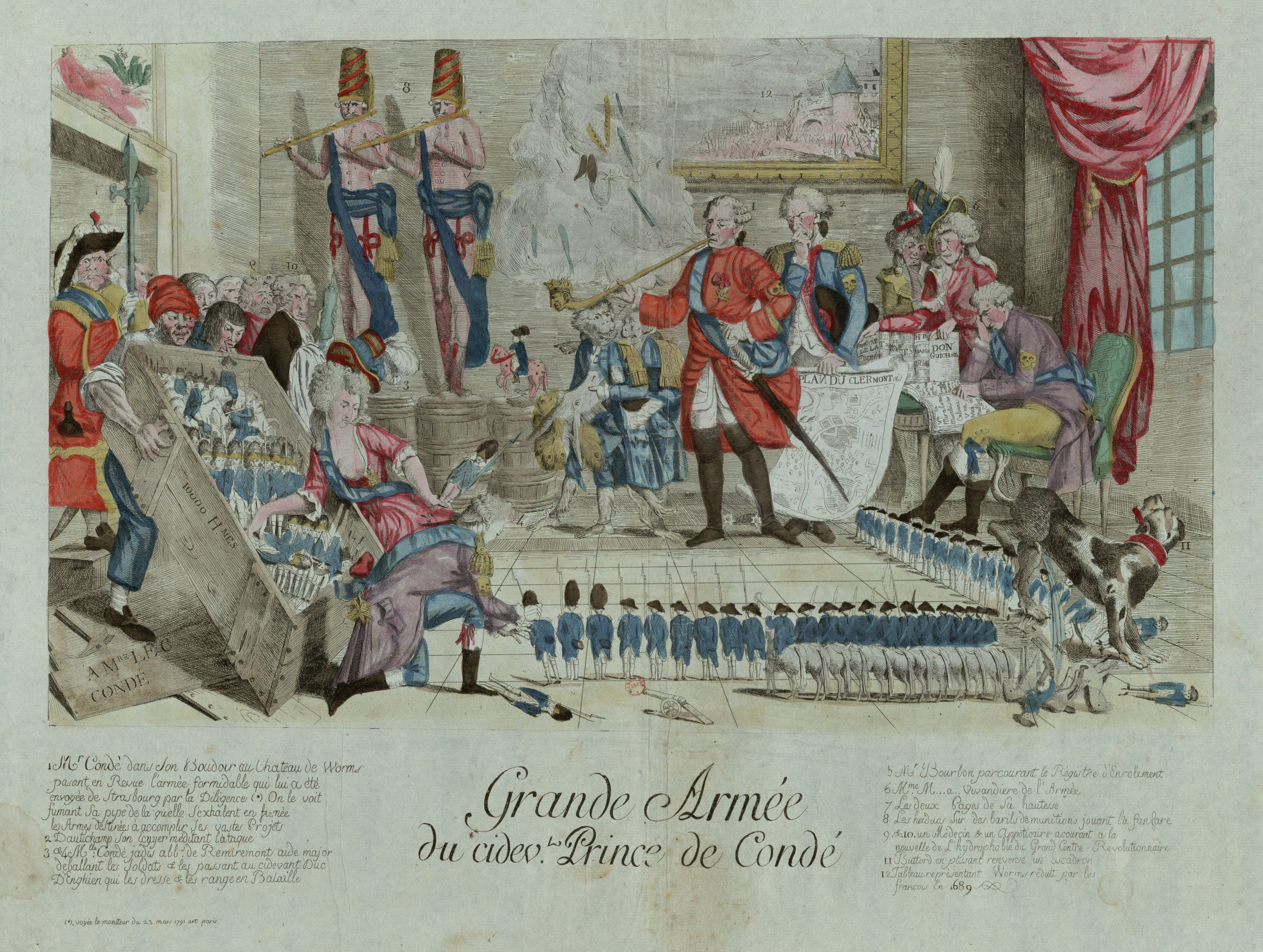
A 1792 satirical cartoon: Grande Armée du cidev[ant] prince de Condé ("Great Army of the From-Before Prince of Condé")

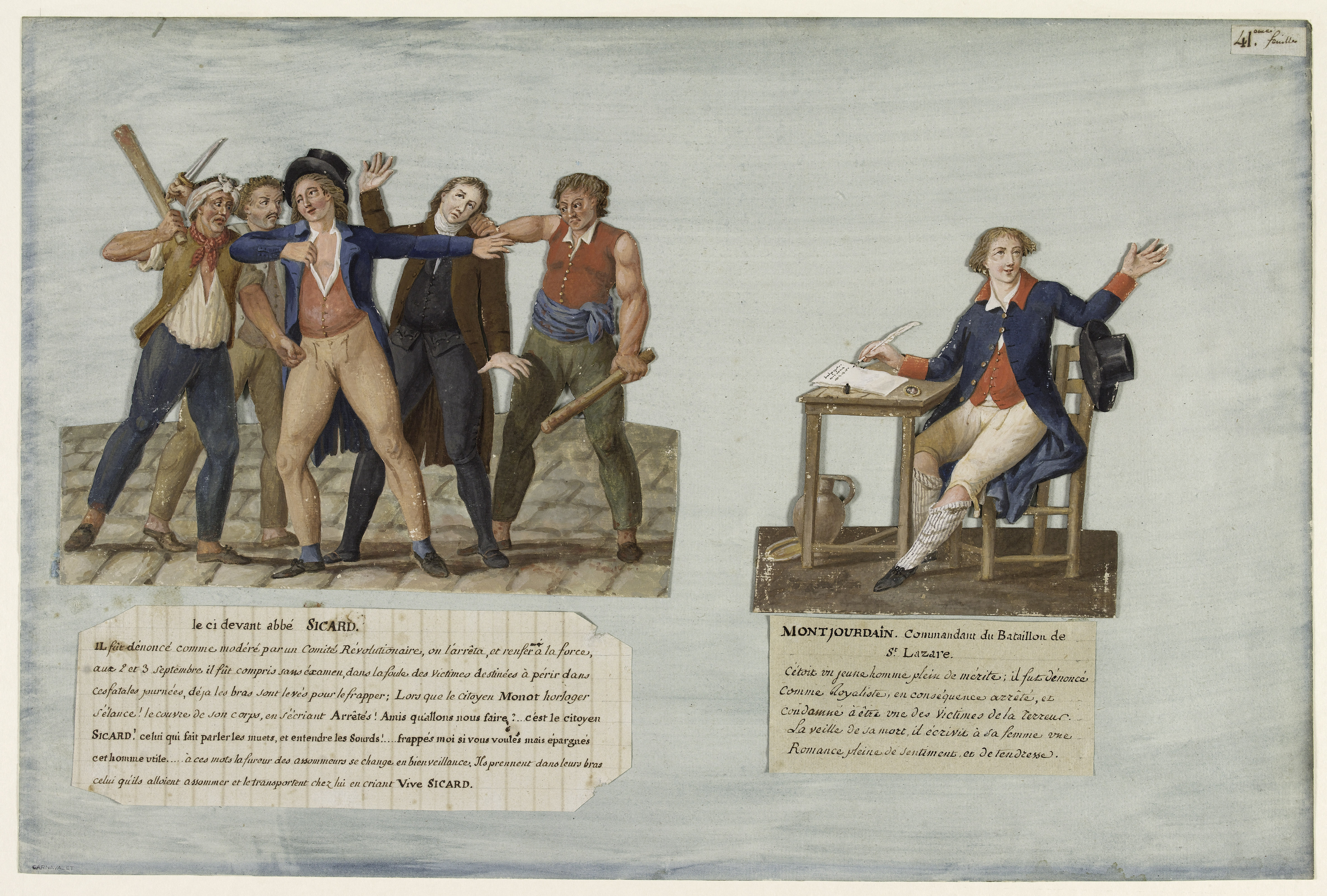
A depiction of the liberation of the ci-devant Abbé Sicard

During the revolutionary era, the connotations of the term were strictly derogatory, since it was typically used by people hostile to the nobility. For instance, one could say "le ci-devant comte" ("the from-before Count") about someone who held the title of a count during the ancien régime, but was now, according to the Revolution, a mere citizen.

The term could also be used to refer to areas noted for their high levels of royalist sympathy or aristocratic communities - such as les ci-devants de Coblence, with Coblence (Koblenz) being the town where many exiled aristocrats fled during the first two years of the revolution and where many of their early plans to restore the monarchy were distilled. Hundreds of thousands of non-aristocratic French men and women, who were opposed to the revolution for political, cultural or religious reasons, also emigrated abroad between 1789 and 1794 and that, eventually, the term ci-devant came to be applied to them as well, indicating that their politics were "from before."

In French, the term still retains this negative connotation. Those sympathetic to the historical aims of the counter-revolutionaries or who do not wish to use a historical phrase that comes with so many perceived political connotations and judgements usually use the phrase Vieille Noblesse ("Old Nobility") to refer to the aristocracy that existed prior to 1789 - or those today whose family lineage stretches back to before the Revolution. In English, the usage of ci-devant is less clear. One might refer to ci-devant nobility simply to distinguish them from later nobility created by Napoleon Bonaparte under the First French Empire, or by Louis XVIII and Charles X under the Bourbon Restoration.

== In literature ==
Culturally, there have been some instances of ci-devant being used in a positive or sympathetic manner, mostly by those critical of the French revolution.

- In the novel The Scarlet Pimpernel (1905), the aristocrat Baroness Orczy refers to "ci-devant counts, marquises, even dukes, who wanted to fly from France, reach England or some other equally accursed country, and there try to rouse foreign feeling against the glorious Revolution or to raise an army in order to liberate the wretched prisoners in the Temple, who had once called themselves sovereigns of France."
- Joseph Conrad in The Rover, published 1923, set during the French Revolutionary and Napoleonic period, wrote of a "hunter of the ci-devants and priests, purveyor of the guillotine, in short a blood-drinker."
- The character D'Hubert in Conrad's "The Duel" is also a ci-devant, though more sympathetically portrayed, and the term itself is not explicitly mentioned.

== See also ==
- Former people
- Incroyables and Merveilleuses
