= Lishenets =

Class of disenfranchised people from the Soviet Union

A lishenets (Russian: лишенец, IPA: [lʲɪˈʂenʲɪt͡s]), lit. лишение deprivation + -ец -ee; "disenfranchised"; plural lishentsy, Russian: лишенцы) was a disenfranchised person in Soviet Russia from 1918 to 1936.

== History ==
The 1918 Constitution of the Russian Soviet Federative Socialist Republic enumerated the categories of disenfranchised people:

- Persons who used hired labor to obtain increase in profits
- Persons who have income without doing any work, such as interests from capital, receipts from property, etc.
- Private merchants, trade and commercial brokers
- Monks and clergy of all denominations
- Persons who were policemen or military officers before the October Revolution
- Persons who have been declared demented or mentally deficient, persons under guardianship, etc.

The Russian Communist Party (Bolsheviks) used disfranchisement as a means of repression against categories of the population that were classified as "enemies of the working people", first in the Russian Soviet Federative Socialist Republic and later the Soviet Union after its founding in 1922. A person deemed to be a lishenets by Soviet authorities was subsequently stripped of their right to vote or to be elected by the enfranchised.

The 1924 Soviet Constitution and subsequent decrees detailed this list further and added new categories, and being disenfranchised meant much more than simply being disallowed to vote or be elected. A lishenets could not occupy any governmental position, could not receive higher and technical education, could not be a member of kolkhozes and other kinds of cooperatives, and was deprived of various privileges and subsidies for employment, housing, retirement, etc.

The voting rights of a lishenets could be restored by local election commissions upon the proof of engagement in productive labor and of loyalty to the Soviets. The ultimate authorities for the rights of lishentsy were the Central Election Commission and Presidium of the Central Executive Committee.

The 1936 Soviet Constitution instituted universal suffrage, and the category of lishenets was officially eliminated.

== See also ==
- 101st kilometre rule
- Former people
- Wolf ticket (Russia)
- Rear militia
