= Grain rationing in China =

Chinese economic policy

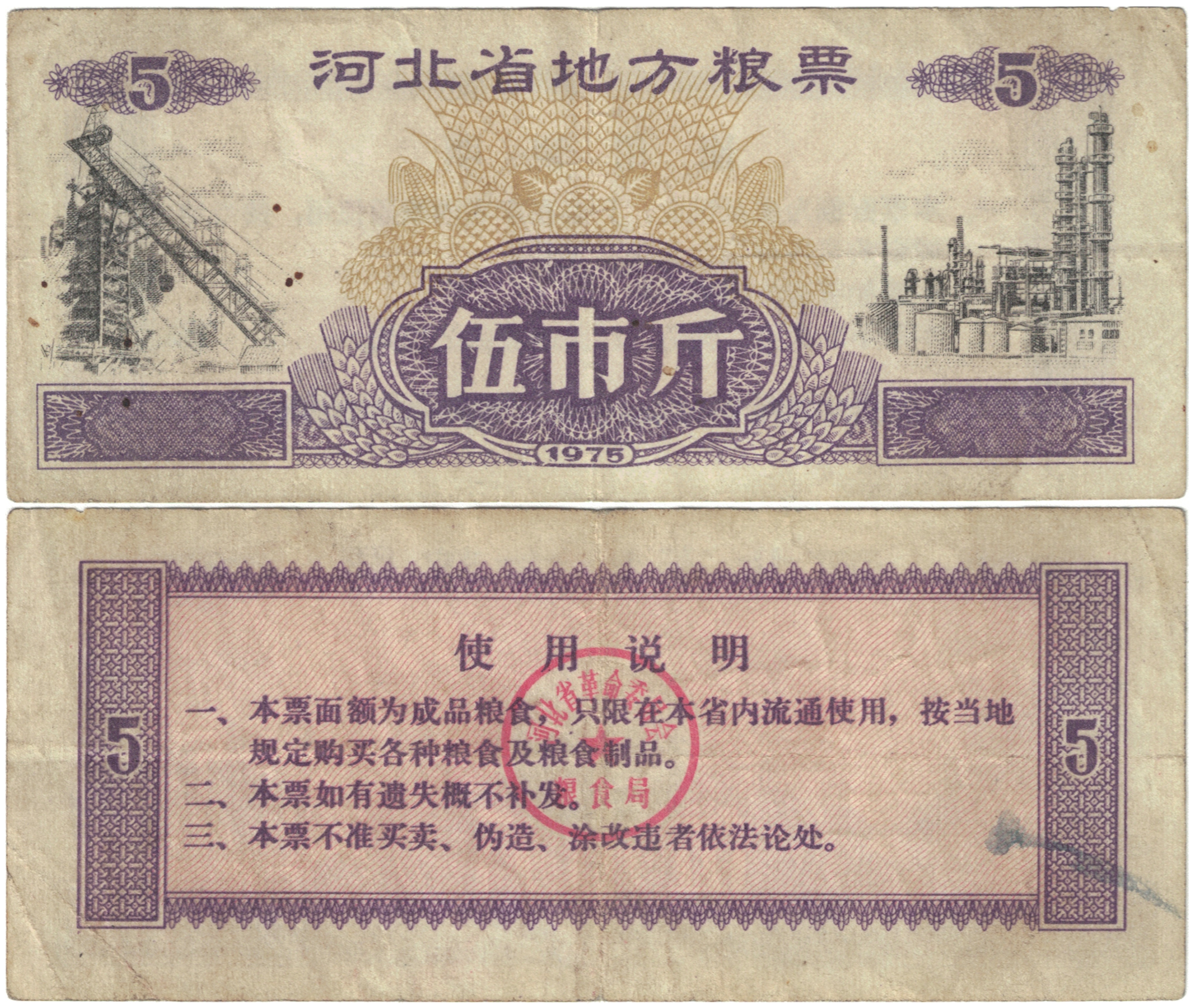
Grain coupon from Hebei province, 1975

A grain rationing system was implemented by the People's Republic of China in 1955 to control food production and boost industrialization. This system relied heavily on the use of grain coupons (Chinese: 粮票; Pinyin: Liáng piào), which were a critical tool for implementing the policy. These grain coupons were issued by the government and distributed to households. This system allowed urban households to access grain at lower prices, while rural areas, after fulfilling state-imposed quotas, could sell excess supply at market prices. The grain coupon system gradually phased out as China transitioned towards market-oriented reforms in the 1980s and early 1990s. By 1993, grain coupons were fully abolished, marking the end of the planned economy era.

== History ==
Since the establishment of the People's Republic of China (PRC) in 1949, China has undergone several economic transformations. Agricultural production in rural areas transitioned from private farming to collectivization and later back to household production. This is seen in two main policy eras: the era of central planning (1950s-1978), and the era of economic decentralization (post-1978).

In 1955, the Chinese government implemented nationwide grain rationing. During the era of central planning, the government aimed to boost industrialization and urban growth by securing food supplies from the rural areas through stringent policies. The state maintained a monopoly over pricing, setting agricultural and industrial prices at low levels to ensure low-cost food supplies for urban workers, which facilitated higher industrial profits and reinvestment in urban development.

In the 1950s, communes were established in rural areas and the government imposed 'procurement planning', which required peasants to deliver a certain amount of food to the state at state-imposed prices. However, demand exceeded supply and the agricultural sector became very inefficient. The government tried to solve this problem by introducing a grain rationing system, combining consumer rationing and compulsory purchases from producers. The gradual development of a free market put an end to the rationing system and introduced dual prices. This is where the price scissors phenomenon emerged.

== Grain rationing system ==
The grain rationing system operated under the assumption that there were two distinct sectors in the economy: rural and urban, each producing two types of goods: manufactured goods and food. It also assumed that the supply of the two goods is fixed, meaning that there were set quantities available for consumption and trade. This framework helps to illustrate how much food a peasant household would sell in exchange for manufactured goods.

To address the price scissors problem, which referred to the disparity between the prices of industrial goods and agricultural products, the Chinese government imposed production quotas on rural households. The government maintained low urban wages to keep urban food demand low, preventing inflation and ensuring that the industrial sector remained competitive.

The grain coupon allowed people to purchase a specific amount of grain at a low, state-imposed price, which varied based on factors such as age, profession, and location. Each household received a monthly allotment of coupons, which includes various other coupons and certificates were used for goods such as oil, cloth, meat and other essentials. Any quantity exceeding the coupon quota had to be purchased at market prices, creating a kinked budget constraint for urban households.

== Long-term consequences ==
The long-term consequences of the grain rationing system included the entrenchment of rural-urban disparities and inefficiencies in agricultural production. The state's focus on industrialization at the expense of agricultural development led to significant socio-economic imbalances. The eventual abolition of the grain rationing system in 1993 marked a shift towards market-oriented reforms, which aimed to rectify these imbalances by liberalizing agricultural markets and incentivizing rural production.
