= Former people =

Russian people who lost their high social status

In the Russian language and culture, "former people" (Russian: Бывшие люди, romanized: byvshiye lyudi) are people who lost their high social status. The expression went into wide circulation in the Russian Empire after the 1897 short story of Maxim Gorky Byvshiye lyudi (Бывшие люди), translated in English as Creatures That Once Were Men, about people fallen from prosperity into an abyss of misery. At the end of the 19th century, for Gorky, "former people" were objects of pity and compassion. With the establishment of Soviet power, "former people" in a new sense became the target of persecution.

After the October Revolution, the expression referred to people who lost their social status after the revolution: aristocracy, imperial military, bureaucracy, clergy, etc.

== "Former people" in Soviet Russia ==
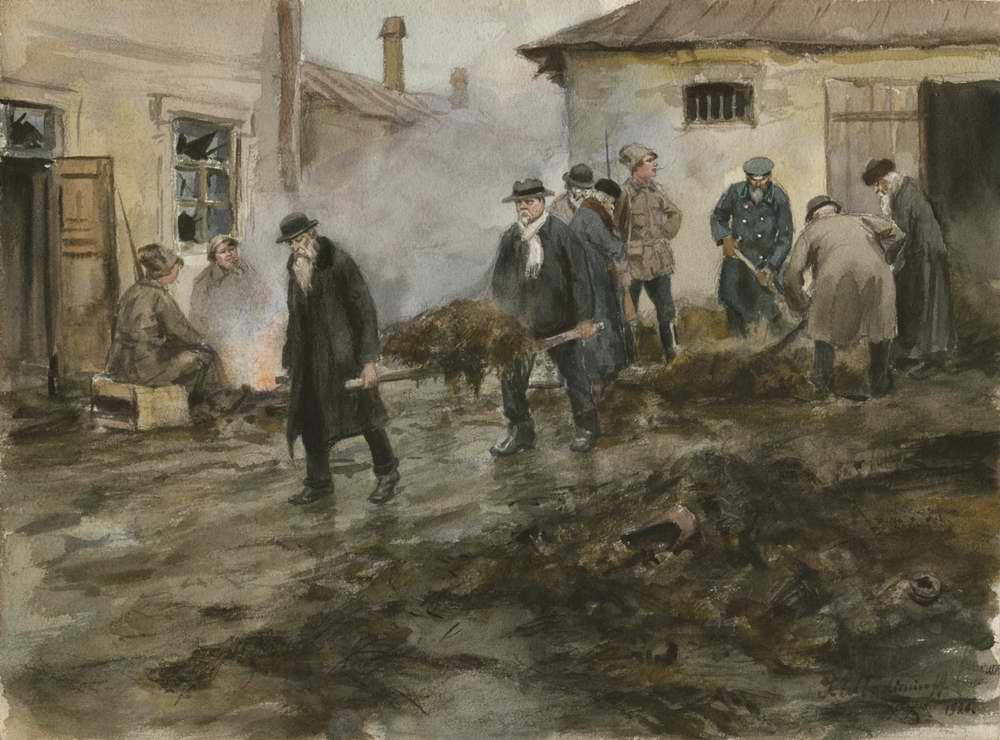
"Former" cleaning up manure. Painting by Ivan Vladimirov

While the "former people" of Gorky were the object of pity and compassion, from the very first days of the Soviet power, the "former people" in the new meaning became a target of severe persecution. In March 1935, during the wave of repressions after the assassination of Sergey Kirov, the NKVD carried out Operation "Former People". 11,000 "former people" were arrested or deported from Leningrad, whose Communist Party organization Kirov had headed and where he was killed, according to Directive No. 29 of February 27, 1935, "On the eviction of a counter-revolutionary element from Leningrad and suburban areas to remote areas of the country.".

In April 1935, NKVD chief Genrikh Yagoda expanded the scope of the operation to cleanse the border region of Leningrad Oblast and Karelian ASSR from further 22,000 "formers". A further 8,000 were deported from the area during the so-called "passport operations".

During the peak of the Great Purge, the cleansing of the country from the "former people" was explained by the necessity to eliminate the "insurgence base" in the case of a war.

The 1939 NKVD Order No. 001223, which established the detailed bureaucratic procedures for keeping track of "anti-Soviet and socially alien elements", defined the category of "former people" as follows: "former tsarist and White Army administration, former dvoryans [Russian nobility], pomeshchiks (noble landowners), merchants and petty merchants, those who employ hired labor, industrialists, and others".

The number of "former people" was in the millions. In 1913 in Russia, there were between 22 and 35 million relatively wealthy people, counting both urban and rural population.

== In works ==
- Historian Douglas Smith's book, Former People: The Final Days of the Russian Aristocracy, traces the calamities of two representative aristocratic families, the Golitsyns and the Sheremetevs.
- Amor Towles' novel A Gentleman in Moscow chronicles the tale of a former person imprisoned in the Moscow hotel Metropol for much of his adult life.

== See also ==
- Ci-devant
- Five Black Categories
- Lishenets
- New People (Cambodia)
- Superfluous man
- Unperson
