= Rear militia =

Rear militia (Russian: Тыловое ополчение) was a category of military service in Soviet Russia and the Soviet Union in 1918–1937.

The composition of the rear militia called various so-called "unearned elements" (kulaks, clergy, former nobles, and so on) that were not subject to conscription in combat units of the Red Army, the Armed Forces of the Soviet Union. The rear militia was formed after the introduction of universal conscription in 1918.

In 1937, after changes in the law on universal conscription by Order of the People's Commissariat of Defense No. 020, of February 20, 1937, the rear militia department was reorganized into the Directorate of the Red Army building units.

== Creation of rear militia ==
Initially, the Red Army was formed on a voluntary basis, but soon, in the conditions of the expanding Civil War, the Soviet government turned to a forced recruitment into its ranks. Universal military service was enshrined in the first Soviet Constitution of 1918, article 19 of which reads:

In order to fully protect the achievements of the Great Workers' and Peasants' Revolution, the Russian Socialist Federative Soviet Republic recognizes the duty of all citizens of the Republic to the defense of the socialist Fatherland and establishes a general military duty. The honorable right to defend the revolution in arms is given only to workers; non-labor elements are charged with the discharge of other military duties.

All "non-labor elements" (the so-called disenfranchised) were subject to conscription in the rear militia. During the civil war, the labor militia was used on various military and civilian constructions.

== Rear militia after the end of the Civil War ==
After the end of the civil war in 1923–1924, the deprived were serving conscription in special non-military "service teams".

In 1925, during the implementation of military reform and the general reduction of the armed forces, the existence of such teams was deemed inexpedient. According to the law on compulsory military service, who have been deprived since being called up to military service of their peers, they were subject to mandatory admission to the rear militia. Since in peacetime the creation of parts of the rear militia was not provided for, then those enrolled in the rear militia were subject to a special war tax.

This tax was levied by the financial authorities at a rate of between half and the basic income tax salary and went to the social security fund to help people with disabilities of the civil war. The people enrolled in the rear militia were on a special military account. Instead of the usual registration and military tickets, they were given "white tickets" (white forms were used).

== Rear militia in the early 1930s ==
In connection with the forced industrialization, on December 7, 1931, a resolution was adopted by the Central Executive Committee and the Council of People's Commissars of the Soviet Union "On the Use of Labor of Citizens in the Logistics Militia". It stated that part of the rear militia carried out defense-strategic works through the High Council of the National Economy of the Soviet Union, the People's Commissariat of Communications and the Central Administration of Highways and Dirt Roads and Automobile Transport.

The tenure in these parts was set to three years. After this period, the militiamen, "who showed a conscientious attitude to work", should have been restored to the right to vote. It was noted that "the labor regime and political education in the parts of the rear militia should pursue the goal of making non-labor elements useful in all respects citizens of the Soviet Union". The People's Commissariat of Labor of the Soviet Union organized the recruitment and subsequent distribution of militiamen by squads between departments.

As of February 1, 1933, there were about 42,000 people in the offices of units of militiamen of the three commissariats and departments (the People's Commissariat of Heavy Industry, the People's Commissariat of Communication Routes and the Central Highway and Dirt and Road Administration).

On September 27, 1933, by a decree of the Central Executive Committee and the Council of People's Commissars of the Soviet Union “On the rear militia", it was established that "parts of the rear militia are subordinated in all respects to the People’s Commissariat for Military and Naval Affairs. These units are used for defense-strategic works performed by the people's commissariat for military and maritime affairs, as well as by other departments. At the disposal of other departments, parts of the rear militia are provided for work on the basis of contracts annually concluded by the People's Commissariat with the appropriate departments".

It was noted that the militiamen serve for a period of not more than three years, the order of their service is regulated by special statutes in relation to the relevant statutes of the Red Army, "the commanding personnel of the rear militia units are completed from the Red Army commanding staff and considered to be in the Red Army personnel". It was stated that "units of the rear militia are contained on the basis of self-sufficiency at the expense of funds received from the departments (including the Commissariat for Military and Naval Affairs)".

In the process of the adoption of militia units by military people's commissariats from civilian people's commissariats, according to the order of the Revolutionary Military Council of the Soviet Union of October 11, 1933, the Directorate of rear militia was created as part of the Main Directorate of the Red Army.

In January 1934, when the People's Commissariat of Defense reorganized the militia units adopted from civilian commissariats, they numbered 47.3 thousand. In subsequent years, the dynamics of numbers was as follows (on January 1 of each year):

- 1935 – 42.2 thousand;
- 1936 – 43.0 thousand;
- 1937 – 24.5 thousand people.

Militiamen worked at the construction of railways, in mines. Their conditions of detention were very difficult. A survey conducted in the spring of 1931 showed that labor camp formations in Prokopyevsk and Anzherka are located in difficult conditions, in damp barracks and built in a hurry. About the nutrition of Prokopyevsk's militiamen, it was said: "While civilian workers have meat soup, for the second cutlets and for the third sweet, the militiamen get cabbage soup, for the second potato with fish".

By order of the People's Commissar of Defense of February 20, 1937, units of the rear militia were reorganized into building units of the Red Army.

Later the Construction Troops (ru:Строительные войска) gained significant importance.

== See also ==
- Alternative civilian service
