= Creatures That Once Were Men =

1897 novella by Maxim Gorky

- Short story by Maxim Gorky
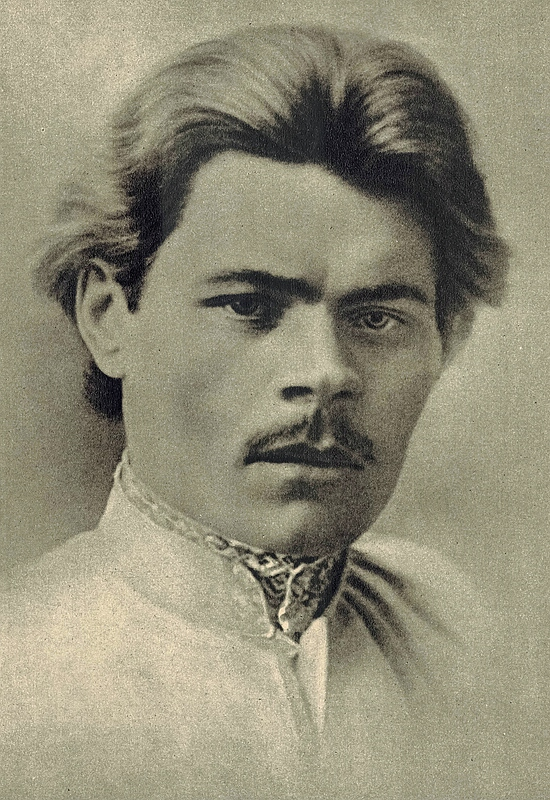
- Maxim Gorky, writer of Creatures That Once Were Men in 1889.
- Original title: Бывшие люди
- Country: Russian Empire
- Language: Russian

Publication
- Publication date: 1897

"Creatures That Once Were Men" (Russian: Бывшие люди, romanized: Byvshiye lyudi, lit. 'former people') is an 1897 novella by the Russian writer Maxim Gorky. It is regarded as a work of social realism, and it depicts the bottom of Russian society (like Gorky's other early works, including his most famous play The Lower Depths) First published in Novoye Slovo in 1897, the novella was included in Gorky's collection Sketches and Stories (1899).

The term "former people" developed other meanings, relating to Russian society.

== Plot ==
Creatures that Once Were Men is a novella about residents of a doss house who start a conflict with their landlord, which leads to an inhumane outcome.

At the end, there's a notable dialogue between the two main characters:

"What are you? Who are you?" shouted Petunikov.
A man . . ." he answered in a hoarse voice.

== Reception ==
It is no exaggeration to say that these people of whom Gorky writes in such a story as this of "Creatures That Once Were Men" are to the Western mind children. They have, indeed, been tortured and broken by experience and sin. But this has only sufficed to make them sad children or naughty children or bewildered children... And this note of plainness and of something nobly prosaic is as characteristic of Gorky, the most recent and in some ways the most modern and sophisticated of Russian authors, as it is of Tolstoy or any of the Tolstoyan type of mind. The Russian novelist, when he describes a dosshouse, says, "Creatures That Once Were Men." And we are arrested, and regard the facts as a kind of terrible fairy tale. This story is a test case of the Russian manner, for it is in itself a study of decay, a study of failure, and a study of old age. And yet the author is forced to write even of staleness freshly; and though he is treating of the world as seen by eyes darkened or blood-shot with evil experience, his own eyes look out upon the scene with a clarity that is almost babyish. Through all runs that curious Russian sense that every man is only a man...

— G. K. Chesterton

About 1897 Realism begins to outweigh Romanticism, and in "Ex-People" (Byvshii lyudi, 1897; in the English version, "Creatures That Once Were Men", an arbitrary mistranslation) Realism is dominant, and the heroic gestures of Captain Kuvalda fail to relieve the drab gloom of the setting. In this story and in all other stories of these years, a feature appears which was to be the undoing of Gorky: an immoderate love for "philosophical" conversations. As long as he kept free from it he gave proof of a great power of construction, a power which is rare in Russian writers, and which gives some of his early stories a solidness and cohesion almost comparable to Chekhov's.

— D. S. Mirsky

== See also ==
- The Lower Depths
