= The Lower Depths =

Play by Maxim Gorky

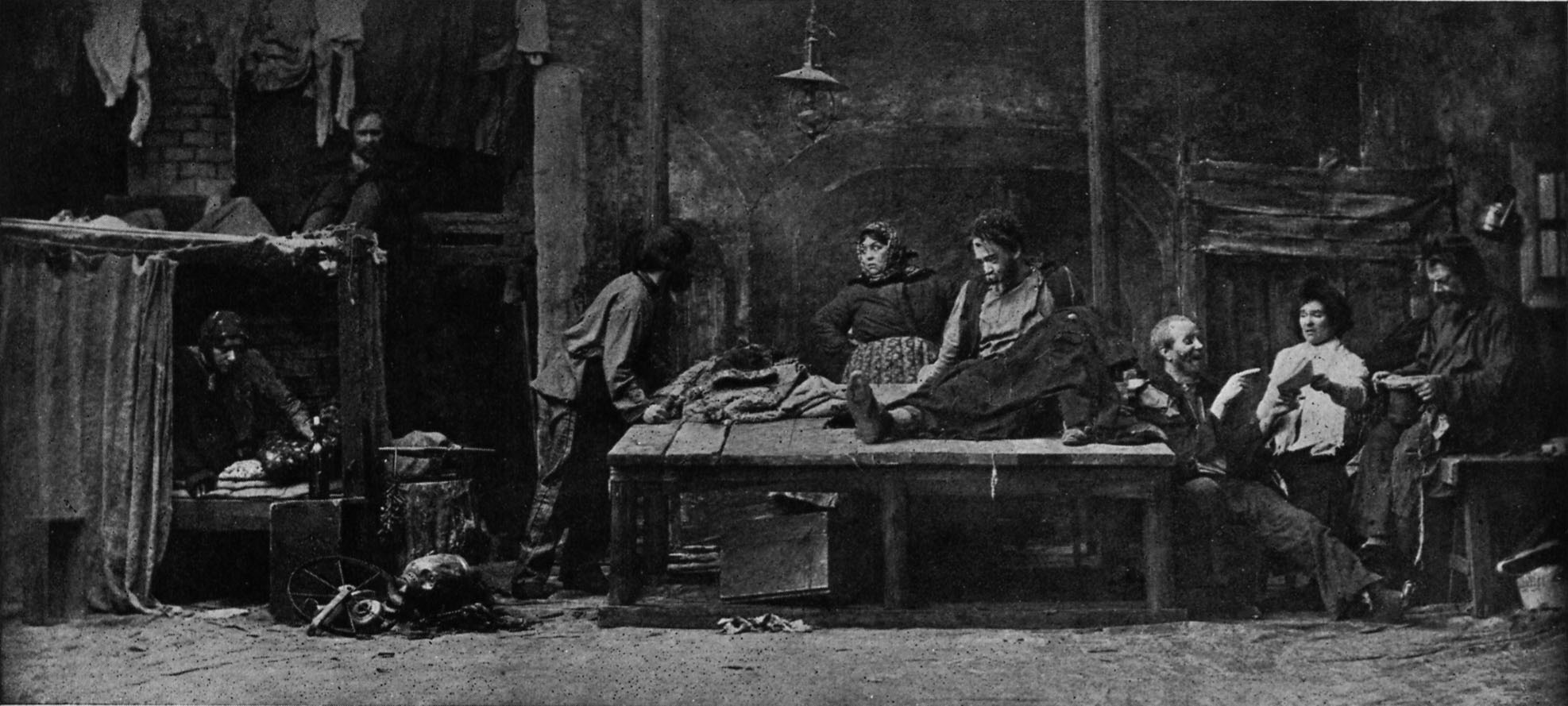
- Original language: Russian
- Written by: Maxim Gorky

Premiere
- Date: 18 December 1902
- Place: Moscow Art Theatre, Moscow, Russia

The Lower Depths (Russian: На дне, romanized: Na dne, lit. 'At the bottom') is a play by Russian writer Maxim Gorky written in 1902 and produced by the Moscow Arts Theatre on December 18, 1902, under the direction of Konstantin Stanislavski. It became his first major success, and a hallmark of Russian social realism. The play depicts a group of impoverished Russians living in a homeless shelter near the Volga.

When it first appeared, The Lower Depths was criticized for its pessimism and ambiguous ethical message. The presentation of the lower classes was viewed as overly dark and unredemptive, and Gorky was clearly more interested in creating memorable characters than in advancing a formal plot. However, in this respect, the play is generally regarded as a masterwork.

The theme of harsh truth versus the comforting lie pervades the play; most of the characters choose to deceive themselves over the bleak reality of their condition.

== Characters ==
- Mikhail Ivanov Kostylyov – keeper of a night lodging
- Vasilisa Karpovna – his wife
- Natasha – her sister
- Medvedev – her uncle, a policeman
- Vaska Pepel – a young thief
- Andrei Mitritch Kleshtсh – a locksmith
- Anna – his wife
- Nastya – a street-walker
- Kvashnya – a vendor of meat-pies
- Bubnov – a cap-maker
- The Baron
- Satine
- The Actor
- Luka – a pilgrim
- Alyoshka – a shoemaker
- The Tatar
- Krivoi Zob

== Plot ==
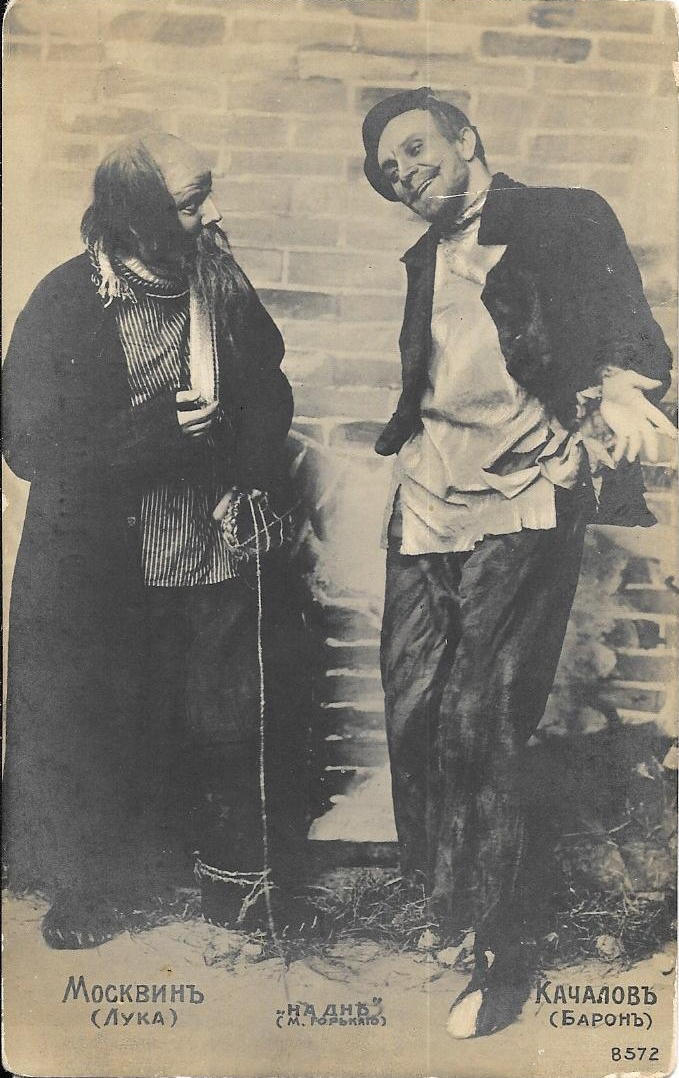
Ivan Moskvin as Luka and Vasily Kachalov as the Baron, Moscow Art Theatre, 1902

In the cellar of a small boarding house, thin boards partition off the room of Vaska, a young thief. In the kitchen live Kvashnya (Dough), a vendor of meat pies, the decrepit Baron, and the streetwalker Nastya. Other lodgers sleep in bunks in the same room.

Nastya is reading a novel titled Fatal Love. The Baron, who lives largely on Nastya's earnings, seizes the book and mocks Nastya. Satin rises from his bunk, knowing only that he took a beating the night before, and the others tell him he had been caught cheating at cards. The Actor wakes in his bed on top of the stove. He predicts that someday Satin will be beaten to death.

The Actor reminds the Baron to sweep the floor to satisfy the strict landlady. The Baron and Kvashnya leave to go shopping. The Actor claims a doctor has told him he has an organ poisoned by alcohol, and sweeping the floor would be bad for his health. Anna, who is dying of consumption, lies in her bunk while her husband, Kleshtch (Tick), works at his bench, fitting old keys and locks. Anna offers him the dumplings that Kvashnya has left for her in the pot. Kleshtch agrees that there is no use feeding a dying woman, and eats the dumplings. The Actor helps Anna down from her bed and into the hall. As they go through the door, the landlord, Kostylyov, enters, nearly knocking them down. He looks around the dirty cellar and tells Kleshtch that he is taking up too much room and that henceforth the rent will be increased. Then Kostylyov asks Vaska furtively if his wife has been in; he suspects that his wife, Vasilisa, is sleeping with Vaska. The thief comes out of his room and denounces the landlord for not paying his debts, saying that Kostylyov still owes seven roubles for a watch he had bought. Ordering Kostylyov to produce the money immediately, Vaska sends him out of the room. The others admire Vaska for his courage and urge him to kill Kostylyov and marry Vasilisa, so he can be the landlord. Vaska decides that he is too softhearted to be a landlord, especially as he is thinking of discarding Vasilisa for her sister, Natasha. Satin asks Vaska for twenty kopecks, which he gives him.

Natasha comes in with the tramp Luka, who is put in the kitchen to sleep with the three already there. Luka begins to sing, but the others object. When Vasilisa comes in, she gives orders for an immediate sweeping of the floor. She asks to see Luka's passport, but he has none, making him more readily accepted by the others. Medvedev, who is a policeman and Vasilisa's uncle, enters the cellar and begins to question Luka, but when the tramp calls him sergeant, Medvedev leaves him alone.

That night, Anna lies in her bunk while a noisy card game goes on. Luka talks gently to her, and Kleshtch comes occasionally to check on her. Luka remarks that her death will be hard on her husband, but Anna accuses Kleshtch of causing her death, and says that she looks forward to rest and peace after her death.

The card players become louder and Satin is accused of cheating. Luka quietens them down. He tells Vaska that he will be able to reform in Siberia, and he assures the Actor that at a sanatorium he could be cured of alcoholism. Vasilisa comes in and offers Vaska three hundred rubles to kill Kostylyov. Vaska knows he would be free to marry Natasha, who is recovering from a beating given to her by her jealous sister, and he is about to refuse when Kostylyov enters; Vaska pushes him out of the cellar.

Luka has overheard everything and warns Vaska not to have anything to do with Vasilisa. Luka sees that Anna is dead and Kleshtch is brought to look at her body, which he agrees to take outside. The Actor begins to cavort in joy, saying he has made up his mind to go to the sanatorium. Luka has told him that he can even be cured at state expense.

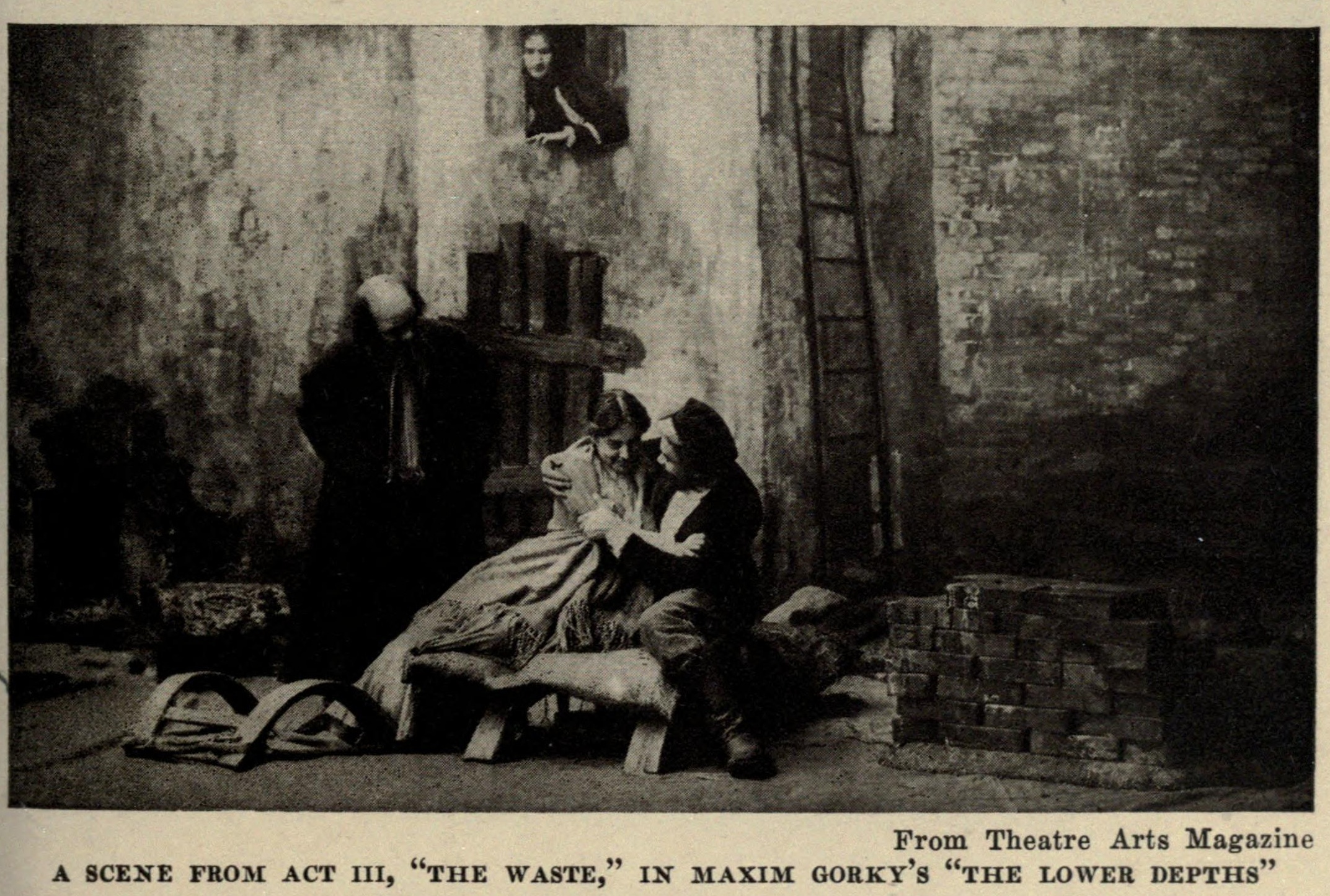

In the backyard that night, as Natasha is telling romantic stories to the crowd, Kostylyov comes out and orders her back to work. As she goes in, Vasilisa pours boiling water on Natasha's feet. Vaska attempts to rescue her and knocks Kostylyov down, and in the ensuing brawl Kostylyov is killed. Vasilisa immediately accuses Vaska of murder. Natasha thinks that Vaska has murdered Kostylyov for the sake of Vasilisa.

Sensing trouble, Luka disappears. Vaska escapes a police search, and Natasha is taken to the hospital, while the rest of the down-and-outers continue as before. Satin cheats at cards, and the Baron tries to convince the others of his former affluence. They all agree that Luka was a liar.

During a bitter quarrel with Nastya, the Baron steps outside. Satin and the others begin singing, but they break off when the Baron bursts in with the news of the actor's suicide, to which Satin retorts: "You spoiled the song, you idiot".

== Production history ==
The characters of The Lower Depths are said to have been inspired by the denizens of the Bugrov Homeless Shelter (Russian: Бугровская ночлежка, Bugrovskaya nochlezhka) in Nizhny Novgorod, which had been built in 1880–1883 by the Old Believer grain merchant and philanthropist Nikolai Alexandrovich Bugrov in memory of his father, A. P. Bugrov. When the actors of the Moscow Arts Theatre were preparing the play for its first run in 1902, Maxim Gorky supplied them with photographs of the Nizhny Novgorod underclass taken by the famous local photographer, Maxim Dmitriev, to help with the realism of the acting and costumes.

== Film versions ==
- 1921: Japanese film: Minoru Murata directed a silent film called Souls on the Road (Rojō no Reikon), based on this play.
- 1936: French film director Jean Renoir made a 1936 film of the same name as the play.
- 1946: Indian film producer-director Chetan Anand began his career as a film director with Neecha Nagar (Lowly City), which was a Hindi film adaptation in an Indian setting. Neecha Nagar won the Palme d'Or (Best Film Award, then known as the 'Grand Prix'), at the first Cannes Film Festival in 1946, becoming the first Indian independent film to get international recognition.
- 1947: The Chinese film Night Inn (夜店), by director Huang Zuolin, is based on Ke Ling's Chinese theatrical adaptation of The Lower Depths. The film stars Shanghai singer Zhou Xuan.
- 1952: The Moscow Art Theatre production of the play was filmed by Soviet director A. Frolov in conjunction with Mosfilm studio and released as a feature film in the USSR.
- 1957: Japanese film director Akira Kurosawa adapted the story into the film Donzoko (The Lower Depths), starring Toshiro Mifune, in which the characters have been moved to Edo period Japan.
- 1966: Finnish director Mikko Niskanen shot the play as a telefilm in Finnish but retained the original setting.

== Influences ==
Gorky's play has been recognized as an important influence on Eugene O'Neill's 1946 drama The Iceman Cometh. In the dog pound scene from the 1955 Disney animated film Lady and the Tramp, the incarcerated homeless Russian Wolfhound, Boris, quotes a passage from the play: "Miserable being must find more miserable being. Then is happy."

== See also ==
- "Creatures That Once Were Men"
