= Primitive socialist accumulation =

Counterpart to the process of the primitive accumulation of capital

Primitive socialist accumulation, sometimes referred to as the socialist accumulation, was a concept put forth in the early Soviet Union during the period of the New Economic Policy. It was developed as a counterpart to the process of the primitive accumulation of capital that took place during the early stages and development of capitalist economies. Because the Soviet economy was underdeveloped and largely agrarian in nature, the Soviet Union would have to be the agent of primitive capital accumulation to rapidly develop the economy. The concept was proposed originally as a means to industrialize the Russian economy through extracting surplus from the peasantry to finance the industrial sector.

== History ==
The major proponent and main theorist of the concept was Yevgeni Preobrazhensky, a Soviet economist. His 1921 lectures, From N.E.P. to Socialism and 1924 lectures The Fundamental Law of Socialist Accumulation provided the skeletal framework for what he would expand on in his 1926 work The New Economics. The concept was initially developed during Preobrazhensky's interaction with and analysis of the New Economic Policy. Its main principle is that the state sector of economy of the transitional period has to appropriate the peasant's surplus product to accumulate resources necessary for the growth of the industry. Preobrazhensky describes this process as "the exploitation of one system by the other." The goal of primitive socialist accumulation was for the state to eventually "achieve the level of present-day capitalist technique", to make possible the changing of the technical basis of the state economy, and "to organize labor scientifically."

Preobrazhensky aligned himself with the Left Opposition after his signage of the Declaration of the 46, and the theory of primitive socialist accumulation became the main economic platform of the Left Opposition; with Preobrazhensky becoming their foremost political theorist. His theory would come under fire from other Soviet economists at the time such as Bukharin.

While some have argued that Stalin would eventually implement primitive socialist accumulation as the economic policy of the USSR, Ernest Mandel, Marxist economist, challenged the view that Stalin implemented the policies of Trotsky with the same methods as he stated "Stalin is said to have put Trotsky's programme into practice, even if with a brutality Trotsky himself would not have approved". He further elaborated that the economic programme advocated by Trotsky and the Left Opposition "undoubtedly underwent many changes in the period 1923-35". Mandel also argued that the policies of the Left Opposition are distinguishable from the proposals of the United Opposition of 1926-7 and the alternative strategies developed by Trotsky in his later works such as "The Revolution Betrayed (1936) and "The Transitional Programme (1938)". It should also be noted that there was a fundamental difference between the forced industrialization practiced under Stalin and the theory as supported by Trotsky and Preobrazhensky. For example, both did not believe in the use of coercion, and did not believe in the utilization of forced expropriation or collectivization.

== Economic Research on Preobrazhensky's Work ==
In The New Economics (1926), Preobrazhensky advanced two verbal propositions, now called his first and second:

1. The state can increase capital accumulation by lowering agricultural prices relative to industrial prices.
2. Doing so would not reduce the welfare of industrial workers.

These ideas shaped the Soviet industrialization debate (see § History) and later influenced development economics. Using the phrase "price scissors" (the price of agricultural goods relative to industrial goods, a term that arose from their divergence in the Soviet Union in the 1920s), Preobrazhensky held that the state could raise accumulation by turning the scissors against the peasants without hurting industrial workers.

=== Sah–Stiglitz analysis ===
In a 1984 paper, Raaj Sah and Joseph Stiglitz showed mathematically that, within their model, the first proposition holds (the Sah–Stiglitz accumulation theorem) but the second does not (the Sah–Stiglitz welfare theorem).

Their model has two sectors, agriculture and industry, and a constraint on foreign trade that the economy cannot freely increase its exports. The state's instruments are the industrial wage and the relative price of agricultural goods, and peasants and industrial workers face the same prices. The state sets the industrial wage such that workers' demand for agricultural goods equals the agricultural surplus, which is agricultural output less the peasants' own consumption. Capital accumulation is industrial output less the industrial goods that peasants and workers consume. Sah and Stiglitz argued that the model captures Preobrazhensky's verbal analysis and matches earlier readings, for example, those of Avinash Dixit on the two-sector framing, Evsey Domar on the limited role of foreign trade, and Michael Lipton on a single relative price, with each good priced the same in both sectors.

=== Subsequent work ===
Researchers have since varied the Sah–Stiglitz model and instruments. Among other studies, Jean-Marie Baland showed that, with consumer rationing, whether each theorem holds depends on whether only peasants, or both peasants and industrial workers, are rationed. Åke Blomqvist showed that the welfare theorem fails if the state makes industrial workers pay more for agricultural goods than peasants receive, at least when the price gap is small. Michael Carter showed that the accumulation theorem fails if a lower industrial wage reduces workers' productivity enough, or if agricultural goods can be exported freely. John Knight showed that, even without rationing peasants, the welfare theorem fails if the state can freely set workers' rations of agricultural and industrial goods, or compel peasants to deliver agricultural goods. In a 1992 book, Sah and Stiglitz examined these and other variants, including labor mobility between sectors and urban and rural unemployment, not to test Preobrazhensky's propositions but to understand how agriculture and industry have interacted in different periods and places.

== See also ==
- Primitive accumulation of capital
- Capital accumulation
- Capitalism
- Economy of the Soviet Union
- Scissors Crisis
