= Ustanovka =

Russia social enterprise 1924-1938

Ustanovka (Russian: Установка, IPA: [ʊstɐˈnofkə]) was a Russian social enterprise set up in 1924 to provide training and consultancy for the Soviet workforce and to raise funds for the Central Institute of Labour (CIT). It was disbanded in 1938 with its organizer shot in 1939.

== Origins ==
Ustanovka was set up by Alexei Gastev, who was also the founder of the CIT, to provide training for the Soviet workforce. It was a development of the work of Frederick Taylor, Henry Gantt and Frank Gilbreth. It aimed to create a new type of employee: "We assert that to reform the contemporary production one must not only reform the organisational process, but also remake the contemporary human employee; we also believe that the best educator of the contemporary employee is the machine". Using highly detailed time and motion studies, each task was broken down into separate elements and then models were developed to integrate these into a rational approach to perform tasks.

With the revival of the Soviet economy in 1924-5, the industry of the Soviet Union experienced a severe shortage of skilled labour. With the foundation of Ustanovka as a joint stock company, the CIT had a trading arm to provide training and consultancy. Soon Ustanovka signed contracts with the People's Commissariat for Labour and the metalworkers union (in which Gastev had previously played a prominent role) to train 10,000 metal workers. By 1927 its assets were worth over 1,000,000 rubles and it had eight training bases across the Soviet Union. They had already trained 4,100 workers with the capacity to train up to 6,000 per year.
