= Aleksei Gastev =

Russian revolutionary, trade-union activist, writer and poet

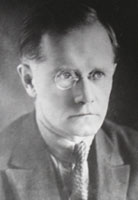
Aleksei Gastev

Aleksei Kapitonovich Gastev (Russian: Алексей Капитонович Гастев) (8 October 1882, Suzdal, Vladimir Governorate – 15 April 1939, Kommunarka, Moscow) was a Russian revolutionary, a pioneering theorist of the scientific management of labour in Soviet Russia, a trade-union activist, and an avant-garde writer and poet. His idea on labor management is one of the prototypes that Russian writer Yevgeny Zamyatin's novel We satirizes.

== Biography ==
=== Youth of a revolutionary ===
Aleksei Kapitonovich Gastev was born in the small central Russian town of Suzdal. He grew up in an idyllic neighbourhood with large cherry orchards a short distance from the centre of the town. The towns inhabitants were mostly artisans - cobblers, tailors, hatters, painters, etc. Gastev's father Kapiton Vasilevich Gastev was a teacher, a school headmaster and an inventor. Among other things, he invented an electrical apparatus for the treatment of rheumatic ailments. He died when Alexei was two years old. Gastev's mother, Ekaterina Nikolaevna, was a seamstress. Aleksei Gastev later described his childhood home as clean and cosy and furnished in the national Russian style.

In 1898 or 1899 Alexei Gastev entered the Moscow Teachers' College with the intention to become a teacher like his father. In 1900 he joined the Russian Social Democratic Labour Party. In 1902, just before final examinations, he was expelled from the college for being among the leaders of a student demonstration to commemorate the 40th anniversary of the death of Nikolay Dobrolyubov. From this time on he became a professional revolutionary and devoted himself to political activities mostly in the form of propaganda and agitation among the industrial workers. During this time, Gastev was closely associated with the Bolshevik faction of the party; he frequently corresponded with Vladimir Lenin and his wife, Krupskaya, on matters of party policy in 1903-1904 and reported to Lenin on the general strike in Ivanovo-Voznesensk in 1905.

As a result of his revolutionary activism, Gastev was arrested by the authorities and exiled to various parts of Northern and Eastern Russia in at least three separate incidents. He was nevertheless able to escape from his exiles each time, living illegally in Russia and usually managing to find his way abroad. In 1907, Gastev dissociated himself from the activities of the Bolshevik faction and officially left the party in 1908.

=== Industrial and trade-union work ===
From 1901 until 1917, Gastev's time was divided between exiles, escapes, and work in Russian or European factories. His experience as a factory worker led him to develop a rather practical approach to Marxism. Revolution for Gastev meant empowering workers by allowing them to control everyday matters related to work-processes. Gastev became involved in the work of the Petersburg Union of Metal Workers, one of the most influential trade-unions in Russia, in 1907. In 1908 he got work with the Vasileostrovskii Trolley Depot. Here he was chosen to monitor wear and tear on the transmission belts and sprockets and analyze the repair process of the trolley cars. It was here that he first thought of developing a "science for the social construction of enterprises".

In 1910, he was again arrested but when he was sent to Siberia, he escaped to Paris, where he worked for the motor-car manufacturer Clément-Bayard. Here he first became familiar with quality assurance which was carried out in a particularly thorough fashion. By 1912 he was working for Citroën where he witnessed the application of assembly line production which was inspired by the Ford plant in the United States. At that time, he became familiar with French Syndicalism and adopted many of its views, seeing trade unions as a chief means of confronting capitalism by bringing concrete improvements into the lives of workers. By 1913, Gastev had joined the Circle of Proletarian Culture, composed of revolutionary writers of Anatoly Lunacharsky, Fedor Kalinin, Pavel Bessalko and Mikhail Gerasimov. In 1917-1918, Gastev won election as the Chairman of the Central Committee of the newly created All-Russian Union of Metal Workers. He actively participated in the 1918 Conference of the Union.

=== Scientific management ===
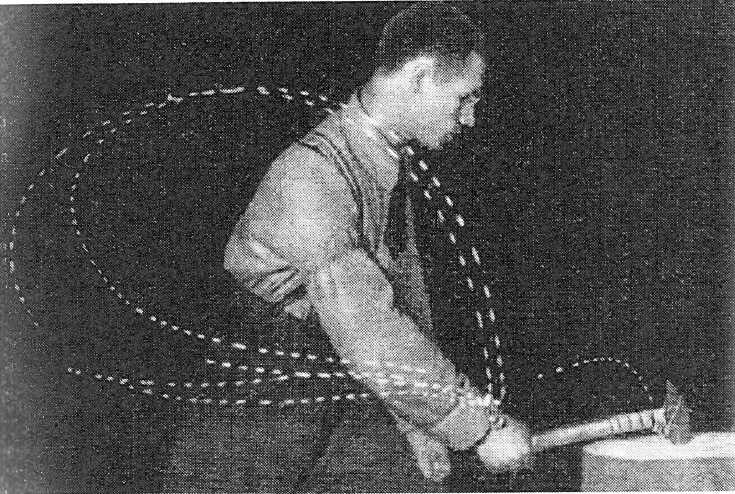
A cyclogram of Gastev cutting metal with a chisel and hammer

In 1920, Gastev became the founder and Director of the Central Institute of Labour (CIT) (Russian: ru:Центральный институт труда) in Moscow, which he referred to as his "last work of art". The institute was encouraged by Lenin, who promised to allocate the initial funding for the project. The institution developed scientific approaches to work management, which in practical terms amounted to methods of training workers to perform mechanical operations in the most efficient way. Simple repetitive operations (like the cutting of materials with a chisel) were studied in great detail, allowing for more efficient operations to be developed. According to Figes (1996), Gastev "As the head of the Central Institute of Labor, established in 1920, he carried out experiments to train the workers so that they would end up acting like machines. Hundreds of identically dressed trainees would be marched in columns to their benches, and orders would be given out by buzzes from machines. The workers were trained to hammer correctly by holding a hammer attached to and moved by a hammering machine so that after half an hour they had internalized its mechanical rhythm. The same process was repeated for chiseling, filing, and other basic skills. Gastev's aim, by his own admission, was to turn the worker into a sort of 'human robot' (a word, not coincidently, derived from the Slavic noun robota meaning work). Since Gastev saw machines as superior to human beings, he thought this would represent an improvement in humanity."

In 1921, in his article "Our Tasks" Alexei Gastev proposed a "social engineering" program based on the following principles of the scientific organization of labour in the socialist economy:

1. the decisive factor in the scientific organization of labour is the inclusion of a new type of worker into the technological process;
2. modern mass production requires turning each machine into a research laboratory, where "the search for everything new, rational, economical" takes place;
3. the work culture is determined by the "methodology of machine work with its analyticity, taking into account big numbers and standardisation."

Alexei Gastev understood "social engineering" as a scientific and practical method to solve the complex problem of the "machine-man" system that requires scientific experiment and rationalization. "In the social field, an era must come... of precise measurements, formulas, drawings, control gauges, social norms... we must pose the problem of complete mathematisation of psychophysiology and economics, so that we can operate with certain coefficients of arousal, mood, fatigue, on the one hand, straight and curved economic incentives, on the other".

However, unlike Frederick Taylor or Henry Ford, Alexei Gastev focused first of all on the human factor, making it the main idea of his seminal book "How to Work". He believed that people play the main role in the operation of an enterprise. The effectiveness of an organization begins with the personal effectiveness of each person in the workplace. Being himself both a worker and an intellectual, a representative of the so called proletarian intelligentsia, he tried to see things from the worker's perspective.

Platon Kerzhentsev criticized Gastev's Taylorist approach for adopting a "narrow base" by focusing on the worker rather than looking at the more general aspects of how production should be organized in a socialist society. In 1921 the Central Council of Scientific Organization of Labor (SOVNOT) was set up with both factions involved. In 1924 the All-Russian Scientific Management Conference was held in Moscow, where both Gastev and Kerzhentsev argued their case. The conference sided with Gastev, although Kerzhentsev argued that the CIT had wasted three years. From 1932 to 1936 he was the chairman of the All-Union Committee for Standardization (Gosstandart) under the Council of Labor and Defense, as well as the editor-in-chief of the journal Bulletin of Standardization.

=== Ustanovka ===
In 1928, in an effort to increase the funding of the CIT, Gastev organized the Ustanovka ("Setup") as a social enterprise (joint-stock company) which audited the work of industrial enterprises and provided recommendations on efficient organization of their work processes on a commercial basis. Here Gastev applied his ideas on education, based on his concept of "social engineering", meaning the creation of training methods based on the physiological and psychological study of humans in the work process, using both observational and experimental methods. This led to the creation of the "setup method" (установочный метод), which viewed the conditioning of human faculties as a basis for reform of the educational system in its entirety. The term "setup" (установка) implied the formation of personal automated behaviors through "biological setups", "cultural setups", etc. Gastev's methods were used in intensive trainings of qualified workers and were highly successful.

=== Poetry ===
Gastev's Poeziia rabochego udara, (Poetry of the worker's blow), was the first book published by Proletkult in 1918. Most of Gastev's poems may be fairly labeled prose poetry. The rhythm is usually not organized enough to qualify for verse, the rhyme is absent, the poems are written in the form of prose pieces. However, the use of metaphor, lyrical expressiveness, and repetitiveness of syntax undoubtedly make Gastev a true lyrical poet, with influences ranging from Émile Verhaeren and Walt Whitman to the Russian Futurists.

Gastev's poetry energetically celebrates industrialization, announcing an era of a new type of human, trained by the overall mechanization of everyday life. In the 1920s Gastev abandoned his literary work completely, dedicating himself to his scientific management research. However, many of his later publications on non-poetic topics are written in the expressive language of prose poems.

=== Arrest and death ===
On September 7, 1938, Gastev was arrested on false charges of "counter-revolutionary terrorist activity". He was detained in a Moscow prison and sentenced to death by a speedy trial by Military Collegium of the Supreme Court of the Soviet Union on April 14, 1939. There was no defense attorney and no possibility to appeal against the decision, as was common during the Great Purge. On April 15, 1939, Gastev was executed at Kommunarka shooting ground in the suburbs of Moscow.

=== Legacy ===
Gastev's legacy is commemorated by the Gastev's Cup by the "Lean Forum. Lean Production Professionals" Inter-Regional Public Movement. His son Yuri Gastev was a prominent Soviet mathematician and dissident who eventually emigrated to the USA. In 2019, an exhibition in the Na Shabalovke gallery in Moscow presented the work of Gastev. For the first time exhibits were presented that documented the different roles of Gastev as a theorist, writer, journalist, politician and founder of the CIL (Central Institute of Labor) (Manovich 2020).

== Works ==
1. Poeziya rabochego udara (Поэзия рабочего удара). Moscow. 1964, 1971.
2. Kak nado rabotat? (Как надо работать?). Moscow, Ekonomika. 1966, 1972.
3. Trudovye ustanovki (Трудовые установки). Moscow, Ekonomika. 1973.

== See also ==
- The Ghost of the Executed Engineer, primarily about the Russian engineer Peter Palchinsky (1875–1929)
- An American Engineer in Stalin's Russia: The Memoirs of Zara Witkin, 1932-1934.
- Alexander Dolgun (1926-1986) survivor of the Soviet Gulag who returned to his native United States.
- John H. Noble (1923–2007) American survivor of the Gulags
- Robert Robinson (engineer) (1907-1994) Jamaican-born toolmaker who initially worked in the US auto industry but spent 44 years in the Soviet Union (1930-1974).
- Thomas Sgovio (1916-1997) American artist, and former inmate of a Soviet GULAG camp in Kolyma
- Victor Herman (1915-1985) Jewish-American initially known as the 'Lindbergh of Russia', who then spent 18 years in the Gulags of Siberia.
