= Zrelishcha =

ЗРЕЛИЩА
- Editor: Lev Kolpakchi
- Circulation: 6,000
- First issue: May 1, 1922; 104 years ago
- Final issue: June 1, 1924
- Country: Russia
- Based in: Moscow

ZRELISHCHA (Russian: ЗРЕЛИЩА – Spectacles) was a Russian language Soviet illustrated weekly theatre journal. It was originallyublished in Moscow from May to August 1922 under the name "Hermitage" (Russian: "Эрмитаж") (15 editions); from August 1922 to June 1924 (89 editions) it was known as Zrelishch. The journal published a chronicle of cultural events in Moscow with a focus on theatre, dance, opera, circus and music-hall. The journal regularly featured critical reviews, correspondence and discussion on avant-garde cultural activities in the Soviet Union and abroad. Edited by theatre critic Lev Kolpakchi, the journal was associated with the work of V. Ardov, B. Bebutov, O. Brik, P. Markov, V. Meyerhold, S. Yutkevich, A. Fevralsky, B. Arvatov, S, Tretyakov, and others. Many writers of the journal published under pseudonyms. The journal editors expressed affiliation to the Left Front of the Arts (Russian:"Левый фронт искусств") and the journal served as forum for the discussion and critique of Constructivist theatre, Formalism and the methods of dialectical materialism. The journal's position in regards to revolutionary cultural production, as set out in one of the first issues, was the "study the material characteristics and methods for its organization, the creation of a science of art, the transformation of art into a scientifically-organized mode of production."

== Theater Listings ==
The journal featured listings of Moscow and Petrograd theaters and critical reviews of ongoing productions. Some theaters listed in the journal were:

- Meyerhold Theater (Russian: Государственный театр имени Вс. Мейерхольда)
- Revolution Theater (now Mayakovsky Theater) (Russian: Театр Революции)
- First Proletkult Work Theatre (Russian: Первый Рабочий театр Пролеткульта)
- Moscow State Jewish Theater (Russian: Московский Государственный Еврейский Театр)
- Bolshoi Theatre (Большой театр)
- Maly Theatre (Russian: Малый театр)
- Novui Teatre (Новый театр)
- The Moscow Art Theatre (or MAT) (Russian: Московский Художественный академический театр)
- Studios 1, 2, 3, 4 of Moscow Art Theatre (Студии МХАТ — театральные студии при Московском Художественном театре)
- Kamerny Theatre (Russian: Камерный театр)
- Komissarjevsky Theatre (Академический драматический театр имени В. Ф. Комиссаржевской)
- Vakhtangov State theatre (Госуда́рственный академи́ческий теа́тр имени Е. Б. Вахта́нгова)
- Moscow Operetta (Моско́вский госуда́рственный академи́ческий теа́тр опере́тты)

== Theater Criticism ==
The journal featured reviews of theater productions in Moscow by the editorial staff, guest critics and readers. Revolutionary Theatre performances, such as Mystery-Bouffe (1921, Russian: "Мистерия-буфф"), Le Cocu magnifique (1922, Russian: "Великодушный рогоносец"), Tarelkin's Death (1922, Russian: "Смерть Тарелкина") were both critiqued and praised in the journal on numerous occasions.

== Public Discussion ==
The journal served as a platform for discussions of the role of Left Front of the Arts (Russian:"Левый фронт искусств") in Soviet culture and society. Topics discussed in the journal included the role of stylization versus naturalism in actors' physical movement, role of spectacle, the grotesque aesthetic, intellectualism, Formalism, audience affect, proletarian content, divisions between art and life, children's theatre, populist forms, comparisons with European and American trends in culture. The journal welcomed letters from the readers, in particular those of proletarian background.

In and outside of the pages of the journal, the contributing writers played an active role in the discussion of the role of theatre in Moscow during NEP reforms and actively defended the development of the Left front against what they termed as rightist, conservative critique. In a preface to the 24th edition, the writer V. Mass discussed the determining relationship between revolutionary theatre and NEP policy, the state financier and official promoter of cultural reforms in the USSR. He stated that "we need to remember that today's art is an unavoidable reaction caused by the economic situation. We are experimenting and sharpening our weapons. Let our animosity towards today's art aid us in the creation of truly new forms, ready for the new objective reality." In the 22nd edition, the writer A. Fevralsky characterized the task of the Left front as one of careful study of the material and the effective use of dialectic materialism as a tool for the forging of the new Marxist science of art. A. Fevralsky stated that "in parallel to this task, we need to strengthen the propaganda of the materialist understanding of art: the unveiling of class essence contained not only in the subject, but in the formal element of art." The editors univocally condemned any "fetish of beauty" in art and were critical of bourgeois tendencies, unsubstantiated aesthetic, and spiritual escapism. "What kind of theatre does the proletariat need?", an article published in the 18th edition, reviewed the discussion in the forum of the same name held at the Central Proletarian Club by members of the Left front (with the participation of Arvatov, Pletnev, Gomza, O. Brik, Tretyakov and Chuzhak) and the so-called Marxist opposition, the followers of Plekhanov on 20 December 1922. The article reported on statements issued concerning correct and timely theatre as one that specifically activates the consciousness of the proletariat, and restated that the existent forms of theatre were not appropriate for the task. In the article, the speaker Arvatov argued that proletarian theatre ought to appropriate forms such as cabaret, circus, operetta and clown-show, then praising the work of V. Meyerhold for pioneering revolutionary worker's theatre. Despite the critique of the journal for its intellectualism, the left-wing writers of the journal were highly invested in developing mass forms of popular spectacle, such as the circus and dance. Boris. Arvatov, in an article titled "What is it about worker's theatre" argued for the need to develop an "agit-theatre," which would discourage from passive viewing and escapist illusion and which would activate real people. "Because of this task," Arvatov writes, "we have to use circus, cabaret and cinema."

For the duration of the journal's run (1922-1924), the members of the Left front were critiqued for their affiliation with Formalism. The critiques were published and engaged with in the pages of the journal. The basis of the critique in articles such as "A Spoon without Soup" was that the Left front, in an attempt the empty the art of psychological, subjective bourgeois content, was creating "empty and incomprehensible forms" that were accessible only to an intellectual audience. The members of the Left front understood art as necessarily formal, but also, were committed to destroying the bourgeois separation between art in life, and in effect, fought for an art that could represent new revolutionary life. The writer Vladimir Mass wrote a defense of the Left front against such accusations by stating that the form/content debate itself was regressive and that "goal-oriented expediency is the main question of new art." According to Mass, revolutionary art should either be utilitarian like constructivism or it should serve as a tool for the organization of social consciousness and be the crucial expression of new culture. "The search for new forms by the true artist is always the result of the need to express new content," he wrote.

Another frequent topic of the journal was the role of audience in theatre. In a letter to the journal, "Simple Truths. I am a viewer," a theatre-goer opposed the view that theatre should be a particular way and that there is a correct way for theatre to be experienced by the audience. "I don't need an accurate understanding of theatre, but simply form the experience of pleasure when viewing a spectacle." The writers of the journal held idealistic views about serving an audience of proletarian background. Among the discussion on the means of integration of the proletariat into revolutionary culture, was the conversation on the general discrimination against uneducated viewers from theatre, which had previously been reserved for the bourgeois audience. In "About polite and impolite audience," a writer narrated the conception of the working-class audience as being late and eating during the performance, and argued that to the contrary, true "vulgarity is the sister of riches."

== Vsevolod Meyerhold & GITIS ==
The journal was supportive of the work of Russian and Soviet theatre director Vsevolod Meyerhold. The 30th edition of the journal was dedicated to the celebration of 25 years of Meyehold's work in theatre. The writers of the journal praised Meyerhold's constant commitment to dialectic method and his intuitive awareness of revolutionary theatre that predated the 1917 Revolution. M. Beksin wrote that "Already in 1906(!) Meyerhold makes the following remarks: Natural theatre does not understand plastics, it inhibits actors from training their bodies, and, while making theatre schools, forgets that the base subject should be physical sport." Other articles, such as those by O. Brik and Mikhail Levidov reveal the general lack of support for Meyerhold in Moscow circles by praising him despite his failure. The article "Success to the Loser" stated Meyerhold as a true revolutionary, and that only "a loser is true to the revolution." Other articles examined his pedagogy and the development of new forms of communist theatre in his workshop.

The State Institute of Theatre Arts (GITIS, Russian:Государственный Институт Театральночо Искусства, ГИТИС ), was opened on September 17, 1922 with Meyerhold serving as creative director. The journal extensively promoted the workshops at GITIS, seeing GITIS as the first school of revolutionary theatre and a victory for the Left front. Meyerhold envisioned GITIS as a place for the scientific development of the human through physical exercise and the construction of new culture where science, art and work would be united. Meyerhold's interest in Taylorism influences his development of Biomechanics - the actor training technique, implemented at GITIS. Biomechanics was called "Taylorism on stage" and was favorably reviewed by the journal. In the inaugural season 1922–1923, 125 students were studying in GITIS and staged 136 performances in total. In a review, the journal stated that the performances were up to 70% sold out. The report also stated that the economic conditions of the theater troupe were difficult. In 1923 the theatre of GITIS became separate from the school and was called Meyerhold Theatre.

The writers of the journal defended Meyerhold from the critique he received from Lunacharsky, as part of a larger critique of Formalism at this time. In his article "On the theatre of red byt," reviewed in the journal, Lunacharsky discussed the importance of revolutionary content and heroism. In a discussion piece, V. Shershenevich stated that "art requires a formal solution. Without form there is no art, but there can be art without content. But that does not mean that content is impossible, unnecessary or evil." Meyerhold's theatre was accused of being stylized by Lunacharsky, where revolutionary theatre called for aesthetic realism. Shershenevich argued that Meyerhold's theatre pursued true realism. As socialist realism became the official aesthetic, Meyerhold, serving as theatre director, continued to oppose it. Meyerhold was arrested on June 20, 1939 and executed by a firing squad in 1940.

== Views On Western Art ==
Several editions of the journal are dedicated to the discussion and critique of Western trends in art. The method of dialectical materialism, developed in the journal, was used to evaluate the cultural activities in bourgeois countries. The 19th edition featured a review of the reception of "Leftist Russian theatre" in Europe and America. The reception was not favorable: "The orientation on the money-spending audience of Europe and on the European bourgeoisie is not successful. When the Left Russian theatre that will have the material opportunity to perform in front of the working masses of the West, we will be deserving of real, moral success." The timing of the article was concurrent to the exceptional success of state-sponsored First Russian Art Exhibition in Berlin in October 1922, which featured the work of both representative painting and the Left front.

An article titled "Berlin Today- from the Reflections and Meetings of Mayakovsky" narrated Mayakovsky's meetings with the Russian emigre writers in Germany. The article described Berlin as an "impoverished and ill city, waiting to be cured by the proletarian revolution." According to Mayakovsky, there were no interesting theaters in Germany and the general poor state of the arts was due to the expiration of formalist aesthetics without a social basis. With frequent mention of Charlie Chaplin, the pages of the journal offer much praise for the development of cinema in Hollywood. In "Art of the West", the critic Osip Brik praised American popular drama for its mass appeal and ability to create "tension, unpredictability and grotesque situations, comicality" and stated that the Soviet Union had a long way to catch up to the American level of creativity. In a discussion on dance in the West vis a vis by the bourgeois standard of morality, Osip Brik wrote that dance had been seen as vulgar due to its physicality. Contrary to the exile of dance to the stage, Brik argued that dance should be available to everyone and ought to be practiced by the proletariat as a sport after work. An interview with Stanislavsky, who was traveling in the United States and visited theatre productions in New York, was published in the 35/36 edition of the journal. Stanislavsky critiqued the appropriation of European theatre technique in American dramatic arts, stating the need to be inspired by American way of life. M. Gering, in a review that remarked on American jazz and the reception of Moscow theatre troupe in USA, wrote that Americans love theatre, but do not have real theatre: "Meyerhold today uses elements of almost American theatre, but he also knows what to do and what theatre is, which the Americans do not."

== Contributors ==
- Lev Kolpakchi
- Vsevolod Meyerhold
- Sergei Tretyakov
- Pingvin
- Ikar
- Riurik Rok
- M Beksin
- Nikolai Tarabukin
- Sergei Bugoslavsky
- Samuil Margolin
- Vadim Shershenevich
- Momus
- Mikhail Levidov
- Aksel Eggegrekht
- Aleksei Gan
- Aleksandr Fevralsky
