= Central Institute of Labour =

Soviet-Russian research institute

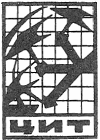
Центральный институт труда Logo

The Central Institute of Labour (CIT) (Russian: Центральный институт труда) was an organisation set up in Moscow for the study of work.

It was founded by Aleksei Gastev in 1920. Nikolai Bernstein was involved in scientific research there. It was located in a building of the Russian neoclassical revival at 24 Petrovka. CIT setup Ustanovka as a social enterprise which had a contract with the Commissariat of Labour.

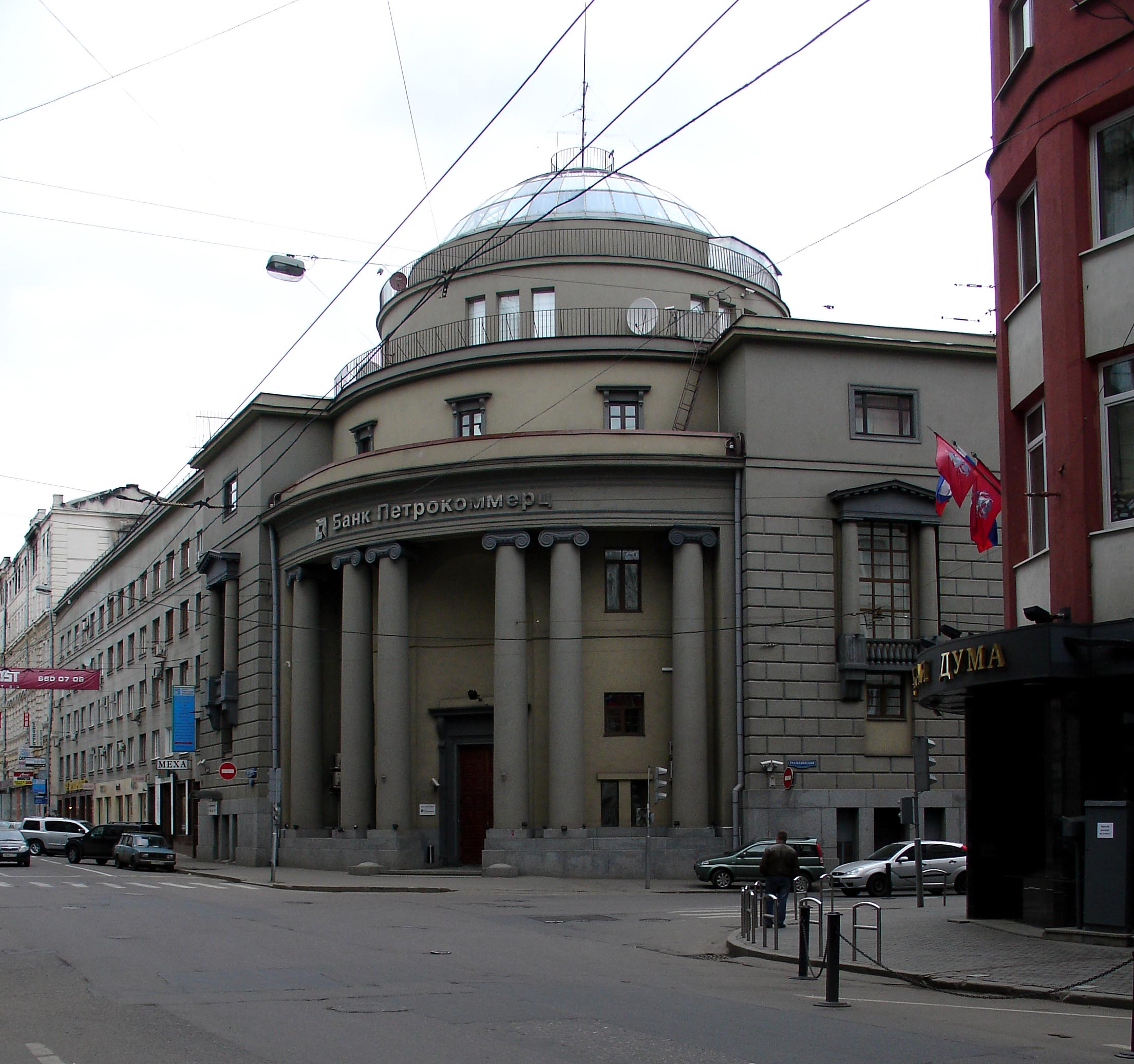
24 Petrovka

The theatre critic Ippolit Sokolov became involved with the institute when he set out to develop "industrial gymnastics" based on the Delsarte method.

Isaak Spilrein led a splinter group which did not accept Gastev's Taylorism, but rather embraced the psychotechnics of Harvard psychologist Hugo Münsterberg. Vygotsky described psychotechnics as "the scientific theory which would lead to the seizure and subordination of the mind, to the artificial control of behavior."

After Gastev's arrest in 1938 the CIT was transformed in Orgaviaprom.
