= Yuri Gastev =

Soviet mathematician (1928–1993)

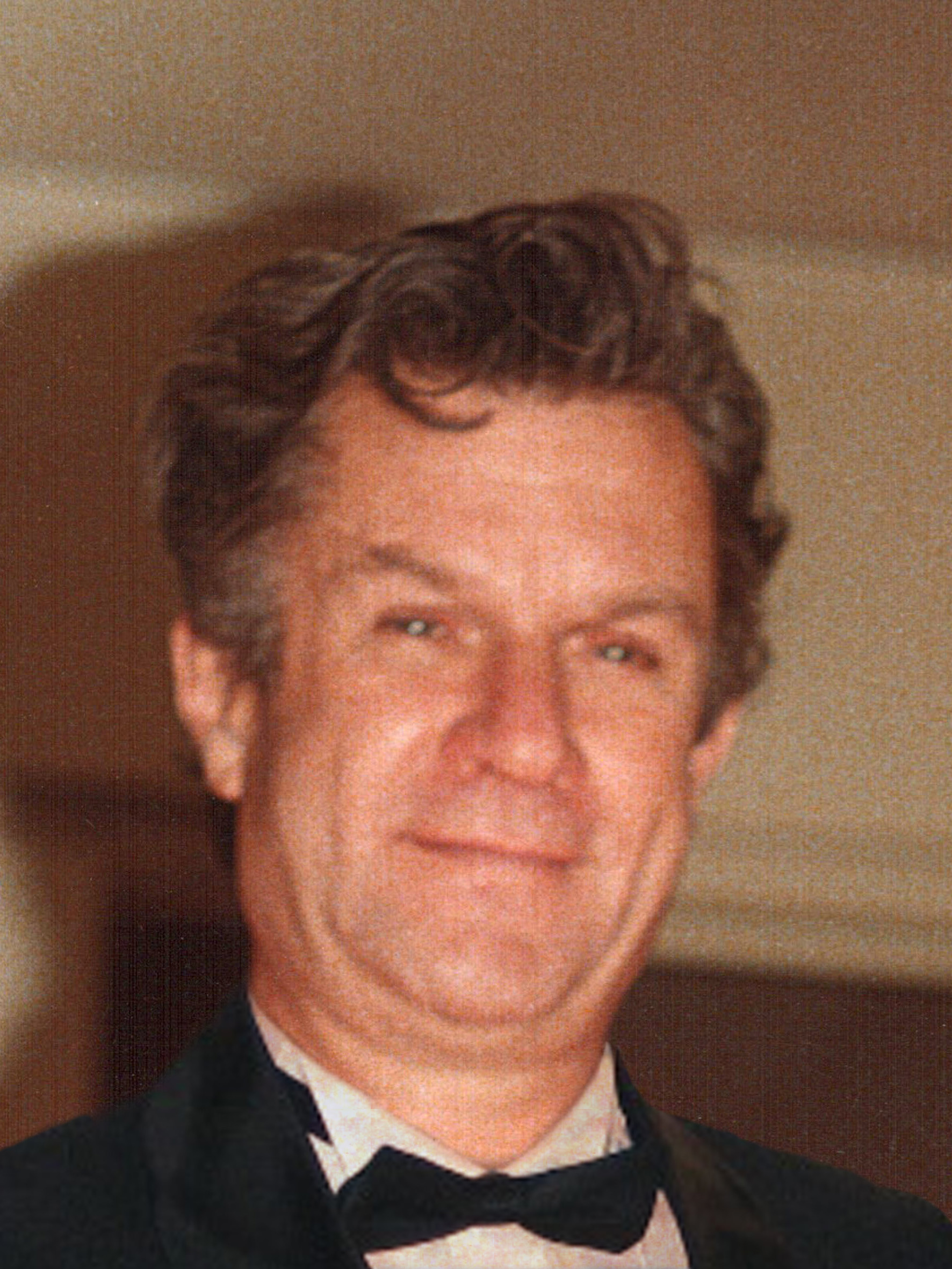
Yuri Gastev

Yuri Gastev (22 March 1928 in Moscow – 12 October 1993 in Boston) was a Soviet mathematician and cybernetician who became an active dissident, finally emigrating to the USA.

Yuri was the son of Aleksei Gastev, the revolutionary poet who later became an advocate of scientific management. Aleksei was arrested in 1938 as part of the Great Purge and murdered the following year. Yuri left school at 15 and started attending Moscow University. However two years later in 1945 he was arrested for anti-Soviet activity. Upon release he settled in Estonia working as a labourer and as a teacher.

At the time of Stalin's death in 1953 Gastev was in hospital. When it was announced on the radio that Stalin had fallen into Cheyne-Stokes breathing, another patient, being a doctor, recognised the significance of this and declared "Cheyne-Stokes is the end, time to get out the bottle". He included references to Cheyne-Stokes when defending his degree thesis, and added references to it in a book he wrote for the Soviet Cybernetics Council. This later cases was spotted leading to the editor being sacked. Gastev had already been sacked so no action was taken against him.

In 1981 he emigrated to France, then to the United States.

Gastev died of cancer in New England Deaconess Hospital on 12 October 1993.

== Works ==
- 1964 "Metatheory" with I. Shmain in Filosofskaya entsiklopediya, Vol. 3, Moscow pp. 400–402
