= Price scissors =

Economic Phenomenon

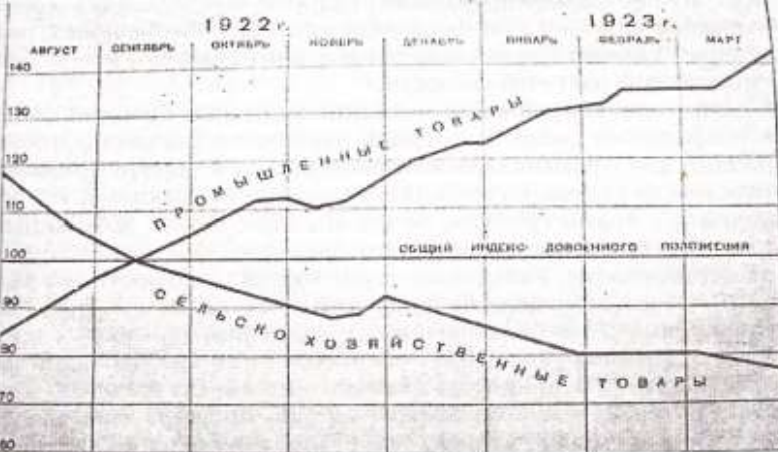
The most common example of price scissors is from the Soviet Union: agricultural prices continued to fall while industrial goods prices rose

"Price scissors" refers to an economic phenomenon when for a certain group or sector of productive population, the overall valuation from their production for sale outside this group drops below the valuation of the demand of this group for goods produced outside the group after a period of reasonable equilibrium. A typical example is when changing world price levels cause a country’s exports to plummet in value, while the valuation of its imports remains relatively stable.

This phenomenon draws its name from a graphical illustration of its effects over time. Plotting time on a horizontal axis against price level on a vertical axis, with agricultural prices and industrial prices shown in two separate curves, the graph should appear like a pair of opening scissors. Historically, the phenomenon has most frequently taken the form of falling prices for agricultural produce and steady prices for industrial goods. Thus, the price scissors are most devastating to countries that are net agricultural exporters and net industrial importers. Perhaps the most vivid illustration of the effects of the price scissors and its potential effects occurred in countries throughout Eastern Europe in the early 1930s. The phenomenon is not exclusively of international scale: early Soviet Union had industry/agriculture price scissors internally, see Scissors Crisis.

== History of global price scissors ==
=== Early 1930s: Crisis and response ===
The crash of the United States stock market in 1929 heralded the beginning of the Great Depression, but the crisis in Eastern Europe began in earnest with the collapse of the Creditanstalt in Vienna in 1931. In the ensuing worldwide panic, agricultural prices dropped severely, while prices for industrial goods remained relatively stable as governments imposed protectionist policies. Between 1929 and 1934, agricultural prices received in Romania dropped 56%, while industrial prices paid fell only 19%. Across the region, agricultural prices dropped an average of 34% over that period. Unsurprisingly, the opening of the price scissors was especially hard on peasants. As prices fell, peasants worked hard to increase their output of grain. Because of the highly inelastic demand for grain, however, this effort only further decreased prices and revenues, impoverishing peasants even more. Peasant incomes dropped by nearly 60% in Romania and Poland.

The sharp deterioration of the terms of trade caused by the price scissors was devastating to Eastern European governments as well. The heavy international borrowing of the 1920s now became a serious liability. The debts, accounted in nominal terms, became increasingly difficult to service as the value Eastern European governments received for their exports shrank to almost nothing. Worse, the response of the government to this cut in revenues was to increase taxes on the peasantry. As Aldcroft explains, “In [Bulgaria, Romania, and Yugoslavia] for example some 50 percent of the total cash income of the peasantry disappeared in taxation”.

Where the fragmentation of land reform had decreased agricultural efficiency, government response to the price scissors often exacerbated the problem. Any mechanization of agriculture would have meant an increase in rural unemployment, a move that, in combination with the dire conditions imposed by the Depression, would have been political suicide for any ruling regime. Thus, for example, Yugoslavia actually banned the use of tractors in the 1930s. Although keeping agriculture inefficient may have kept unemployment nominally lower, it did nothing to help ease the burden on the peasantry in the long run.

While policy responses such as taxing the peasantry and banning mechanization may seem counterproductive in hindsight, the price scissors had effectively tied the hands of the Eastern European governments, leaving them with few if any options. The revenue drought brought about by the decline in terms of trade meant that governments had very little money with which to implement effective policy responses. Faced with the choice of sacrificing the well-being of their peasantry or defaulting on their international debts, governments chose to pursue long-term solvency at the expense of their citizens. Even within such limitations, though, some of the region's governments were able to implement reasonably successful policies to aid their peasants. Romania declared a moratorium on debt payments in 1932, followed two years later by a decree that all debts would be reduced to half of their nominal value. As with a similar decree in Bulgaria, this Romanian policy gave some much-needed relief to the peasantry, which, like the government, was generally burdened with high levels of debt.

=== Political ramifications ===
The governments of Eastern Europe simply lacked the funds to mount an effective response to the price scissors. Their failure to do so had political ramifications that would eventually realign the entire region. The political problems began internally. In Bulgaria, the economic impotence of Andrei Liapchev’s government was a factor in the public disillusionment that led to the absence of serious resistance to the Zveno coup in 1934. Zveno prime minister Kimon Georgiev subsequently gave the government a more extensive role in the economy. In Hungary, economic hardships led to public protests in Budapest in 1931 (89). Soon after, the conservative right-wing government of Istvan Bethlen fell, to be replaced by the radical right-wing government of Gyula Gömbös.

Although the Depression was not as severe in relatively industrialized Czechoslovakia, the price scissors had disruptive political ramifications even there. The truth was that the Czech lands were far more industrialized than the Slovak, meaning that Slovaks suffered more heavily from the decline of agricultural prices than the Czechs. Worse, the Czechoslovak government raised protectionist barriers to shelter Czech industry, leading to a trade war with Hungary that was primarily damaging to Slovakia. The perceived indifference on Prague’s part deepened the rift between Czechs and Slovaks that would open wide at the outset of World War II.

Faced with few policy options and deteriorating political situations, the nations of Eastern Europe looked to the West for aid in fighting the price scissors. In 1930, the Yugoslav, Hungarian and Romanian governments joined together to request at the League of Nations that Western European countries buy Eastern European grain at preferential tariff rates—a move that would abrogate the Western nations’ obligations under most-favored-nation agreements (Kaiser 19). Although the Western nations had given nominal political support to the East, they failed to come through with material economic support. France, the military guarantor of the Little Entente, turned down the proposal. Britain likewise rejected the idea, in order to protect its largely agricultural Dominion protectorates. The refusal of Western governments to come to the assistance of Eastern Europe opened the door for Nazi Germany to gain power in the region. Unlike the Western powers, Germany quickly concluded agreements to buy Eastern European produce at preferential rates. In 1935, Gömbös concluded a treaty wherein Germany agreed to buy Hungarian agricultural goods, giving the country an economic boost but also strengthening pro-German sentiment. In 1939, Germany signed the Wohlstat Pact with Romania, promising German assistance in agricultural development in return for greater economic ties, which would give Germany access to Romanian oil reserves. The Nazi government concluded similar agreements in Yugoslavia and Bulgaria in the 1930s. In so doing, Germany effectively brought all of agricultural Eastern Europe into its economic orbit, gaining access to foodstuffs and raw materials while opening a dedicated market for its industrial goods.

This economic influence soon translated into political influence. Germany’s assistance did legitimately help the Eastern European economies out of the crisis brought by the opening of the price scissors, and public sentiment was therefore swayed in favor of the Reich. Here was Germany’s ulterior motive: as David Kaiser puts it, “the Foreign Office was determined to extend German influence in Southeastern Europe with or without any clear economic rationale”. German economic activities in Eastern (particularly Southeastern) Europe served as cover for the entry of Nazi infiltrators who spread propaganda and consolidated German political influence throughout the region. The onset of the price scissors in Eastern Europe, which began as a mere fluke of the international economic system, had played a heavy role in the disintegration and realignment of the Eastern European nations. The economic hardship brought about by the deterioration of the agricultural states’ terms of trade had paved the way for increasingly radical right-wing governments, shaken their faith in the commitment of the Western powers, and shaped the entire region into a cog in the Nazi war machine.

== See also ==
- Scissors Crisis
- Primitive socialist accumulation#Economic Research on Preobrazhensky's Work
