= Maxim Gorky =

Russian and Soviet writer (1868–1936)

- Максим Горький
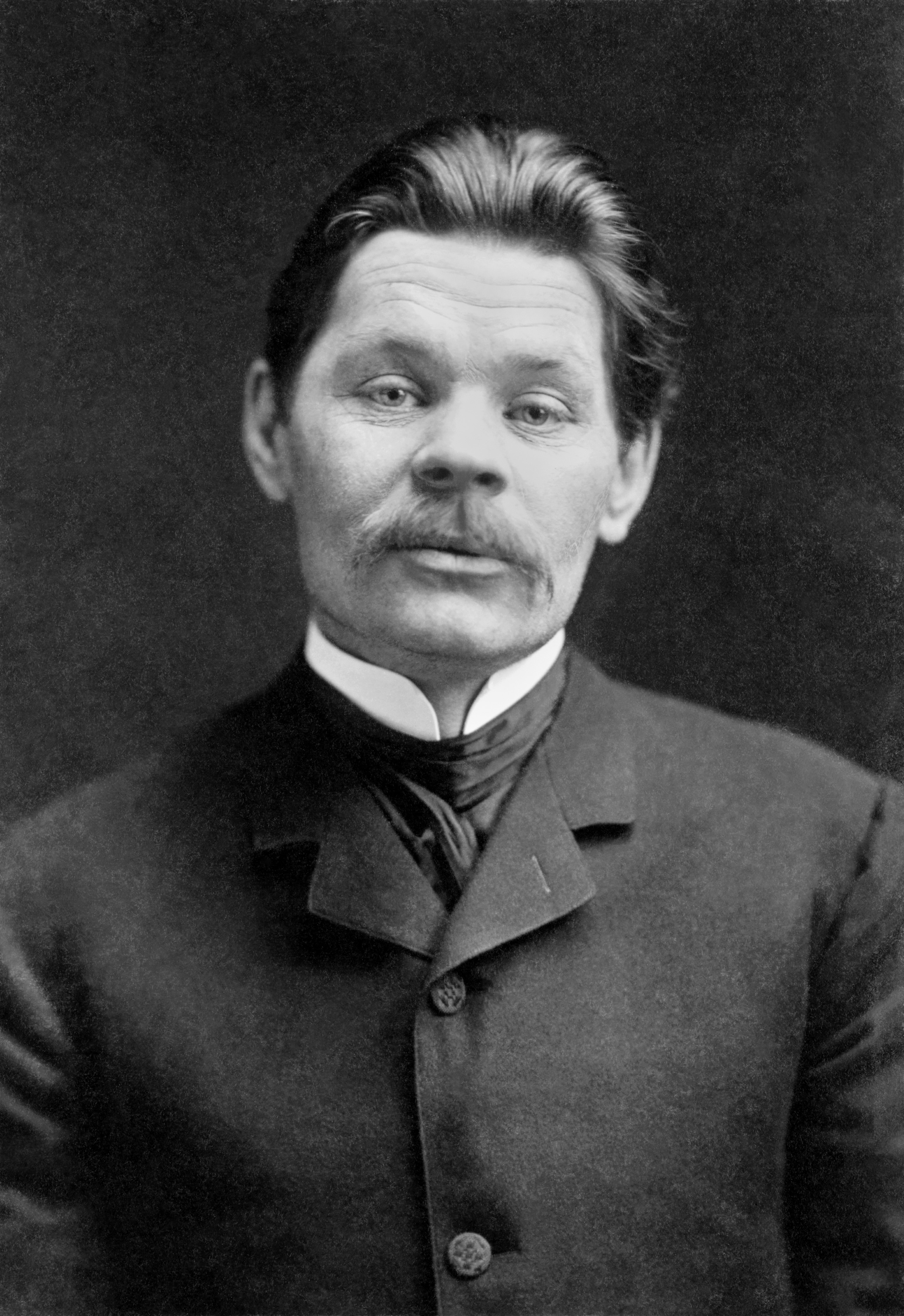
- Gorky in 1906
- Born: Alexei Maximovich Peshkov; 28 March 1868; Nizhny Novgorod, Russia
- Died: 18 June 1936 (aged 68); Gorki-10, Moscow Oblast, Soviet Union
- Resting place: Kremlin Wall Necropolis, Moscow
- Occupations: Writer; journalist; chief editor; publisher; political activist; philanthropist
- Spouse: Yekaterina Peshkova (m. 1896; sep. 1906)
- Writing career
- Pen name: Maxim Gorky
- Language: Russian
- Years active: 1892–1936
- Period: Modern
- Genres: Novel; novella; short story; sketch; fairy tale; fictional autobiography; travelogy; play; prose poem; long poem; opinion journalism; editorial; essay; satire; aphorism; memoir; diary; open letter; epistle; oration
- Notable works: The Lower Depths (1902); Mother (1906); My Childhood. In the World. My Universities (1913–1923); The Artamonov Business (1925); The Life of Klim Samgin (1925–1936)
- Notable awards: Griboyedov Prize (1903, 1904)
- Movements: Neo-romanticism (1890s); Proletarian literature (1900s); Social realism; Socialist realism (disputed); Modernism (1920s–1930s)
- Gorky's voice Recorded in 1934

Alexei Maximovich Peshkov (Note: In this name that follows East Slavic naming customs, the patronymic is Maximovich and the family name is Peshkov.) (Russian: Алексей Максимович Пешков; (Note: His own pronunciation, according to his autobiography Detstvo (Childhood), was [pʲˈeʃkʌ́vˈɛ], but most Russians say [pʲˈéʃkˈof], which is therefore found in reference books.) 28 March [O.S. 16 March] 1868 – 18 June 1936), popularly known as Maxim Gorky (/ˈɡɔːrki/; Максим Горький), was a Russian and Soviet writer, journalist, and proponent of socialism. He was nominated five times for the Nobel Prize in Literature. Before his success as an author, he travelled widely across the Russian Empire, changing jobs frequently; these experiences would later influence his writing. He associated with fellow Russian writers Leo Tolstoy and Anton Chekhov, both mentioned by Gorky in his memoirs.

Gorky was active in the emerging Marxist socialist movement and later supported the Bolsheviks. He publicly opposed the Tsarist regime and for a time closely associated himself with Vladimir Lenin and Alexander Bogdanov's Bolshevik wing of the Russian Social Democratic Labour Party. During World War I, Gorky supported pacifism and internationalism and anti-war protests. For a significant part of his life, he was exiled from Russia and later the Soviet Union, being critical both of Tsarism and of the Bolsheviks during the Russian Civil War and the 1920s, condemning the latter for political repressions. In 1928 he returned to the USSR on Joseph Stalin's personal invitation and lived there from 1932 until his death in June 1936. After his return he was officially declared the "founder of Socialist Realism". Despite this, Gorky's relations with the Soviet regime were rather difficult: while being Stalin's public supporter, he maintained friendships with Lev Kamenev and Nikolai Bukharin, the leaders of the anti-Stalin opposition executed after Gorky's death; he also hoped to ease the Soviet cultural policies and made some efforts to defend the writers who disobeyed them, which resulted in him spending his last days under unannounced house arrest.

Gorky's most famous works are his early short stories written in the 1890s marked by romanticism and Nietzscheanism (such as "Chelkash", "Old Izergil", and "Twenty-six Men and a Girl"), the play The Lower Depths (1902), his fictional autobiographical trilogy, My Childhood, In the World, My Universities (1913–1923), and the novel Mother (1906). Gorky regarded the latter as one of his biggest failures, and it received broad criticism in literary circles and from later scholars, yet, it remains one of his best-known books. However, there have been warmer appraisals of some of his lesser-known post-revolutionary works such as the novels The Artamonov Business (1925), said by some to be Gorky's finest novel, and The Life of Klim Samgin (1925–1936), which was Gorky's most ambitious project; the latter, although unfinished, is considered by some as Gorky's masterpiece and has been viewed by some critics as a modernist work. Unlike his pre-revolutionary writings (known for their "anti-psychologism") Gorky's later works differ, with an ambivalent portrayal of the Russian Revolution and interest in human psychology.

== Life ==
=== Early years ===
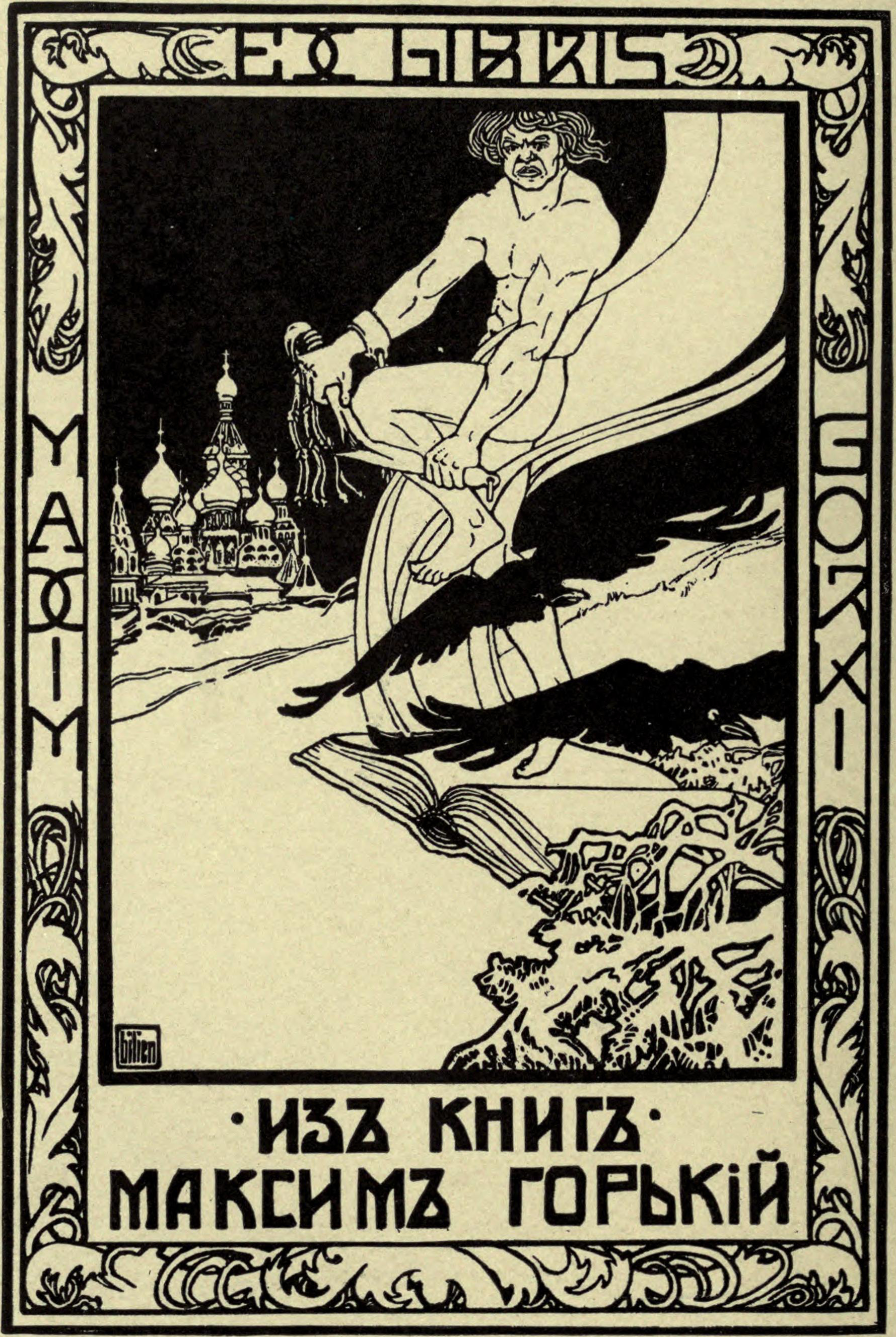
"Ex Libris Maxim Gorki" bookplate from his personal library depicts the unchained Prometheus rising from the pages of a book, breaking a multi-tailed whip and shooing away black crows. Saint Basil's Cathedral is portrayed in the background

Born as Alexei Maximovich Peshkov on 28 March [O.S. 16 March] 1868, in Nizhny Novgorod, Gorky became an orphan at the age of eleven. He was brought up by his maternal grandmother and ran away from home at the age of twelve in 1880. After an attempt at suicide in December 1887 he travelled on foot across the Russian Empire for five years, changing jobs and accumulating impressions used later in his writing.

As a journalist working for provincial newspapers, he wrote under the pseudonym Иегудиил Хламида (Jehudiel Khlamida). He started using the pseudonym "Gorky" (from горький; literally "bitter") in 1892, when his first short story, "Makar Chudra", was published by the newspaper Kavkaz (The Caucasus) in Tiflis where he spent several weeks doing menial jobs, mostly for the Caucasian Railway workshops. The name reflected his simmering anger about life in Russia and a determination to speak the bitter truth. Gorky's first book Очерки и рассказы (Essays and Stories) in 1898 enjoyed a sensational success and his career as a writer began. Gorky wrote incessantly, viewing literature less as an aesthetic practice (though he worked hard on style and form) than as a moral and political act that could change the world. He described the lives of people in the lowest strata and on the margins of society, revealing their hardships, humiliations, and brutalisation, but also their inner spark of humanity.

=== Political and literary development ===
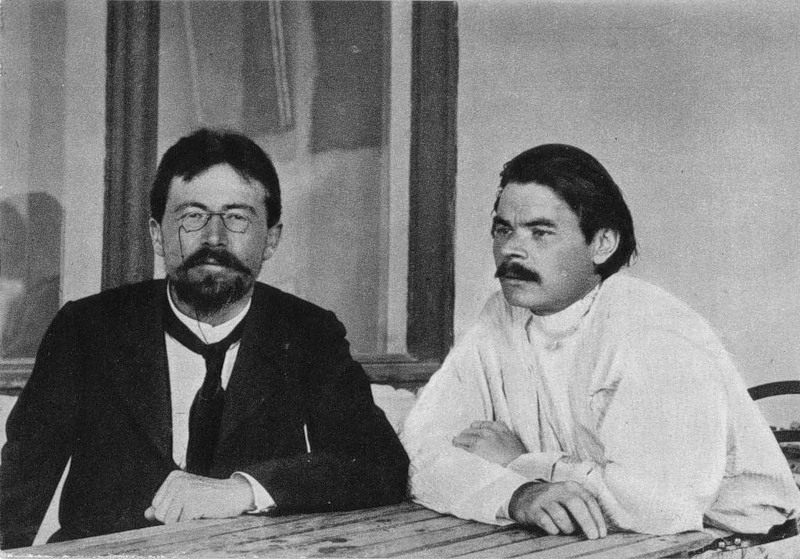
Anton Chekhov and Gorky. 1900, Yalta

Gorky's reputation grew as a unique literary voice from the bottom stratum of society and as a fervent advocate of Russia's social, political, and cultural transformation. By 1899, he was openly associating with the emerging Marxist social-democratic movement, which helped make him a celebrity among both the intelligentsia and the growing numbers of "conscious" workers. At the heart of all his work was a belief in the inherent worth and potential of the human person. In his writing, he counterposed individuals, aware of their natural dignity, and inspired by energy and will, with people who succumb to the degrading conditions of life around them. Both his writings and his letters reveal a "restless man" (a frequent self-description) struggling to resolve contradictory feelings of faith and scepticism, love of life and disgust at the vulgarity and pettiness of the human world.

In 1916, Gorky said that the teachings of the ancient Jewish sage Hillel the Elder deeply influenced his life: "In my early youth I read...the words of...Hillel, if I remember rightly: 'If thou art not for thyself, who will be for thee? But if thou art for thyself alone, wherefore art thou'? The inner meaning of these words impressed me with their profound wisdom...The thought ate its way deep into my soul, and I say now with conviction: Hillel's wisdom served as a strong staff on my road, which was neither even nor easy. I believe that Jewish wisdom is more all-human and universal than any other; and this not only because of its immemorial age...but because of the powerful humaneness that saturates it, because of its high estimate of man."

He publicly opposed the Tsarist regime and was arrested many times. Gorky befriended many revolutionaries and became a personal friend of Vladimir Lenin after they met in 1902. He exposed governmental control of the press (see Matvei Golovinski affair). In 1902, Gorky was elected an honorary Academician of Literature, but Tsar Nicholas II ordered this annulled. In protest, Anton Chekhov and Vladimir Korolenko left the academy.

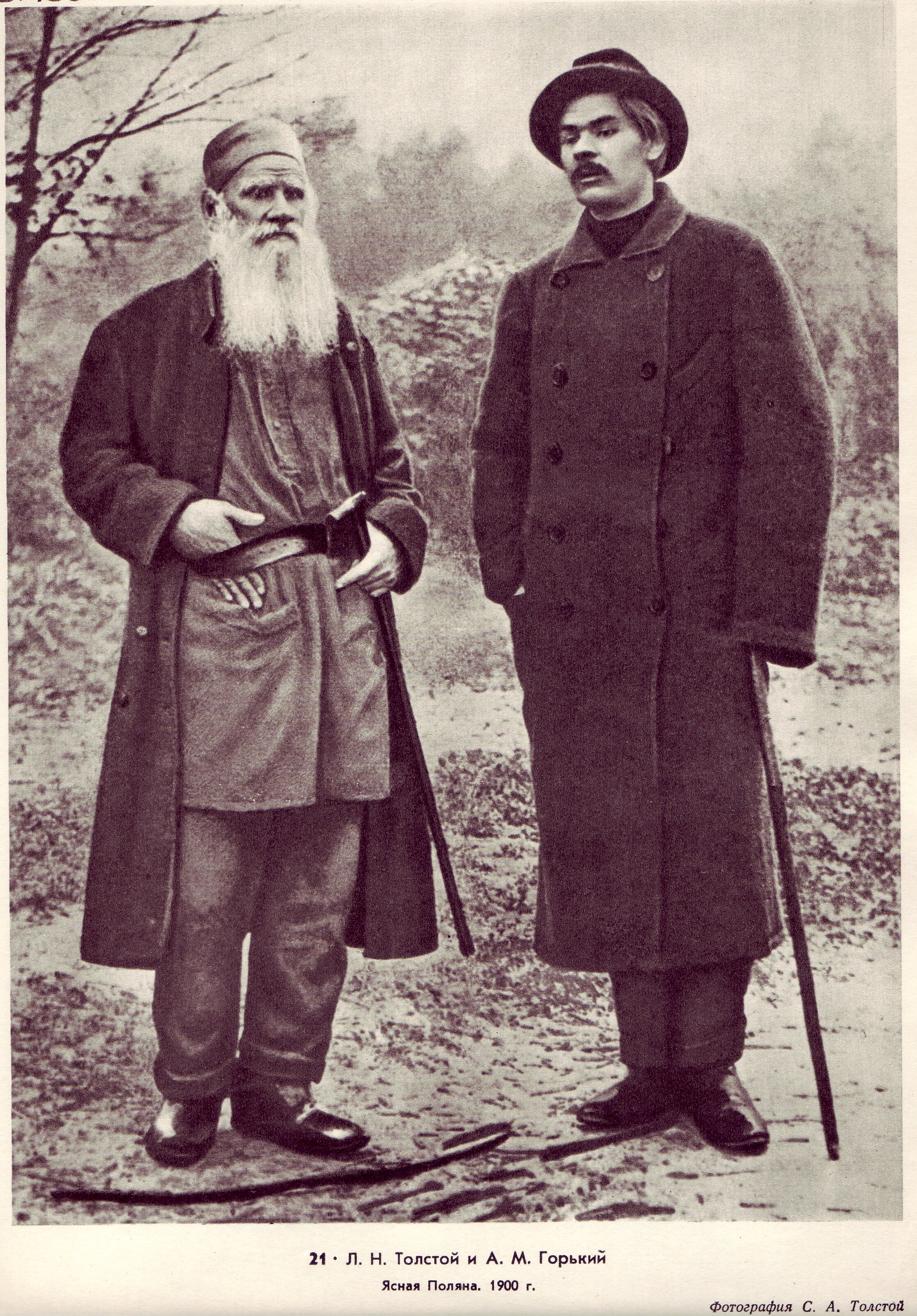
Leo Tolstoy with Gorky in Yasnaya Polyana, 1900

From 1900 to 1905, Gorky's writings became more optimistic. He became more involved in the opposition movement, for which he was again briefly imprisoned in 1901. In 1904, having severed his relationship with the Moscow Art Theatre in the wake of conflict with Vladimir Nemirovich-Danchenko, Gorky returned to Nizhny Novgorod to establish a theatre of his own. (Note: Vladimir Nemirovich-Danchenko had insulted Gorky with his critical assessment of Gorky's new play Summerfolk, which Nemirovich described as shapeless and formless raw material that lacked a plot. Despite Stanislavski's attempts to persuade him otherwise, in December 1904 Gorky refused permission for the MAT to produce his Enemies and declined "any kind of connection with the Art Theatre.") Both Konstantin Stanislavski and Savva Morozov provided financial support for the venture. Stanislavski believed that Gorky's theatre was an opportunity to develop the network of provincial theatres which he hoped would reform the art of the stage in Russia, a dream of his since the 1890s. He sent some pupils from the Art Theatre School—as well as Ioasaf Tikhomirov, who ran the school—to work there. By the autumn, however, after the censor had banned every play that the theatre proposed to stage, Gorky abandoned the project.

As a financially successful author, editor, and playwright, Gorky gave financial support to the Russian Social Democratic Labour Party (RSDLP), as well as supporting liberal appeals to the government for civil rights and social reform. The brutal shooting of workers marching to the Tsar with a petition for reform on 9 January 1905 (known as the "Bloody Sunday"), which set in motion the Revolution of 1905, seems to have pushed Gorky more decisively toward radical solutions. He became closely associated with Vladimir Lenin and Alexander Bogdanov's Bolshevik wing of the party, with Bogdanov taking responsibility for the transfer of funds from Gorky to Vpered. It is not clear whether he ever formally joined, and his relations with Lenin and the Bolsheviks would always be rocky. His most influential writings in these years were a series of plays on social and political themes, most famously The Lower Depths (1902). While briefly imprisoned in Peter and Paul Fortress during the abortive 1905 Russian Revolution, Gorky wrote the play Children of the Sun, nominally set during an 1862 cholera epidemic, but universally understood to relate to present-day events. He was released from the prison after a European-wide campaign, which was supported by Marie Curie, Auguste Rodin and Anatole France, amongst others.

In 1896, he met Zinovy Peshkov, who upon being baptized in 1902 adopted Gorky's last name, as Gorky was Peshkov's godfather.

Gorky assisted the Moscow uprising of 1905, and after its suppression his apartment was raided by the Black Hundreds. He subsequently fled to Lake Saimaa, Finland. In 1906, the Bolsheviks sent him on a fund-raising trip to the United States with Ivan Narodny. When visiting the Adirondack Mountains, Gorky wrote Mother, his probably most famous novel of revolutionary conversion and struggle; despite its success and political impact, various critics and Gorky himself were harsh of the book's value as of a work of art. His experiences in the United States—which included a scandal over his travelling with his lover (the actress Maria Andreyeva) rather than his wife—deepened his contempt for the "bourgeois soul".

=== Capri years ===
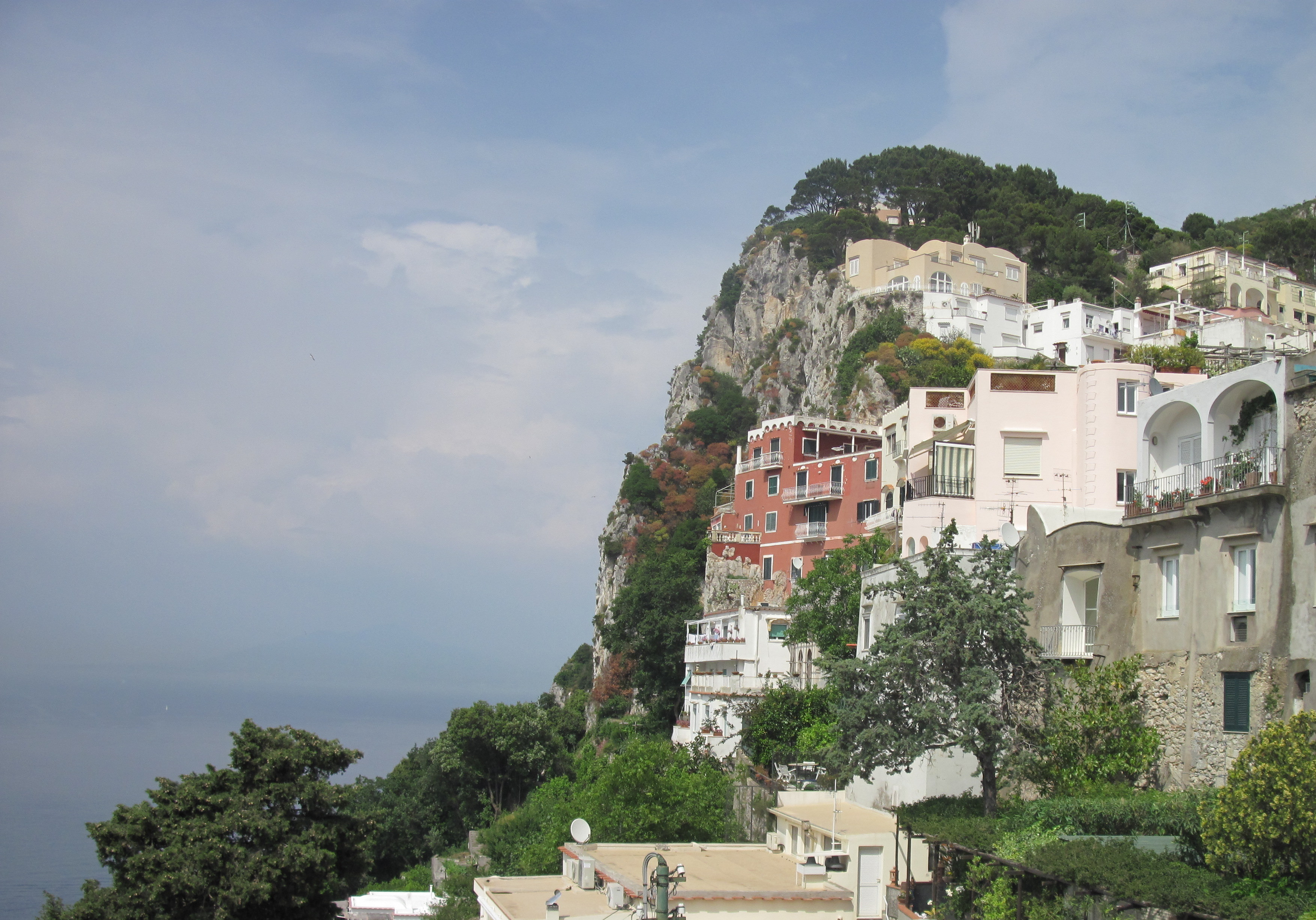
Between 1909–1911 Gorky lived on the island of Capri in the burgundy-coloured "Villa Behring".

From 1906 to 1913, Gorky lived on the island of Capri in southern Italy, partly for health reasons and partly to escape the increasingly repressive atmosphere in Russia. He continued to support the work of Russian social-democracy, especially the Bolsheviks and invited Anatoly Lunacharsky to stay with him on Capri. The two men had worked together on Literaturny Raspad which appeared in 1908. It was during this period that Gorky, along with Lunacharsky, Bogdanov and Vladimir Bazarov developed the idea of an Encyclopedia of Russian History as a socialist version of Diderot's Encyclopédie.

In 1906, Maxim Gorky visited New York City at the invitation of Mark Twain and other writers. An invitation to the White House by President Theodore Roosevelt was withdrawn after the New York World reported that the woman accompanying Gorky was not his wife. After this was revealed all of the hotels in Manhattan refused to house the couple, and they had to stay at an apartment in Staten Island.

During a visit to Switzerland, Gorky met Lenin, who he charged spent an inordinate amount of his time feuding with other revolutionaries, writing: "He looked awful. Even his tongue seemed to have turned grey". Despite his atheism, Gorky was not a materialist. Most controversially, he articulated, along with a few other maverick Bolsheviks, a philosophy he called "God-Building" (богостроительство, bogostroitel'stvo), which sought to recapture the power of myth for the revolution and to create religious atheism that placed collective humanity where God had been and was imbued with passion, wonderment, moral certainty, and the promise of deliverance from evil, suffering, and even death. Though 'God-Building' was ridiculed by Lenin, Gorky retained his belief that "culture"—the moral and spiritual awareness of the value and potential of the human self—would be more critical to the revolution's success than political or economic arrangements.

=== World War I and the Russian Revolution ===
An amnesty granted for the 300th anniversary of the Romanov dynasty allowed Gorky to return to Russia in 1914, where he continued his social criticism, mentored other writers from the common people, and wrote a series of important cultural memoirs, including the first part of his autobiography. On returning to Russia, he wrote that his main impression was that "everyone is so crushed and devoid of God's image." The only solution, he repeatedly declared, was "culture".

With Russia entering World War I in 1914 and the outburst of patriotism Gorky became devastated; shortly after the destruction of the Rheims Cathedral, Gorky wrote Andreeva: "All this is so terrible that I am unable to express even one one-hundredth of my heavy feelings, which are perhaps best described in words such as world catastrophe, the downfall of European culture." At first, Gorky along with the other writers signed a protest against the "barbarism of the Germans", blaming them for the war, "the despicable paper of the Russian liberals" in Lenin's words; later he wrote a series of anti-war publications, but succeeded in publishing only one of them, in which he appealed to feelings of international brotherhood and cooperation; one of the articles was confiscated by the censor, and another was condemned and led to the journal being confiscated after being published. While not being a strong "defeatist" like Lenin, Gorky supported "a speedy end of the war and for peace without annexation or indemnities." In 1915, he launched the publishing house Parus and the magazine Letopis to spread anti-war stance and "defend the idea of international culture against all manifestations of nationalism and imperialism"; among its prominent writers were the poets Sergei Yesenin, Aleksandr Blok and Vladimir Mayakovsky. Lenin was critical of Gorky's position: "In politics Gorky is always weak-willed and subject to emotions and moods." Gorky's best-known publication of the period were concerning antisemitism, written in response to the severe Tsarist repressions against the Jews, and an essay "Two Souls", which contrasted "the passive East" with "the active West" and promoted the values of European culture and progress and urged Russia to break free from the "Eastern-Asiatic" "soul" and encouraged the Russian bourgeoisie to participate "in the work of reform". Although the Okhrana, the secret police, had failed to find a legal pretext to close the journal, the government decided to do it in January 1917, but these plans failed because of the February Revolution. Gorky distrusted it at first, but in Spring became cautiously optimist about it. In Summer, Gorky's publishing house published one of Lenin's most famous writings, Imperialism, the Highest Stage of Capitalism, with Lenin's criticisms of Kautsky removed from the text.

After the February Revolution, Gorky visited the headquarters of the Okhrana on Kronversky Prospekt together with Nikolai Sukhanov and Vladimir Zenisinov. Gorky described the former Okhrana headquarters, where he sought literary inspiration, as derelict, with windows broken, and papers lying all over the floor. Having dinner with Sukhanov later the same day, Gorky grimly predicted that the revolution would end in "Asiatic savagery". Initially a supporter of the Socialist-Revolutionary Alexander Kerensky, Gorky switched over to the Bolsheviks after the Kornilov affair. In July 1917, Gorky wrote his own experiences of the Russian working class had been sufficient to dispel any "notions that Russian workers are the incarnation of spiritual beauty and kindness". Gorky admitted to feeling attracted to Bolshevism, but admitted to concerns about a creed that made the entire working class "sweet and reasonable – I had never known people who were really like this". Gorky wrote that he knew the poor, the "carpenters, stevedores, bricklayers", in a way that the intellectual Lenin never did, and he frankly distrusted them.

During World War I, his apartment in Petrograd was turned into a Bolshevik staff room, and his politics remained close to the Bolsheviks throughout the revolutionary period of 1917. Gorky was unperturbed by the October Revolution; in his diary he made a study of a gardener working the Alexander Park who had cleared snow during the February Revolution while ignoring the shots in the background, asked people during the July Days not to trample the grass and was now chopping off branches, leading Gorky to write that he was "stubborn as a mole, and apparently as blind as one too". Gorky's relations with the Bolsheviks became strained, however, after the October Revolution. One contemporary recalled how Gorky would turn "dark and black and grim" at the mere mention of Lenin. Gorky wrote that Vladimir Lenin together with Leon Trotsky "have become poisoned with the filthy venom of power", crushing the rights of the individual to achieve their revolutionary dreams. Gorky wrote that Lenin was a "cold-blooded trickster who spares neither the honor nor the life of the proletariat. ... He does not know the popular masses, he has not lived with them". Gorky went on to compare Lenin to a chemist experimenting in a laboratory with the only difference being the chemist experimented with inanimate matter to improve life while Lenin was experimenting on the "living flesh of Russia". A further strain on Gorky's relations with the Bolsheviks occurred when his newspaper Novaya Zhizn (New Life) fell prey to Bolshevik censorship during the ensuing civil war, around which time Gorky published a collection of essays critical of the Bolsheviks called Untimely Thoughts in 1918, which would not be republished in Russia until after the Perestroika. The essays call Lenin a tyrant for his senseless arrests and repression of free discourse, and an anarchist for his conspiratorial tactics; Gorky compares Lenin to both the Tsar and Nechayev.

"Lenin and his associates", Gorky wrote, "consider it possible to commit all kinds of crimes ... the abolition of free speech and senseless arrests."

He was a member of the Committee for the Struggle against Antisemitism within the Soviet government.

In 1921, he hired a secretary, Moura Budberg, who later became his mistress. In August 1921, the poet Nikolay Gumilev was arrested by the Petrograd Cheka for his monarchist views. There is a story that Gorky hurried to Moscow, obtained an order to release Gumilev from Lenin personally, but upon his return to Petrograd he found out that Gumilev had already been shot – but Nadezhda Mandelstam, a close friend of Gumilev's widow, Anna Akhmatova wrote that: "It is true that people asked him to intervene. ... Gorky had a strong dislike of Gumilev, but he nevertheless promised to do something. He could not keep his promise because the sentence of death was announced and carried out with unexpected haste, before Gorky had got round to doing anything." In October, Gorky returned to Italy on health grounds: he had tuberculosis.

In July 1921, Gorky published an appeal to the outside world, saying that millions of lives were menaced by crop failure. He also proposed the establishment of the Pomgol and joined the organization to relieve the famine. While most members of the organization were later arrested by the Soviet authorities for 'counterrevolutionary crimes', Gorky left Soviet Russia earlier and managed to avoid the arrest. The Russian famine of 1921–22, also known as Povolzhye famine, killed an estimated 5 million, primarily affecting the Volga and Ural River regions.

=== Second exile ===
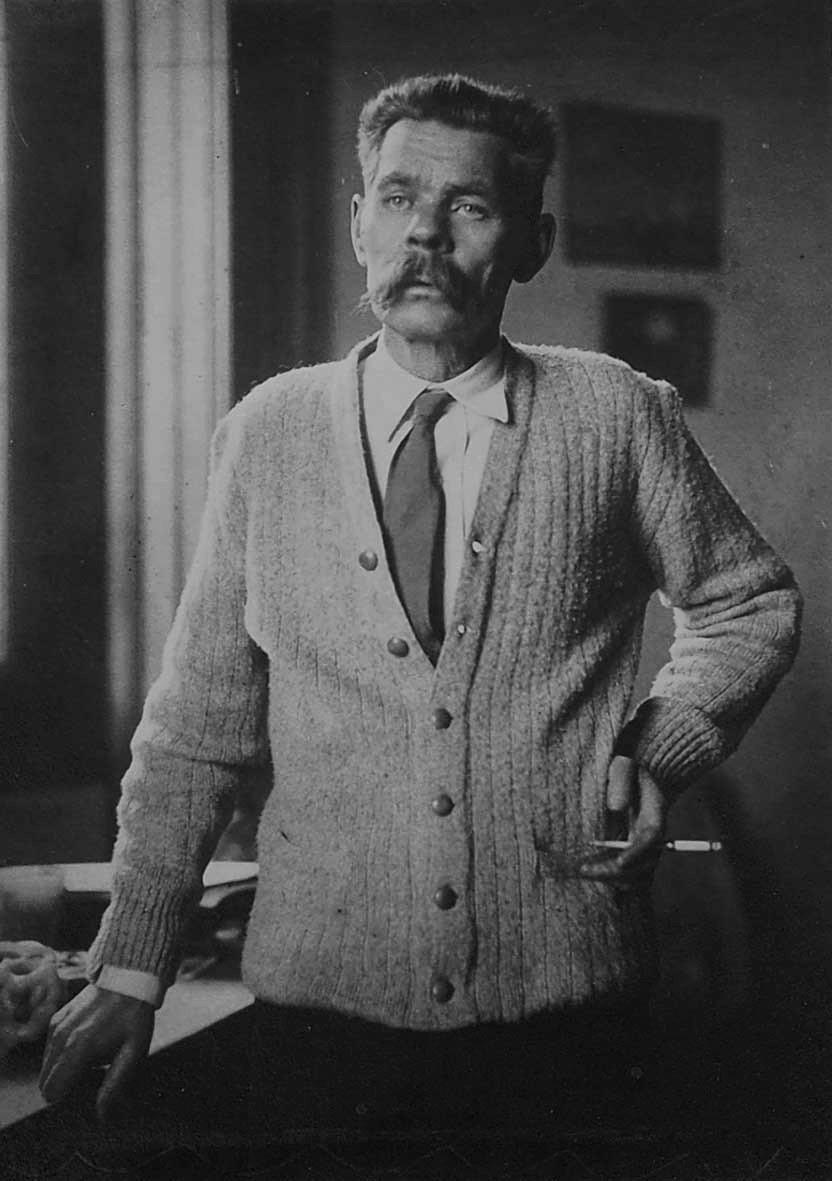
Gorky c. 1926

Gorky left Russia in September 1921, for Berlin. There he heard about the impending Moscow Trial of 12 Socialist Revolutionaries, which hardened his opposition to the Bolshevik regime. He wrote to Anatole France denouncing the trial as a "cynical and public preparation for the murder" of people who had fought for the freedom of the Russian people. He also wrote to the Soviet vice-premier, Alexei Rykov asking him to tell Leon Trotsky that any death sentences carried out on the defendants would be "premeditated and foul murder." This provoked a contemptuous reaction from Lenin, who described Gorky as "always supremely spineless in politics", and Trotsky, who dismissed Gorky as an "artist whom no-one takes seriously". He was denied permission by Italy's fascist government to return to Capri, but was permitted to settle in Sorrento, where he lived from 1922 to 1932, with an extended household that included Moura Budberg, his ex-wife Andreyeva, her lover, Pyotr Kryuchkov, who acted as Gorky's secretary for the remainder of his life, Gorky's son Max Peshkov, Max's wife, Timosha, and their two young daughters.

He wrote several successful books while there, but by 1928 he was having difficulty earning enough to keep his large household, and began to seek an accommodation with the communist regime. The General Secretary of the Communist Party Joseph Stalin was equally keen to entice Gorky back to the USSR. He paid his first visit in May 1928 – at the very time when the regime was staging its first show trial since 1922, the so-called Shakhty Trial of 53 engineers employed in the coal industry, one of whom, Pyotr Osadchy, had visited Gorky in Sorrento. In contrast to his attitude to the trial of the Socialist Revolutionaries, Gorky accepted without question that the engineers were guilty, and expressed regret that in the past he had intervened on behalf of professionals who were being persecuted by the regime. During the visit, he struck up friendships with Genrikh Yagoda (deputy head of the OGPU) who vested interest in spying on Gorky, and two other OGPU officers, Semyon Firin and Matvei Pogrebinsky, who held high office in the Gulag. Pogrebinsky was Gorky's guest in Sorrento for four weeks in 1930. The following year, Yagoda sent his brother-in-law, Leopold Averbakh to Sorrento, with instructions to induce Gorky to return to Russia permanently.

=== Return to Russia ===
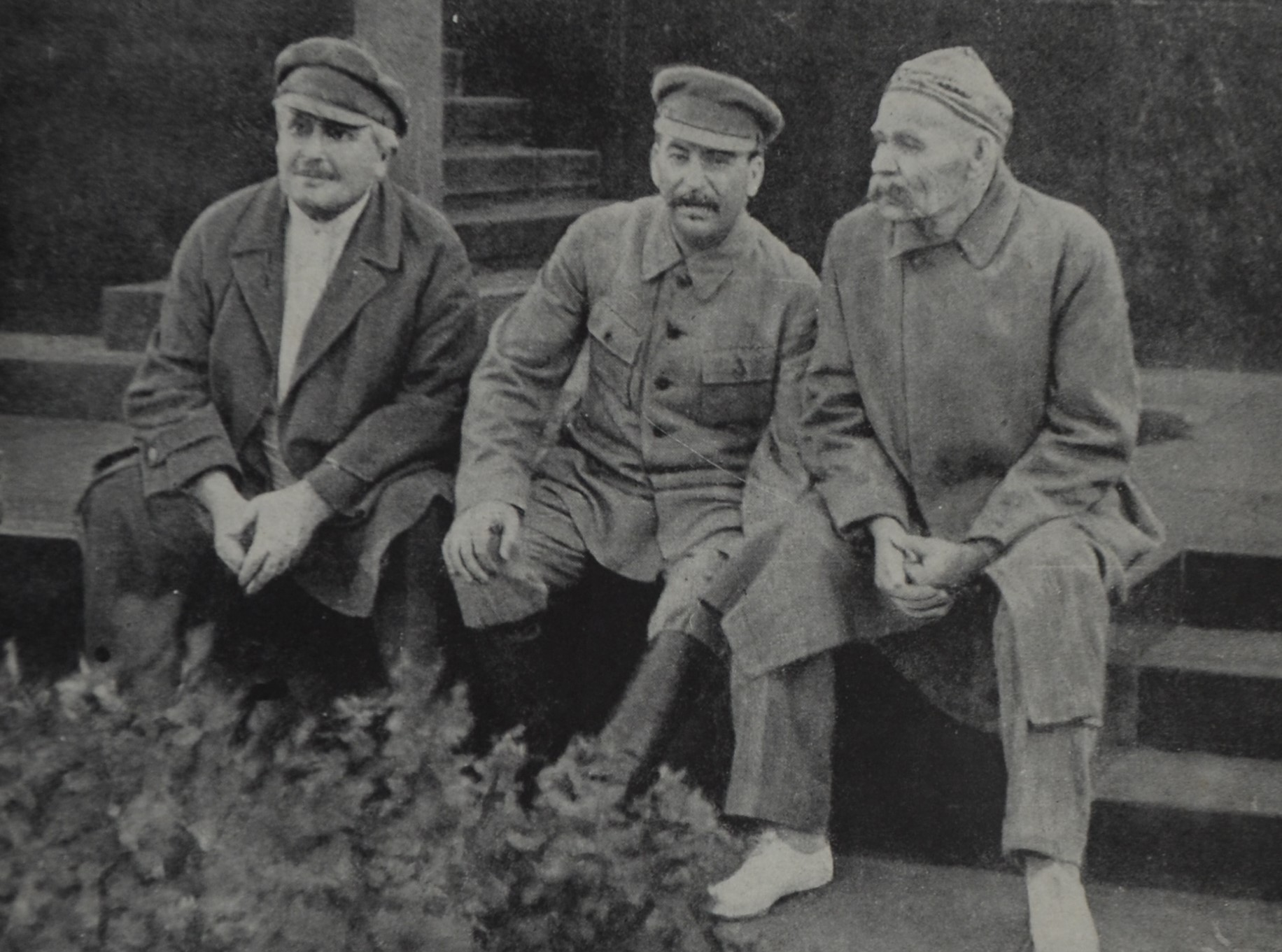
Avel Enukidze, Joseph Stalin and Maxim Gorky celebrate the 10th anniversary of Sportintern. Red Square, Moscow USSR. August 1931

Gorky's return from Fascist Italy (one of the first Western powers to officially recognize the Soviet government) was a major propaganda victory for the Soviets. He was decorated with the Order of Lenin and given a mansion (formerly belonging to the millionaire Pavel Ryabushinsky, which was for many years the Gorky Museum) in Moscow and a dacha in the suburbs. The city of Nizhny Novgorod, and the surrounding province were renamed Gorky. Moscow's main park, and one of the central Moscow streets, Tverskaya, were renamed in his honour, as was the Moscow Art Theatre. The largest fixed-wing aircraft in the world in the mid-1930s, the Tupolev ANT-20 was named Maxim Gorky in his honour.

He was also appointed President of the Union of Soviet Writers, founded in 1932, to coincide with his return to the USSR. On 11 October 1931 Gorky read his fairy tale poem "A Girl and Death" (which he wrote in 1892) to his visitors Joseph Stalin, Kliment Voroshilov and Vyacheslav Molotov, an event that was later depicted by Anatoly Yar-Kravchenko in his painting. On that same day Stalin left his autograph on the last page of this work by Gorky: "This piece is stronger than Goethe's Faust (love defeats death)". Voroshilov also left a "resolution": "I am illiterate, but I think that Comrade Stalin more than correctly defined the meaning of A. Gorky's poems. On my own behalf, I will say: I love M. Gorky as my and my class of writer, who correctly defined our forward movement."

As Vyacheslav Ivanov remembers, Gorky was very upset:

They wrote their resolution on his fairy tale "A Girl and Death". My father, who spoke about this episode with Gorky, insisted emphatically that Gorky was offended. Stalin and Voroshilov were drunk and fooling around.

=== Visits to Gulag camps ===
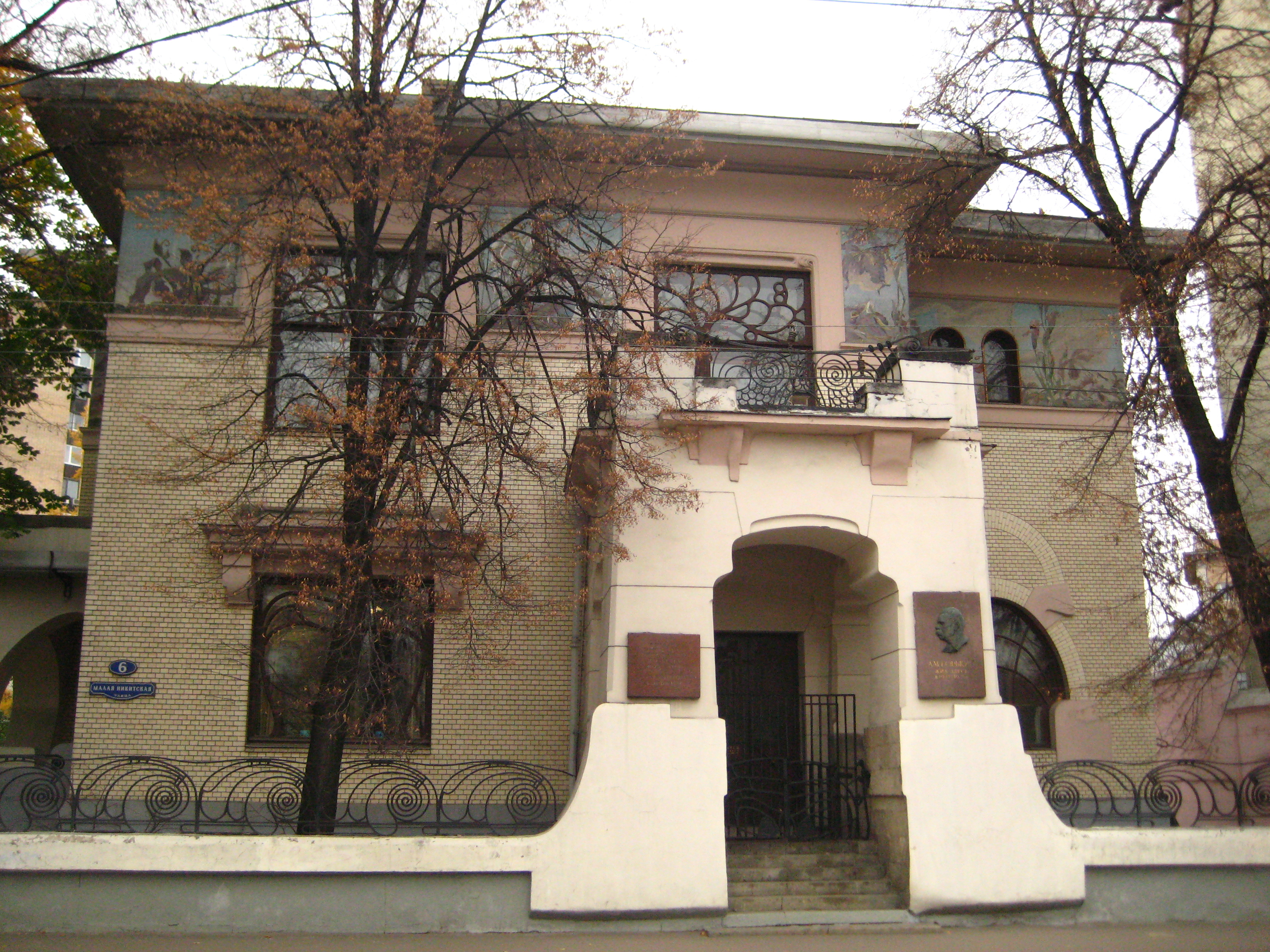
On his definitive return to the Soviet Union in 1932, Maxim Gorky received the Ryabushinsky Mansion, designed in 1900 by Fyodor Schechtel for the Ryabushinsky family. The mansion today houses a museum about Gorky.

In 1933, Gorky co-edited, with Averbakh and Firin, an infamous book about the White Sea–Baltic Canal, presented as an example of "successful rehabilitation of the former enemies of proletariat". For other writers, he urged that one obtained realism by extracting the basic idea from reality, but by adding the potential and desirable to it, one added romanticism with deep revolutionary potential. For himself, Gorky avoided realism. His denials that even a single prisoner died during the construction of the aforementioned canal was refuted by Aleksandr Solzhenitsyn who claimed thousands of prisoners froze to death not only in the evenings from the lack of adequate shelter and food, but even in the middle of the day. Most tellingly, Solzhenitsyn and Dmitry Likhachov document a visit, on 20 June 1929 to Solovki, the "original" forced labour camp (strictly the Solovetsky Islands), and the model upon which thousands of others were constructed. Given Gorky's reputation, (both to the authorities and to the prisoners), the camp was transformed from one where prisoners (Zeks) were worked to death to one befitting the official Soviet idea of "transformation through labour". Gorky did not notice the relocation of thousands of prisoners to ease the overcrowding, the new clothes on the prisoners (used to labouring in their underwear), or even the hiding of prisoners under tarpaulins, and the removal of the torture rooms. The deception was exposed when Gorky was presented with children "model prisoners", one of who challenged Gorky if he "wanted to know the truth". On the affirmative, the room was cleared and the 14-year-old boy recounted the truth – starvation, men worked to death, and of the pole torture, of using men instead of horses, of the summary executions, of rolling prisoners, bound to a heavy pole down stairs with hundreds of steps, of spending the night, in underwear, in the snow. Gorky never wrote about the boy, or even asked to take the boy with him. The boy was executed after Gorky left. Gorky left the room in tears, and wrote in the visitor book "I am not in a state of mind to express my impressions in just a few words. I wouldn't want, yes, and I would likewise be ashamed to permit myself the banal praise of the remarkable energy of people who, while remaining vigilant and tireless sentinels of the Revolution, are able, at the same time, to be remarkably bold creators of culture".

In a collection of academic papers about Gorky by the World Literature Institute of the Russian Academy of Sciences published in 1995 it was noted that the story about the boy was first told by Aleksandr Solzhenitsyn in The Gulag Archipelago and that there were never details given about the boy's identity, and that the story isn't supported by documents: "In the Solovki Museum... information about the real boy was not found; this story is considered by some to be a legend”. This historical ‘review’ however needs to be tempered against the first person narrative of Dmitry Likhachov who, unlike Solzhenitsyn, was at Solovki. Regardless, Gorky visited the camp and was either blindly or knowingly ignorant of the true purpose and conditions of the infamous gulag" Dmitry Bykov in his biography of Gorky wrote that whether or not did the boy exist, "mass consciousness is structured in such a way that the boy is needed, and it is no longer possible to erase him from Gorky's biography"; Gorky's biographer Pavel Basinsky makes a similar statement that such "legends" represent "the essence of reality", but if the boy existed, it would be impossible for Gorky to "take the boy with him" even with his reputation of a "great proletarian writer": for example, Gorky had to spend over 2 years to free Julia Danzas.

Most tellingly of all is Gorky’s description of his 3-day visit “There is no impression of life being over-regulated. No, there is no resemblance to a prison; instead it seems as if these rooms are inhabited by passengers rescued from a drowned ship.” And later “If any so-called cultured European society dared to conduct an experiment such as this colony,” he wrote, “and if this experiment yielded fruits as ours had, that country would blow all its trumpets and boast about its accomplishments.”

Gorky also helped other political prisoners (not without the influence of his wife, Yekaterina Peshkova). For example, because of Gorky's interference Mikhail Bakhtin's initial verdict (5 years of Solovki) was changed to 6 years of exile.

=== 1930s ===
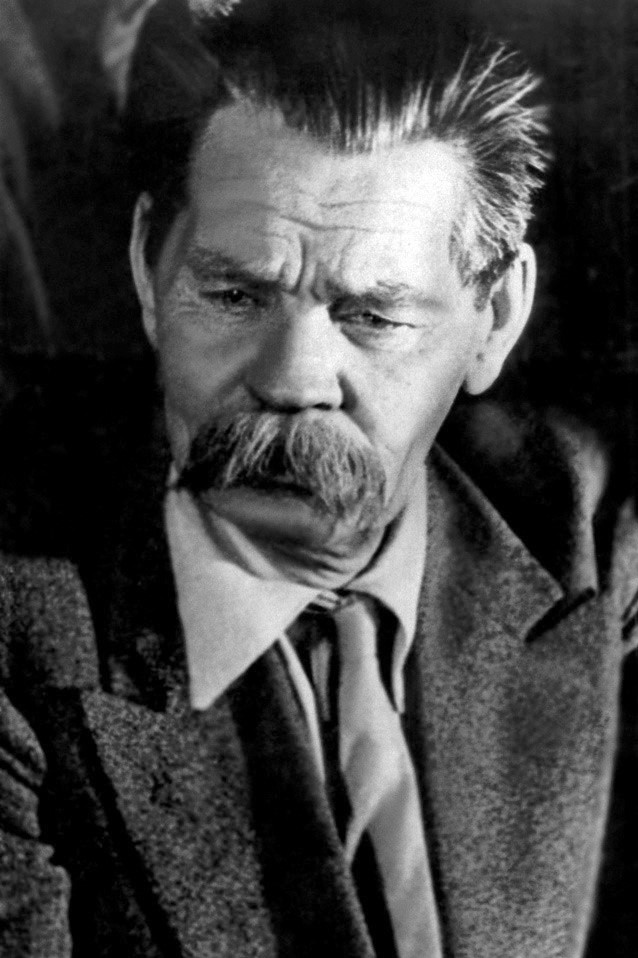
1930s portrait photo

During the 1930s, the relationship of Gorky with Stalin's regime became rather ambiguous: while Gorky publicly supported it, this period was marked by certain conflicts with the official policies.

Gorky was a strong and sincere supporter of such Stalinist policies as usage of forced labour, collectivization and "dekulakization" and the show trials against the saboteurs of the Plan, but being a propagandist for such policies wasn't his main role; he was regarded as an "ideological asset" to personify the myth of the "proletarian culture" and bring literature, as Tovah Yedlin writes, under the control of the party, becoming officially praised as "the founder of Socialist Realism in literature". More to it, Gorky strongly supported efforts in getting a law passed in 1934, making homosexuality a criminal offense, his attitude coloured by the fact that some members of the Nazi Sturmabteilung were homosexuals. The phrase "exterminate all homosexuals and fascism will vanish" is often attributed to him. In Pravda, he wrote: "There is already a sarcastic saying: Destroy homosexuality and fascism will disappear."

However, in her political biography of Gorky, Yedlin also describes his various conflicts with the official cultural policies and the increasing pressure on him towards the end of his life; during his last years, he supported friendly relations with Lev Kamenev and Nikolai Bukharin, the leaders of the opposition which were executed after Gorky's death, and he could be sympathetic to the centrist and Right Opposition in general; both Bukharin and Kamenev had been friends with Gorky since 1920s. Paola Cioni noted that although there are traits of a conflict in the relations between Stalin and the state and Gorky, it is uncertain when this conflict was provoked by psychological motives, and when it was provoked by his political position. It is certain, however, that Gorky intervened on behalf of such politically persecuted individuals as the historian Yevgeny Tarle and the literary critic, Mikhail Bakhtin, succeeded in making possible for the writers Yevgeny Zamyatin and Victor Serge to leave the country, tried to intercede on behalf of Karl Radek and Bukharin, and made Kamenev appointed as director of the publishing house Academia; Gorky also made efforts to support the literary "fellow travellers" and writers who had troubles with their works being published for ideological or artistic reasons or were disapproved by the official critic.

For example, in letters to Stalin he defended Mikhail Bulgakov, and partly because of Gorky, Bulgakov's plays The Cabal of Hypocrites and The Days of the Turbins were allowed for staging; Gorky took Andrei Platonov to the "writers' brigades" after he was made unable to be published because of his work critical of the collectivization, although Gorky rejected his "pessimistic" texts; with Gorky's intervention, Bukharin became one of the keynote speakers on the Writers' Congress and proclaimed Boris Pasternak, who was denounced by the Stalinist party critics as "decadent", to be "first poet" of the USSR. Gorky was not a supporter of artistic pluralism and diversity among writers and agreed that some censorship had to be inevitable, often being dismissive and rigid of creative experiments; however, Gorky was concerned with the bureaucratization of the Union of Writers and tried to oppose the increasing pressure on writers and attacked the party-sanctioned authors and them achieving the highest ranks in the literary bureaucracy. Such Stalin's closest associates as Lazar Kaganovich opposed Gorky and Bukharin in their efforts against the increasing party control of literature, and Kaganovich in his letters to Stalin wrote about Gorky's ideological faults and the ostensible influence of the Opposition on him. For example, Kaganovich and several Politburo members visited Gorky and demanded his keynote speech for the Congress of Writers to be rewritten, and in his account of the visit, Kaganovich reported that Gorky's "mood [was] apparently not very good", and that the "aftertaste" with which Gorky was critical about some life aspects in the USSR "reminded [him] of Comrade Krupskaya", Lenin's wife who supported the Right Opposition, and that Kamenev seemingly had "an important role in shaping" Gorky's "moods"; Kaganovich also proposed to heavily edit Gorky's attack on the members of the Organising Committee and publish it so it wouldn't circulate illegally. Another act which concerned the Politburo was Gorky's support of the members of the RAPP, the former party institution to control literature the members of which fell out of favour after its disbandment; Kaganovich wrote about Gorky supporting the RAPP-led campaign against Stalin's hand-picked leadership of the Organising Committee of the Union and demands to let Leopold Averbakh, the leader of RAPP who was executed in 1937, speak at the congress.

After his arrest in the beginning of 1935, Kamenev wrote a letter to Gorky: "We didn't talk with you about politics, and when I told you about the feeling of love and respect for Stalin..., about my readiness to sincerely work with him, that all feelings of resentment and anger burned out in me — I told the truth... I loved you from the bottom of my heart"; Gorky's secretary Kryuchkov didn't register the letter in Gorky's correspondence receipt book, but the hand-written copy in the Gorky archives contains the writer's characteristic annotations in red pencil; meanwhile, as Gorky's relationship with Stalin worsened, the latter stopped visiting him and replying to his phone calls, and their formal correspondence was almost entirely maintained by Gorky, with Stalin replying occasionally. Later Gorky tried to defend an issue of Dostoevsky's Demons which was prepared by Kamenev and came out after his arrest; the novel had a reputation of a "counter-revolutionary" work. As the conflict was becoming more visible, Gorky's political and literary positions became weaker. Fyodor Panferov, one of the party-sanctioned leaders of the Socialist Realism writers earlier attacked by Gorky, published an answer to him, in which he dismissed his line of criticizing the officially acclaimed Socialist Realism writers while supporting such ostensible enemies of Communism as D. S. Mirsky. David Zaslavsky published an ironic response to Gorky's article defending Demons, in which he accused Gorky in connivance in the formation of the "counter-revolutionary intelligentsia" and directly compared his "liberal position" with the ideological enemies, namely Kamenev and Zinoviev: "Next thing you know you'll be calling for publication of White Guard writers", as Korney Chukovsky summarized in his diary; Gorky's second answer to Zaslavsky was not published. During the officially organized campaign against the composer Dmitry Shostakovich, Gorky wrote a letter to Stalin in defense of the composer, demanding a "careful" treatment of him and calling his critics "a bunch of mediocre people, hack-workers" "attack[ing] Shostakovich in every possible way."

Such sources as Romain Rolland's diary demonstrate that because of Gorky's refusal to blindly obey the policies of Stalinism, he had lost the Party's goodwill and spent his last days under unannounced house arrest.

=== Death ===
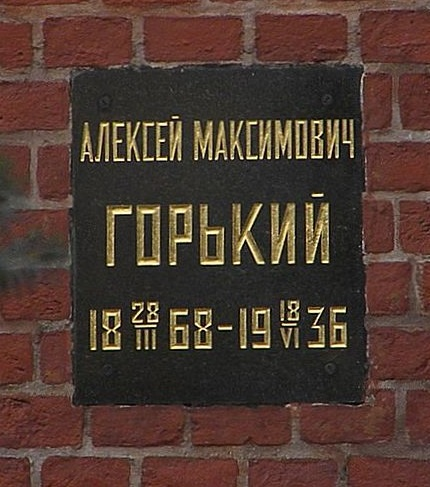
Grave of Maxim Gorky in the Kremlin Wall Necropolis

With the increase of Stalinist repression and especially after the assassination of Sergei Kirov in December 1934, Gorky was placed under unannounced house arrest in his house near Moscow in Gorki‑10 (the name of the place is a completely different word in Russian, unrelated to his surname). His long-serving secretary Pyotr Kryuchkov had been recruited by Yagoda as a paid informer. Before his death from a lingering illness in June 1936, Gorky was visited at home by Stalin, Yagoda, and other leading communists, and by Moura Budberg, who had chosen not to return to the USSR with him but was permitted to stay for his funeral.

The sudden death of Gorky's son Maxim Peshkov in May 1934 was followed, in June 1936, by the death of Gorky himself, officially from pneumonia. Speculation has long surrounded the circumstances of his death. Stalin and Molotov were among those who carried Gorky's urn during the funeral. During the Bukharin trial in 1938 (last of the three Moscow Trials), one of the charges was that Gorky was killed by Yagoda's NKVD agents.

According to several historians, Gorky and his son were poisoned by NKVD chief Genrikh Yagoda on orders from Stalin, possibly with the assistance of "Kremlin's doctors" Pletnyov and Lev Levin, using substances developed at a special NKVD laboratory in Moscow.

== Legacy ==
In the Soviet Union, the complexities in Gorky's life and outlook and literary work were reduced to an iconic image (echoed in heroic pictures and statues dotting the countryside): Gorky as a great Soviet writer who emerged from the common people, a loyal friend of the Bolsheviks, and the founder of the increasingly canonical "Socialist Realism". At the same time, such treatment of Gorky as a "state poet" and a Socialist Realism writer and his political career greatly compromised his reputation and his literary legacy, especially in the West: Aleksandr Solzhenitsyn later would call him "an apologist for executioners," although later scholars wrote about his contradictory relationship with the Bolsheviks and such points as his condemnation of the Red Terror and complicated relationships with Stalin (see above); the German scholar of Gorky Armin Knigge has concluded that Gorky "was never a Stalinist." In regards to his literary legacy, Knigge stated that Gorky is "not a classical writer like Fyodor Dostoevsky, but a representative of world literature" and a "rigorous observer on a level comparable to German writer Thomas Mann." In the West, out of his dramatical works, The Lower Depths (1902) has been the only play to retain a significant position in theatre, and only few of his early short stories had been influential; in the last years, some of Gorky's works written before the Revolution, like the play Children of the Sun (1905), and the early short stories, have been staged and republished. Richard Freeborn writes that although his reputation suffered because of his political career, "nowadays his achievement as the creator of many vivid portraits, as a brilliant memoirist and autobiographer and successor to Chekhov as a dramatist is undeniable." At the same time, even his best-known works, such as The Lower Depths and the novel Mother (1906) are hardly available in the West, and his other works, including the post-revolutionary novels The Artamonov Business (1925) and The Life of Klim Samgin which have received positive acclaim among critics (see below) have not been republished for a long time; according to Aaron Lake Smith (Lapham's Quarterly), "Gorky's work is so unavailable that it’s almost suspicious, as if there might still be a wizened Cold Warrior clanking away in a basement office somewhere in Washington..." In Russia, his figure is better known because of his former state-sponsored cult, but "his legacy has been overtaken by a kind of fog, widely depoliticized and misunderstood."

== Major works ==
=== Mother (1906) ===
Gorky's novel Mother, a story of a poor working woman overcoming the life of fear and ignorance in a Russian province and joining the revolutionary cause, is considered one of the most influential novels of the 20th century worldwide, and among Gorky's novels, it remains the best known work. It was written in 1906 in the United States with the goal to support the revolutionary mood of the Russian workers by conveying the political agenda among the readers through his work. Gorky himself was highly critical of the novel, saying that it was "an unsuccessful thing, not only in its external appearance, because it is long, boring and carelessly written, but chiefly because it is insufficiently democratic." The opinion of Gorky have been shared by various literary critics: for example, Marylin Minto notes that the portrayal of Nilovna, the main character of the novel, is very successful, but the other characters are one-dimensional. Richard Freeborn notes that the other characters are little more than "eloquent mouthpieces" of their points of view, yet, Gorky fixes the flaw by projecting them through Nilovna's apprehension of them. Despite its artistic flaws, it is still read by general public, and some contemporary reviewers have made favourable comments on it: The Spectator in 2016, on the occasion of a new translation of the novel being published, described it as "surprisingly topical" and containing such "eternal themes" as "awakening from a life of fear and ignorance."

=== My Childhood. In the World. My Universities (1915, 1916, 1923) ===
Gorky's trilogy of autobiographical prose works, My Childhood (1915), In the World (1916) and My Universities (1923) is regarded by contemporary critics and scholars as one of his major writings; according to Encyclopaedia Britannica, "considered to constitute one of the finest Russian autobiographies, the books reveal Gorky to be an acute observer of detail with great descriptive powers". Britannica writes that the trilogy "contains many messages, which Gorky now tended to imply rather than preach openly: protests against motiveless cruelty, continued emphasis on the importance of toughness and self-reliance, and musings on the value of hard work." The trilogy was praised by Gorky's contemporaries: D. S. Mirsky, for example, wrote that it made Gorky a "great realist." He also described the trilogy as "one of the strangest autobiographies ever written" for being "about everyone except himself [Gorky]. His person is only the pretext round which to gather a wonderful gallery of portraits."

=== The Artamonov Business (1925) ===
The novel The Artamonov Business (1925) has been regarded as one of Gorky's finest works of fiction: Irwin Weil has called the novel "perhaps Gorky's best single long work of fiction", while Richard Freeborn calls it Gorky's "best novel". Encyclopaedia Britannica calls The Artamonov Business "one of his [Gorky's] best novels". Geoffrey Grigson wrote that "it is like a less sophisticated Buddenbrooks": it is a chronicle of decline of a family of a pre-revolutionary industrialist family, from the beginning of 1860s to the Revolution of 1917.

=== The Life of Klim Samgin (1927–1936) ===
Gorky intended his final work of fiction, The Life of Klim Samgin, a novel which he worked on until his death, as his masterpiece; it was supposed to depict "all the classes, all the trends, all the tendencies, all the hell-like commotion of the last century, and all the storms of the 20th century." Out of the four intended volumes of the novel, Gorky finished only three which he published between 1927 and 1931; the final fourth volume was left unfinished and published only after his death in 1937. The novel follows the decadence of Russian intelligentsia from the start of the 1870s and the assassination of Alexander II to the 1917 Revolution, seen through the eyes of Klim Samgin, a typical petit-bourgeois intellectual.

The novel received controversial reputation among Gorky's contemporaries; among the ones who praised the work were the Russian poet and writer Boris Pasternak and the English poet Brian Howard. After Gorky's death, some critics and scholars have described it as a notable work of the 20th-century literature, unique in its laconic, experimental and eclectic style, which combines different cultural traditions and literary inventions, in its polyphony of an enormous amount of characters, "identity-seekers who create mirror images of each other"; some critics found it similar to such modernist masterpieces as Thomas Mann's The Magic Mountain (1924) and Robert Musil's The Man Without Qualities (1930–1943). Yet, despite the writings of critics, in the West the novel is "so unavailable that it's almost suspicious": it has never been reissued after being published in English in the 1930s.

== Bibliography ==
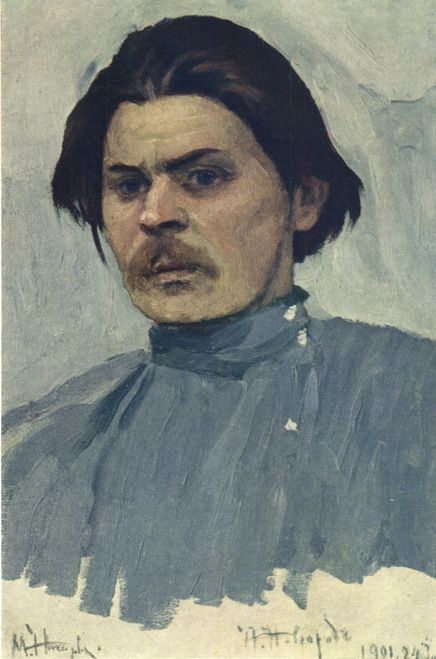
Portrait of Maxim Gorky by Mikhail Nesterov (1901)

Source: Turner, Lily; Strever, Mark (1946). Orphan Paul; A Bibliography and Chronology of Maxim Gorky. New York: Boni and Gaer. pp. 261–270.

=== Novels ===
- Goremyka Pavel, (Горемыка Павел, 1894). Published in English as Orphan Paul
- Foma Gordeyev (Фома Гордеев, 1899). Also translated as The Man Who Was Afraid
- Three of Them (Трое, 1900). Also translated as Three Men and The Three
- The Mother (Мать, 1906). First published in English, in 1906
- The Life of a Useless Man (Жизнь ненужного человека, 1908)
- A Confession (Исповедь, 1908)
- Gorodok Okurov (Городок Окуров, 1908), not translated
- The Life of Matvei Kozhemyakin (Жизнь Матвея Кожемякина, 1910)
- The Artamonov Business (Дело Артамоновых, 1925). Also translated as The Artamonovs and Decadence
- The Life of Klim Samgin (Жизнь Клима Самгина, 1925–1936). Published in English as Forty Years: The Life of Clim Samghin
  - Volume I. Bystander (1930)
  - Volume II. The Magnet (1931)
  - Volume III. Other Fires (1933)
  - Volume IV. The Specter (1938)

=== Novellas and short stories ===
- Sketches and Stories (Очерки и рассказы), 1899
  - Makar Chudra (Макар Чудра), 1892
  - Old Izergil (Старуха Изергиль), 1895
  - Chelkash (Челкаш), 1895
  - One Autumn Night (Однажды осенью), 1895
  - Konovalov (Коновалов), 1897
  - The Orlovs (Супруги Орловы), 1897
  - Creatures That Once Were Men (Бывшие люди), 1897
  - Malva (Мальва), 1897
  - Varenka Olesova (Варенька Олесова), 1898
  - Twenty-six Men and a Girl (Двадцать шесть и одна), 1899

=== Plays ===
- The Philistines (Мещане), translated also as The Smug Citizens and The Petty Bourgeois (Мещане), 1901
- The Lower Depths (На дне), 1902
- Summerfolk (Дачники), 1904
- Children of the Sun (Дети солнца), 1905
- Barbarians (Варвары), 1905
- Enemies, 1906.
- The Last Ones (Последние), 1908. Translated also as Our Father (Note: William Stancil's English translation, titled Our Father, was premiered by the Virginia Museum Theater in 1975, under the direction of Keith Fowler. Its New York debut was at the Manhattan Theater Club.)
- Reception (Встреча), 1910. Translated also as Children
- Queer People (Чудаки), 1910. Translated also as Eccentrics
- Vassa Zheleznova (Васса Железнова), 1910, 1935 (revised version)
- The Zykovs (Зыковы), 1913
- Counterfeit Money (Фальшивая монета), 1913
- The Old Man (Старик), 1915, Revised 1922, 1924. Translated also as The Judge
- Workaholic Slovotekov (Работяга Словотеков), 1920
- Egor Bulychev (Егор Булычов и другие), 1932
- Dostigayev and Others (Достигаев и другие), 1933

=== Non-fiction ===
- My Childhood. In the World. My Universities (1913–1923)
- Chaliapin, articles in Letopis, 1917 (Note: The manuscript of this work, which Gorky wrote using information supplied by his friend Chaliapin, was translated, together with supplementary correspondence of Gorky with Chaliapin and others.)
- My Recollections of Tolstoy, 1919
- Reminiscences of Tolstoy, Chekhov, and Andreyev, 1920–1928
- Fragments from My Diary (Заметки из дневника), 1924
- V.I. Lenin (В.И. Ленин), reminiscence, 1924–1931
- The I.V. Stalin White Sea – Baltic Sea Canal, 1934 (editor-in-chief)
- Literary Portraits [c.1935].

=== Essays ===
- O karamazovshchine (О карамазовщине, On Karamazovism/On Karamazovshchina), 1915, not translated
- Untimely Thoughts. Notes on Revolution and Culture (Несвоевременные мысли. Заметки о революции и культуре), 1918
- On the Russian Peasantry (О русском крестьянстве), 1922
- How I learnt to write

=== Poems ===
- "The Song of the Stormy Petrel" (Песня о Буревестнике), 1901
- "Song of a Falcon" (Песня о Соколе), 1902. Also referred to as a short story

=== Autobiography ===
- My Childhood (Детство), Part I, 1913–1914
- In the World (В людях), Part II, 1916
- My Universities (Мои университеты), Part III, 1923

=== Collections ===
- Sketches and Stories, three volumes, 1898–1899
- Creatures That Once Were Men, stories in English translation (1905). This contained an introduction by G. K. Chesterton The Russian title, Бывшие люди (literally "Former people") gained popularity as an expression in reference to people who severely dropped in their social status
- Tales of Italy (Сказки об Италии), 1911–1913
- Through Russia (По Руси), 1923
- Stories 1922–1924 (Рассказы 1922–1924 годов), 1925

== Commemoration ==
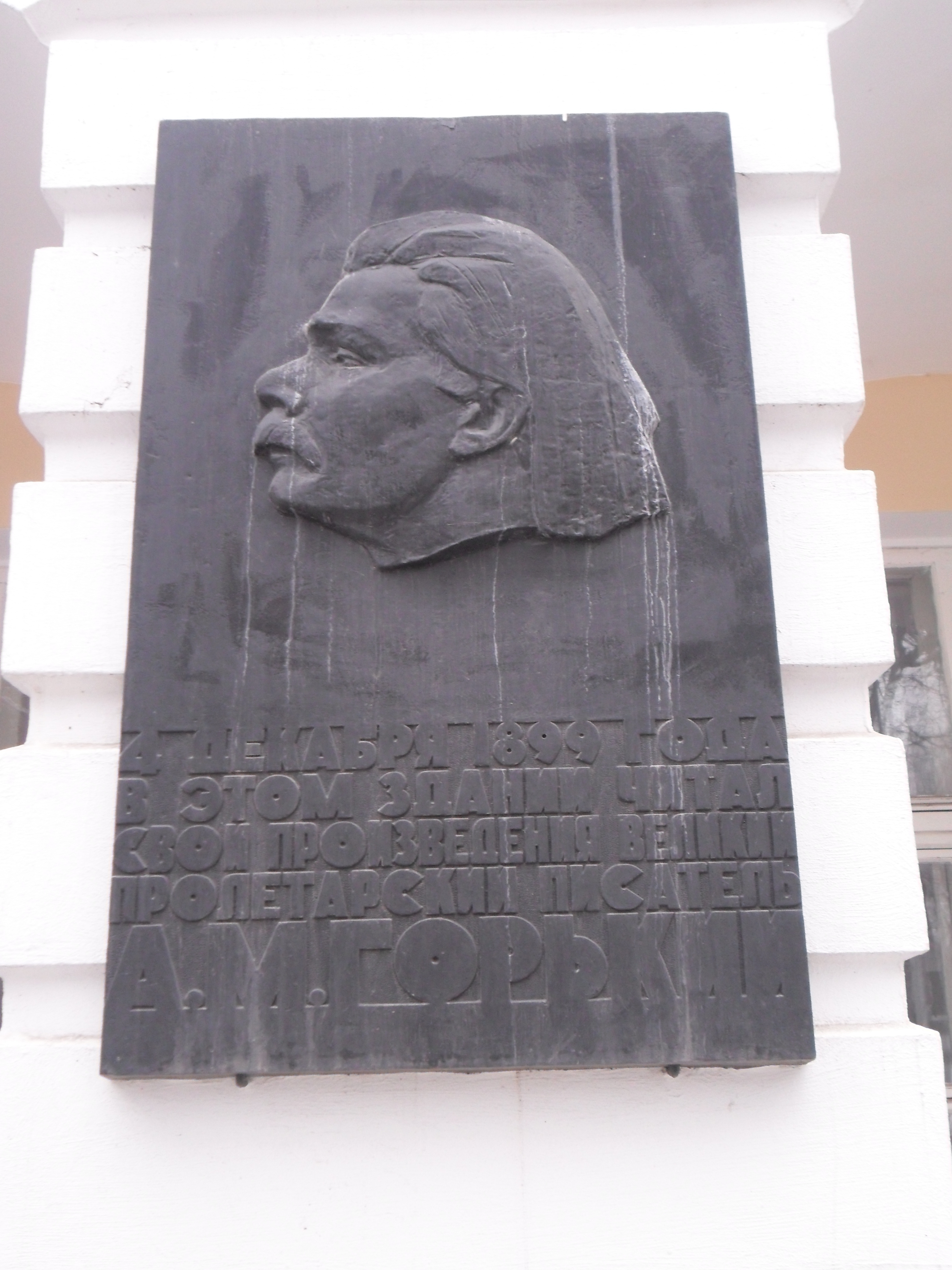
Gorky memorial plaque on Glinka street in Smolensk

- In almost every large settlement of the states of the former USSR, there was or is Gorky Street. In 2013, 2110 streets, avenues and lanes in Russia were named "Gorky", and another 395 were named "Maxim Gorky".
- Gorky was the name of Nizhny Novgorod from 1932 to 1990.
- Gorkovsky suburban railway line, Moscow
- Gorkovskoye village of Novoorsky District of Orenburg Oblast
- Gorky village in the Leningrad oblast
- Gorkovsky village (Volgograd) (formerly Voroponovo)
- Village named after Maxim Gorky, Kameshkovsky District of Vladimir Oblast
- Gorkovskoye village is the district center of Omsk Oblast (formerly Ikonnikovo)
- Maxim Gorky village, Znamensky District of Omsk Oblast
- Village named after Maxim Gorky, Krutinsky District of Omsk Oblast
- In Nizhny Novgorod the Central District Children's Library, the Academic Drama Theater, a street, as well as a square are named after Maxim Gorky. And the most important attraction there is the museum-apartment of Maxim Gorky
- Drama theaters in the following cities are named after Maxim Gorky: Moscow (MAT, 1932), Vladivostok (Primorsky Gorky Drama Theater – PGDT), Berlin (Maxim Gorki Theater), Baku (ASTYZ), Astana (Russian Drama Theater named after M. Gorky), Tula (Tula Academic Theatre), Minsk (Theater named after M. Gorky), Rostov-on-Don (Rostov Drama Theater named after M. Gorky), Krasnodar, Samara (Samara Drama Theater named after M. Gorky), Orenburg (Orenburg Regional Drama Theater), Volgograd (Volgograd Regional Drama Theater), Magadan (Magadan Regional Music and Drama Theater), Simferopol (KARDT), Kustanay, Kudymkar (Komi- Perm National Drama Theater), Young Spectator Theater in Lviv, as well as in Saint Petersburg from 1932 to 1992 (DB). Also, the name was given to the Interregional Russian Drama Theater of the Fergana Valley, the Tashkent State Academic Theater, the Tula Regional Drama Theater, and the Nur-Sultan Regional Drama Theater.
- Palaces of Culture named after Maxim Gorky were built in Nevinnomyssk, Rovenky, Novosibirsk and Saint Petersburg
- Universities: Maxim Gorky Literature Institute, Ural State University, Donetsk National Medical University, Minsk State Pedagogical Institute, Omsk State Pedagogical University, until 1993 Turkmen State University in Ashgabat was named after Maxim Gorky (now named after Magtymguly Pyragy), Sukhum State University was named after Maxim Gorky, National University of Kharkiv was named after Gorky in 1936–1999, Ulyanovsk Agricultural Institute, Uman Agricultural Institute, Kazan Order of the Badge of Honor The institute was named after Maxim Gorky until it was granted the status of an academy in 1995 (now Kazan State Agrarian University), the Mari Polytechnic Institute and Perm State University named after Maxim Gorky (1934–1993)
- The following cities have parks named after Maxim Gorky: Rostov-on-Don, Taganrog, Saratov, Minsk, Krasnoyarsk, Melitopol, Moscow, Alma-Ata
- School in Belgrade, Serbia and Podgorica, Montenegro - both named "Maksim Gorki".

=== Monuments ===
Monuments of Maxim Gorky are installed in many cities. Among them:

- In Russia – Borisoglebsk, Arzamas, Volgograd, Voronezh, Vyborg, Dobrinka, Izhevsk, Krasnoyarsk, Moscow, Nevinnomyssk, Nizhny Novgorod, Orenburg, Penza, Pechora, Rostov-on-Don, Rubtsovsk, Rylsk, Ryazan, St. Petersburg, Sarov, Sochi, Taganrog, Khabarovsk, Chelyabinsk, Ufa, Yartsevo.
- In Belarus – Dobrush, Minsk. Mogilev, Gorky Park, bust.
- In Ukraine – Donetsk, Kryvyi Rih, Melitopol, Yalta, Yasynuvata
- In Azerbaijan – Baku
- In Kazakhstan – Alma-Ata, Zyryanovsk, Kostanay
- In Georgia – Tbilisi
- In Moldova – Chișinău, Leovo
- In Italy – Sorrento
- In India – Gorky Sadan, Kolkata
- In Germany- Heringsdorf, Villa Irmgard
Monuments of Gorky
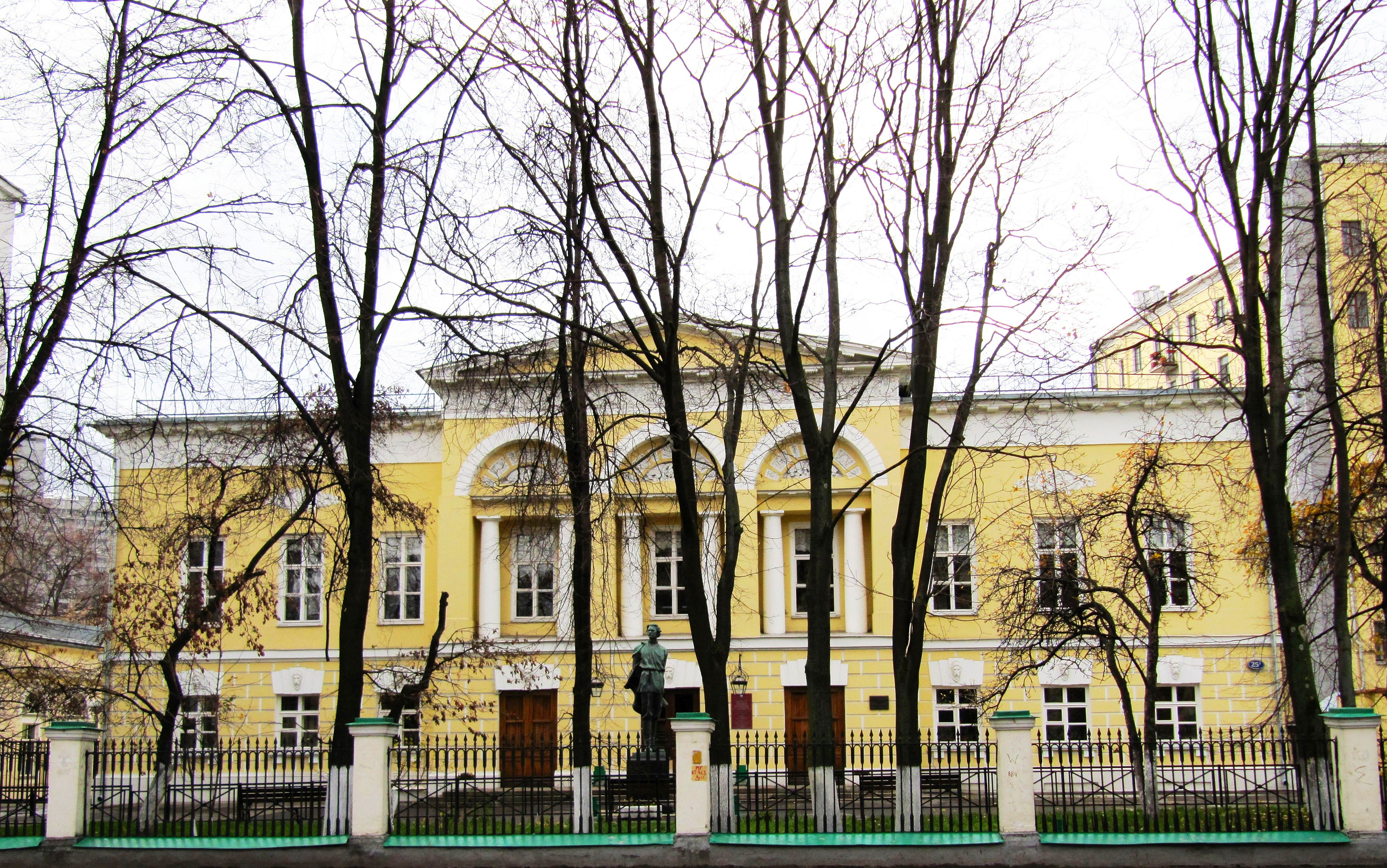
Monument at Gorky Institute of World Literature

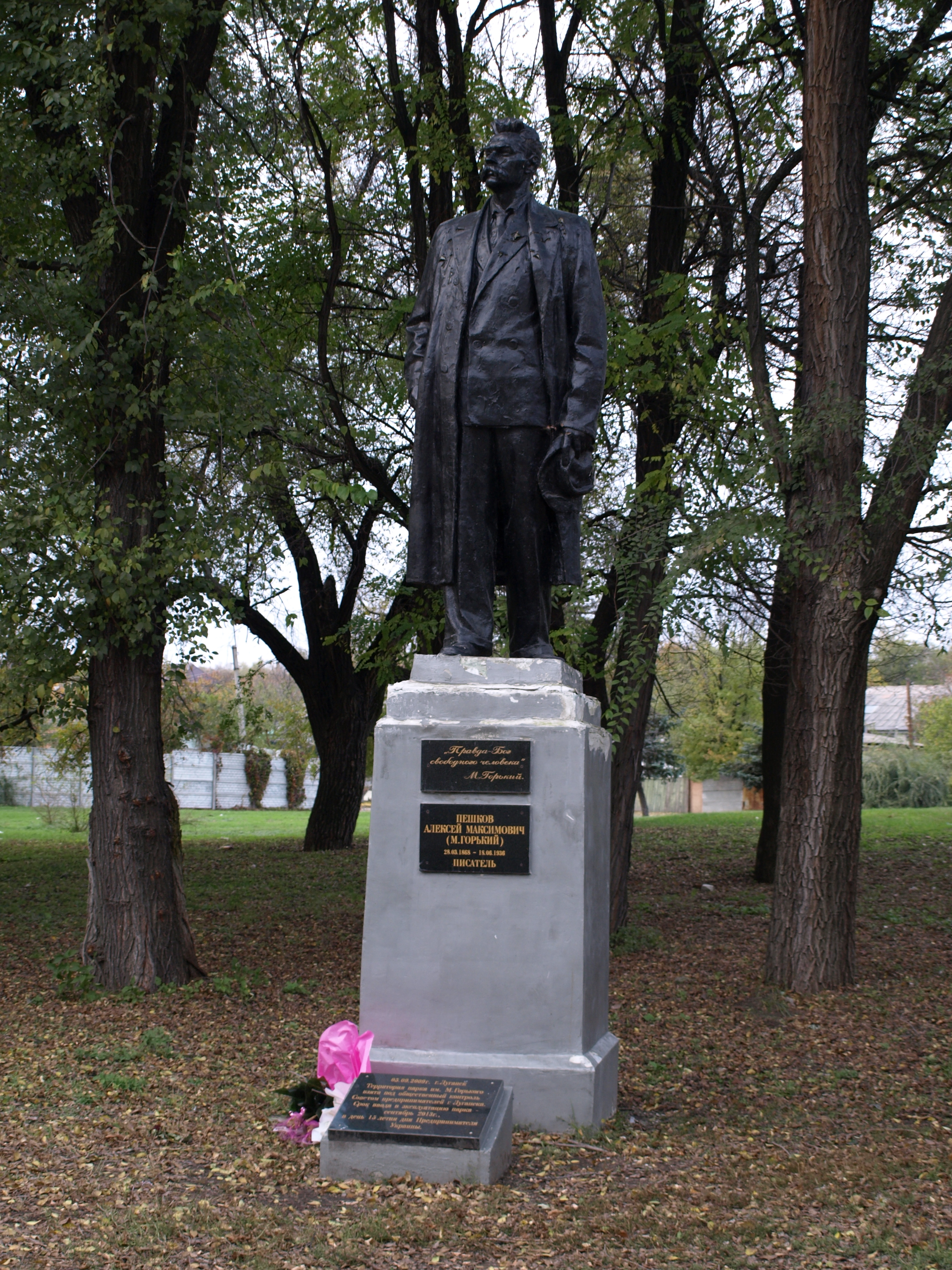
Monument in Luhansk

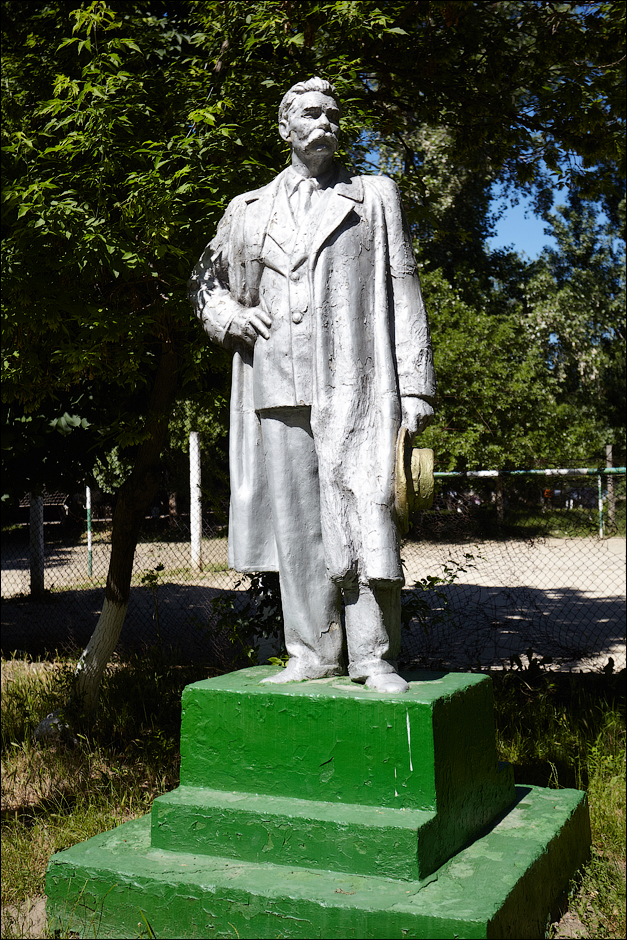
Monument in Chișinău

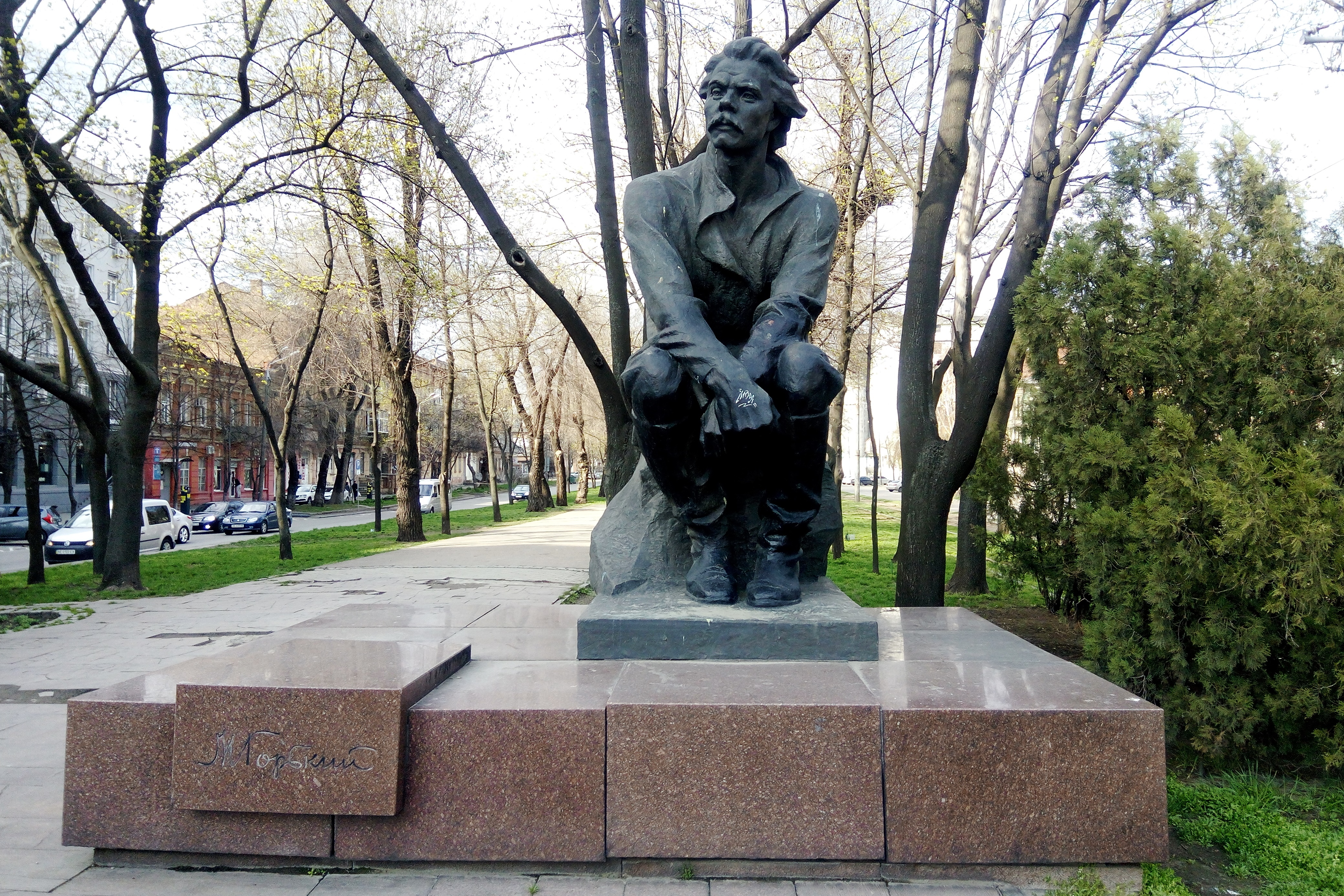
Now dismantled monument in Dnipro as it was in 2021

=== Philately ===
Maxim Gorky is depicted on postage stamps: Albania (1986), Vietnam (1968) India (1968), Maldives (2018), and many more. Some of them can be found below.

Maxim Gorky postage stamps

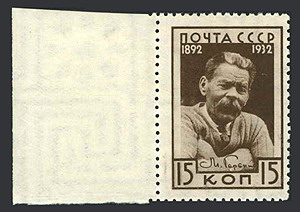
Postage stamp USSR, 1932

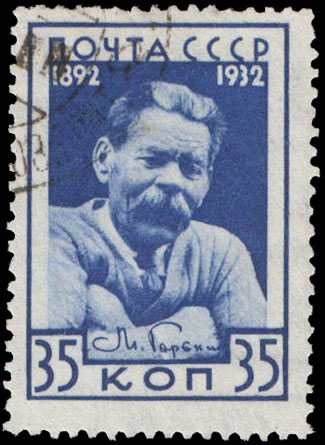
Postage stamp USSR, 1932

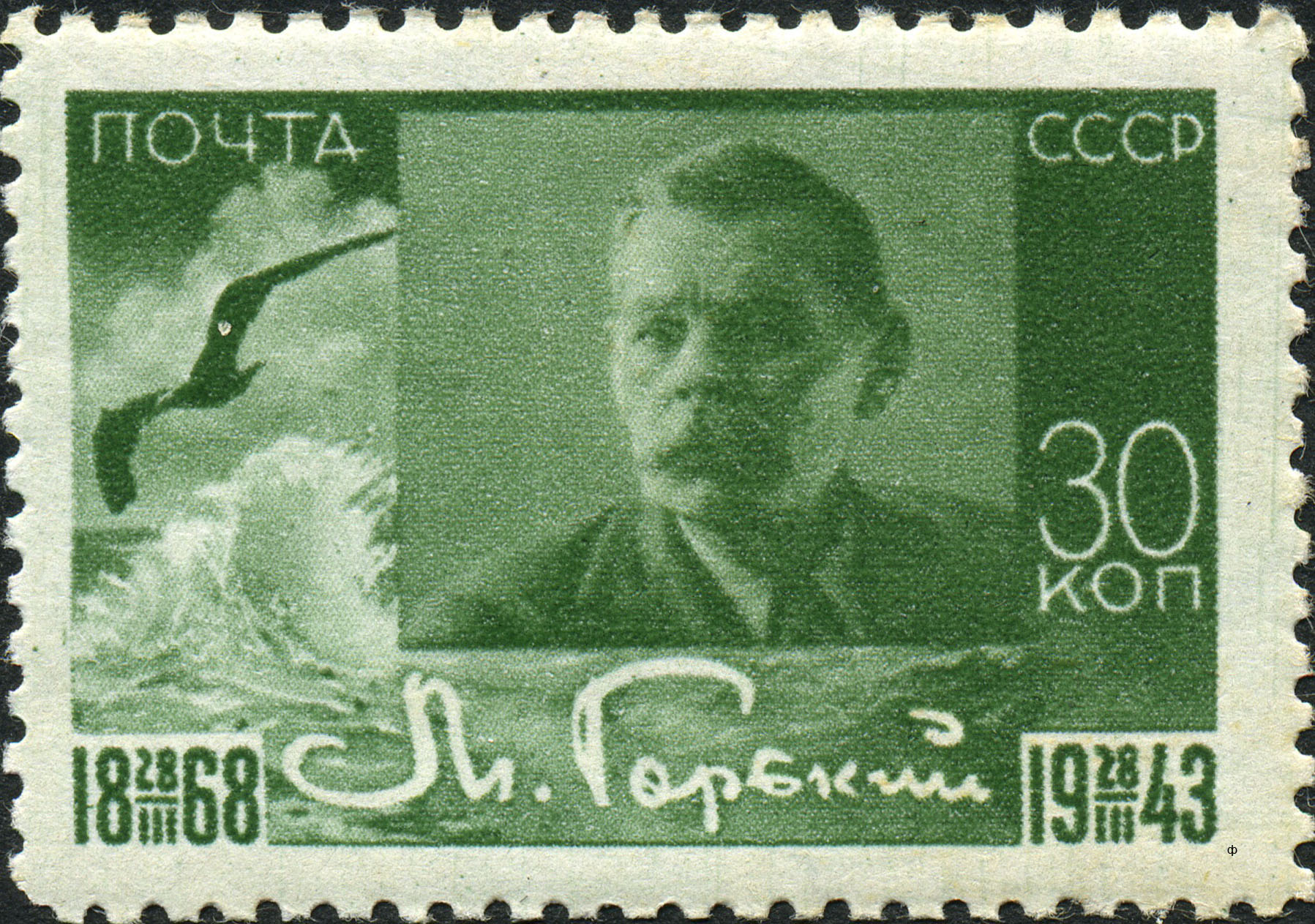
Postage stamp, the USSR, 1943

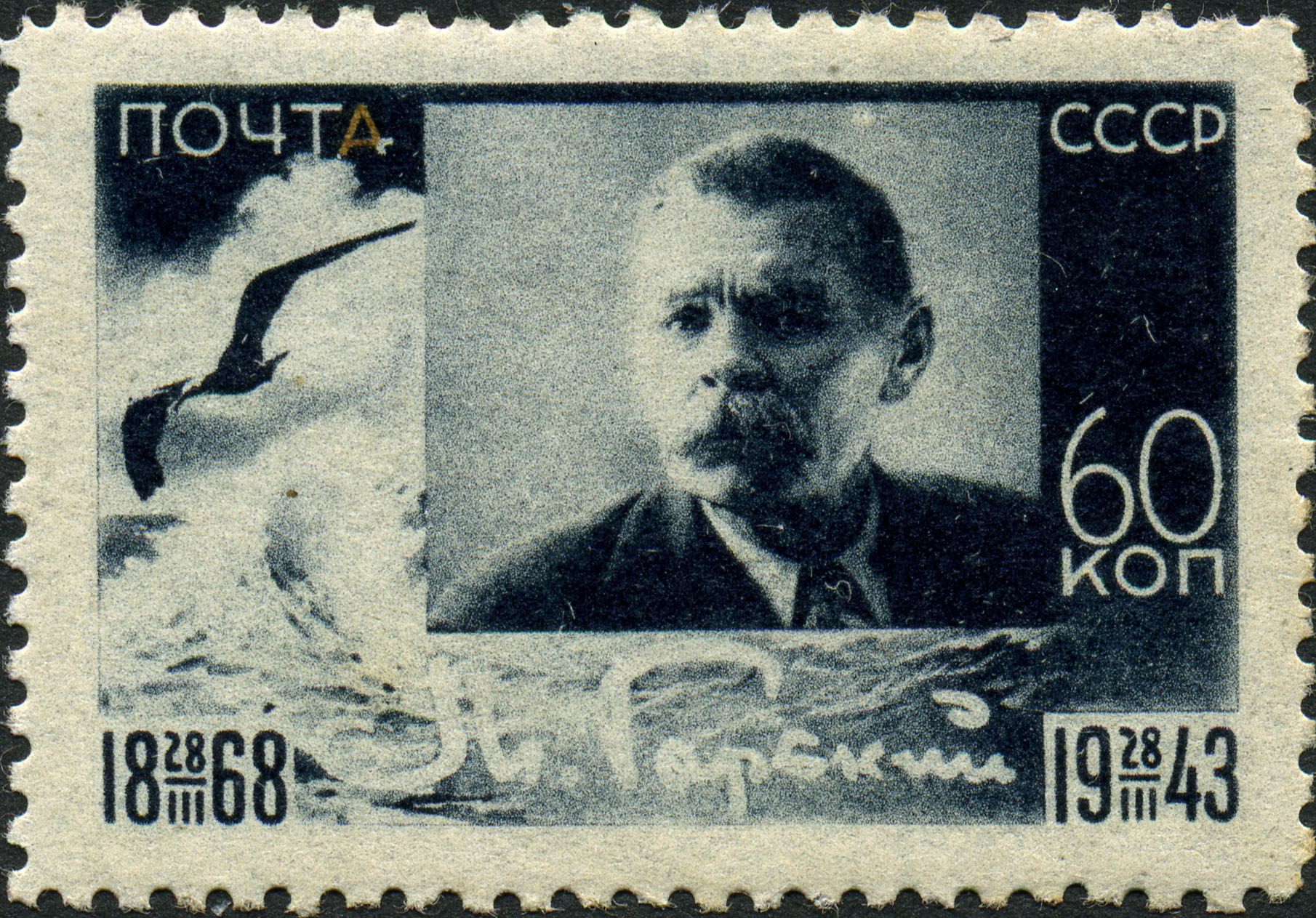
Postage stamp, the USSR, 1943

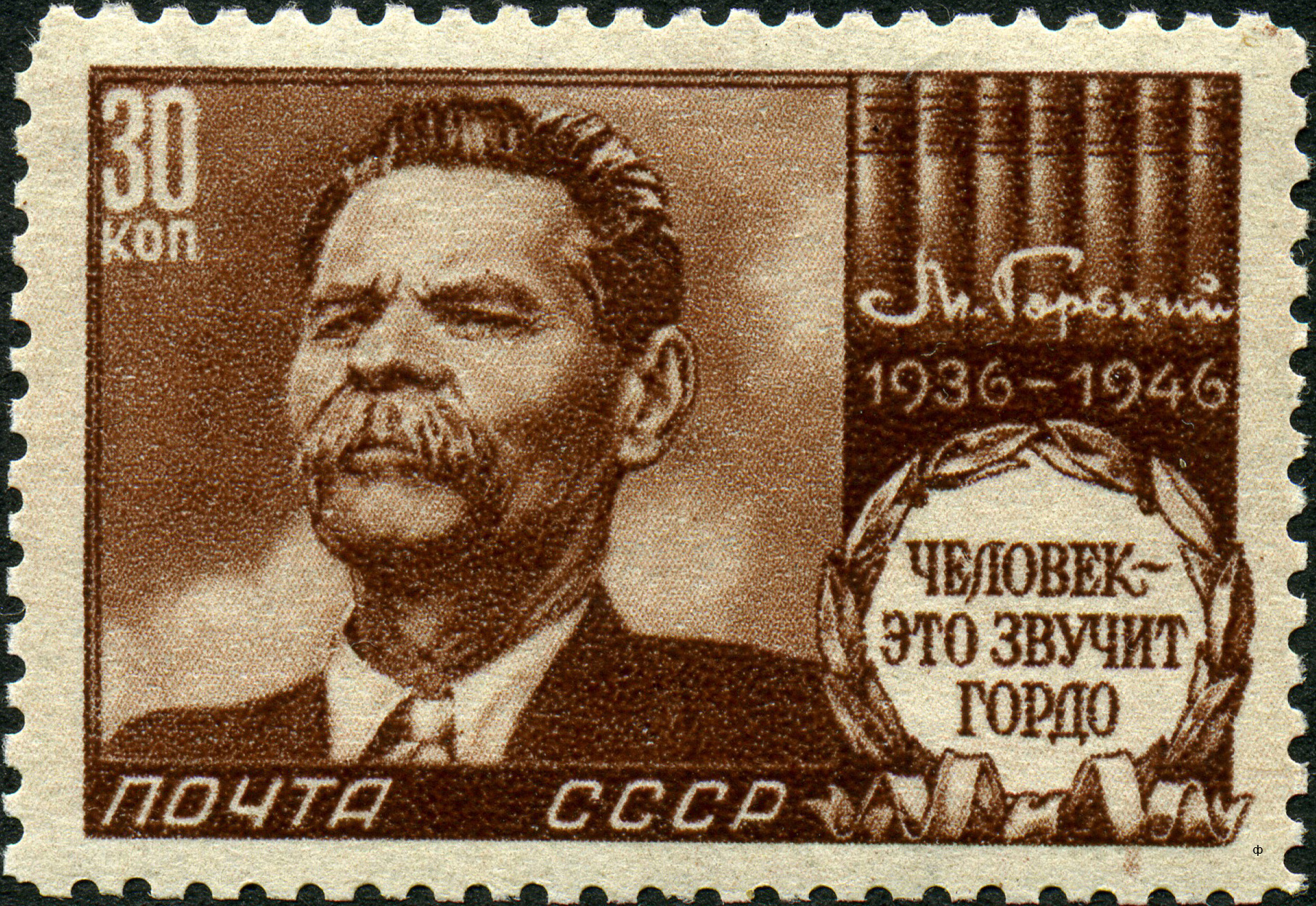
Postage stamp, the USSR, "10 years since the death of M. Gorky" (1946, 30 kopeeks)

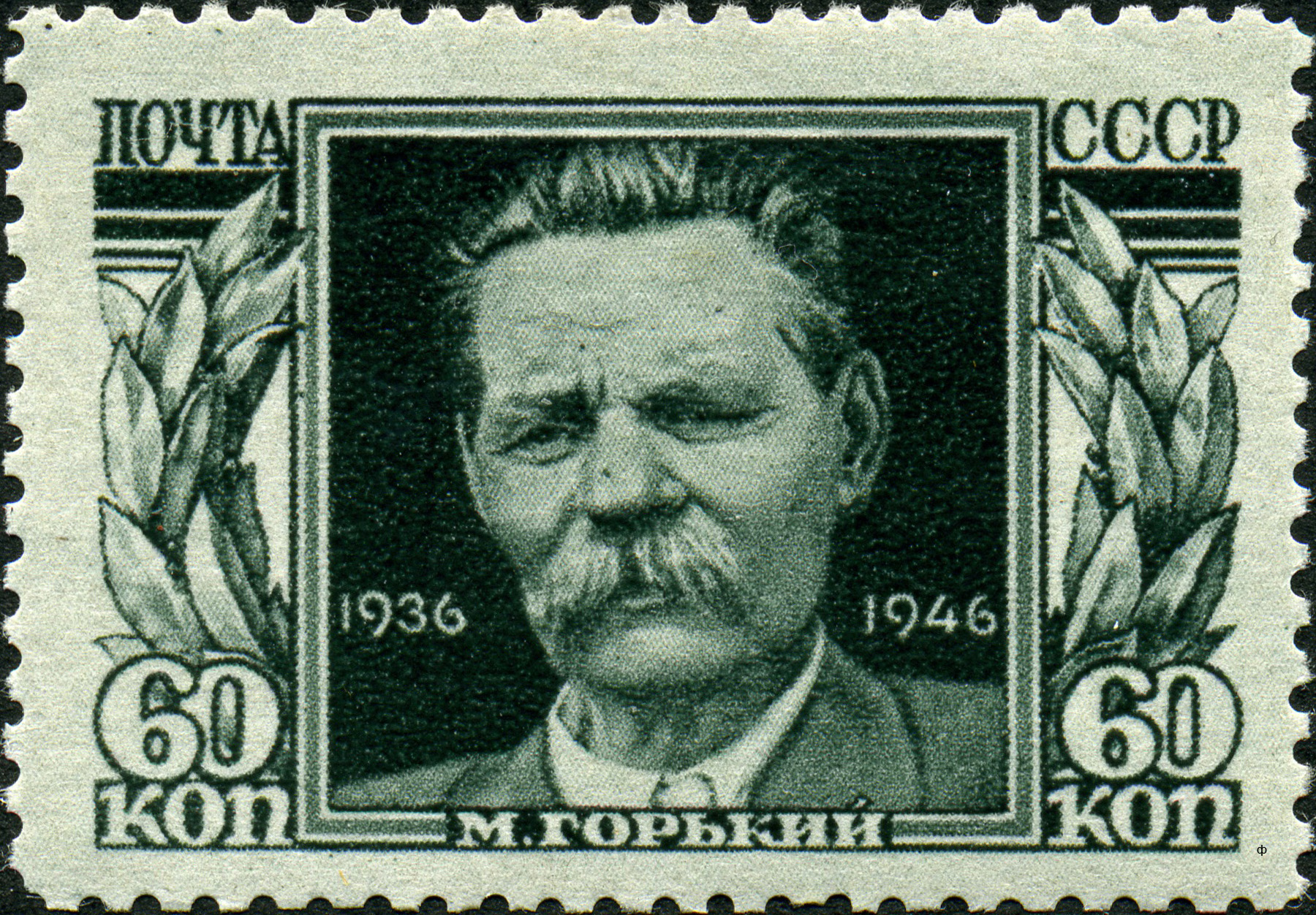
Postage stamp, the USSR, "10 years since the death of M. Gorky" (1946, 60 kopeeks)

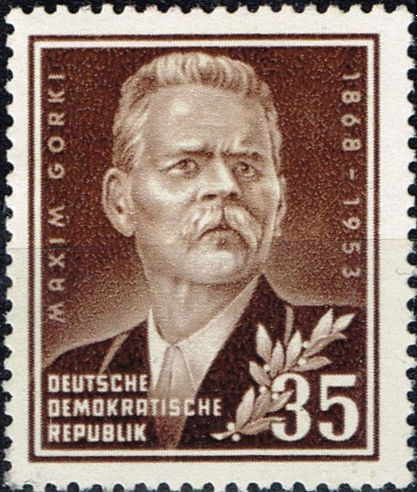
Postage stamp, GDR, 1953

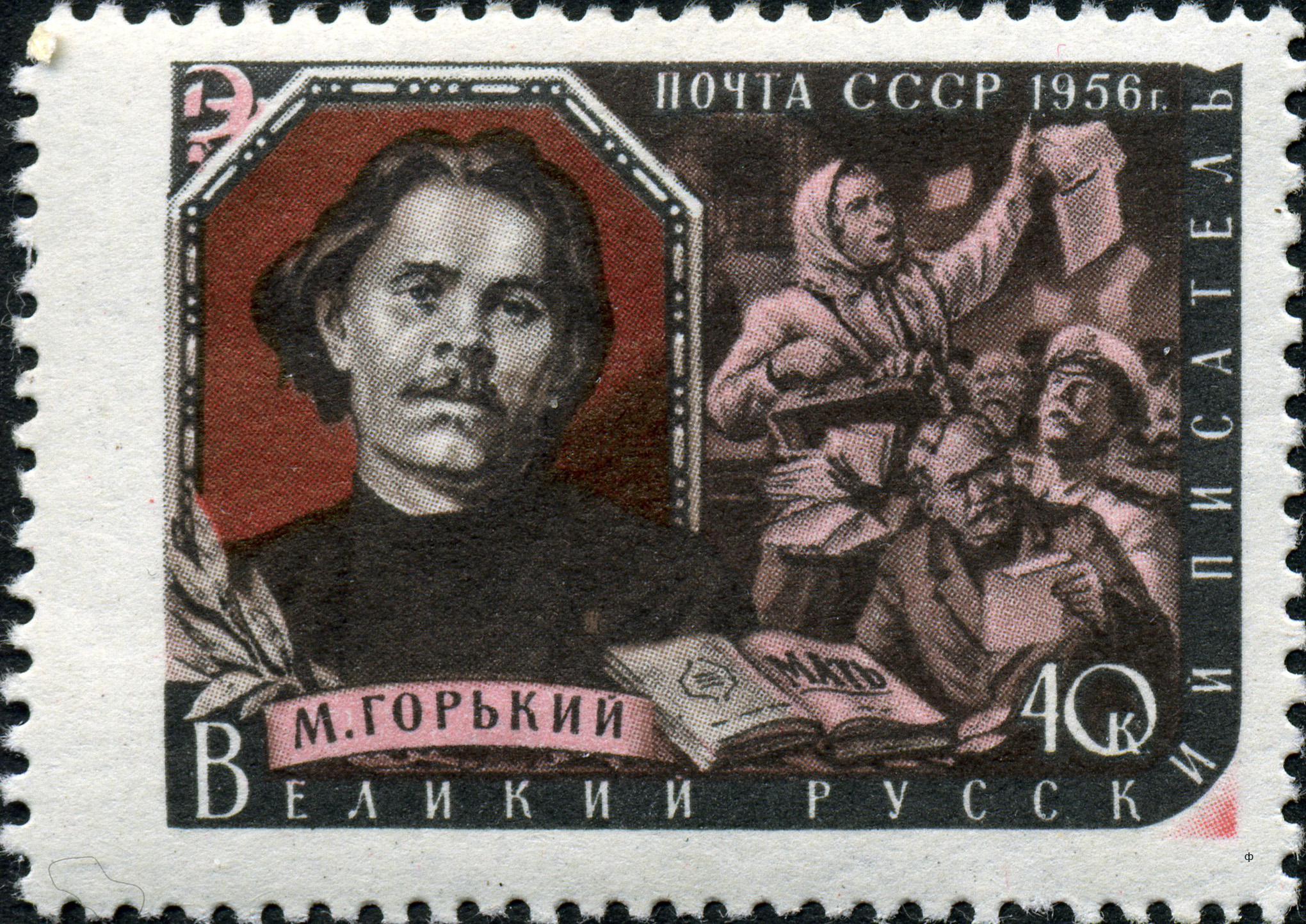
Postage stamp, the USSR, 1956

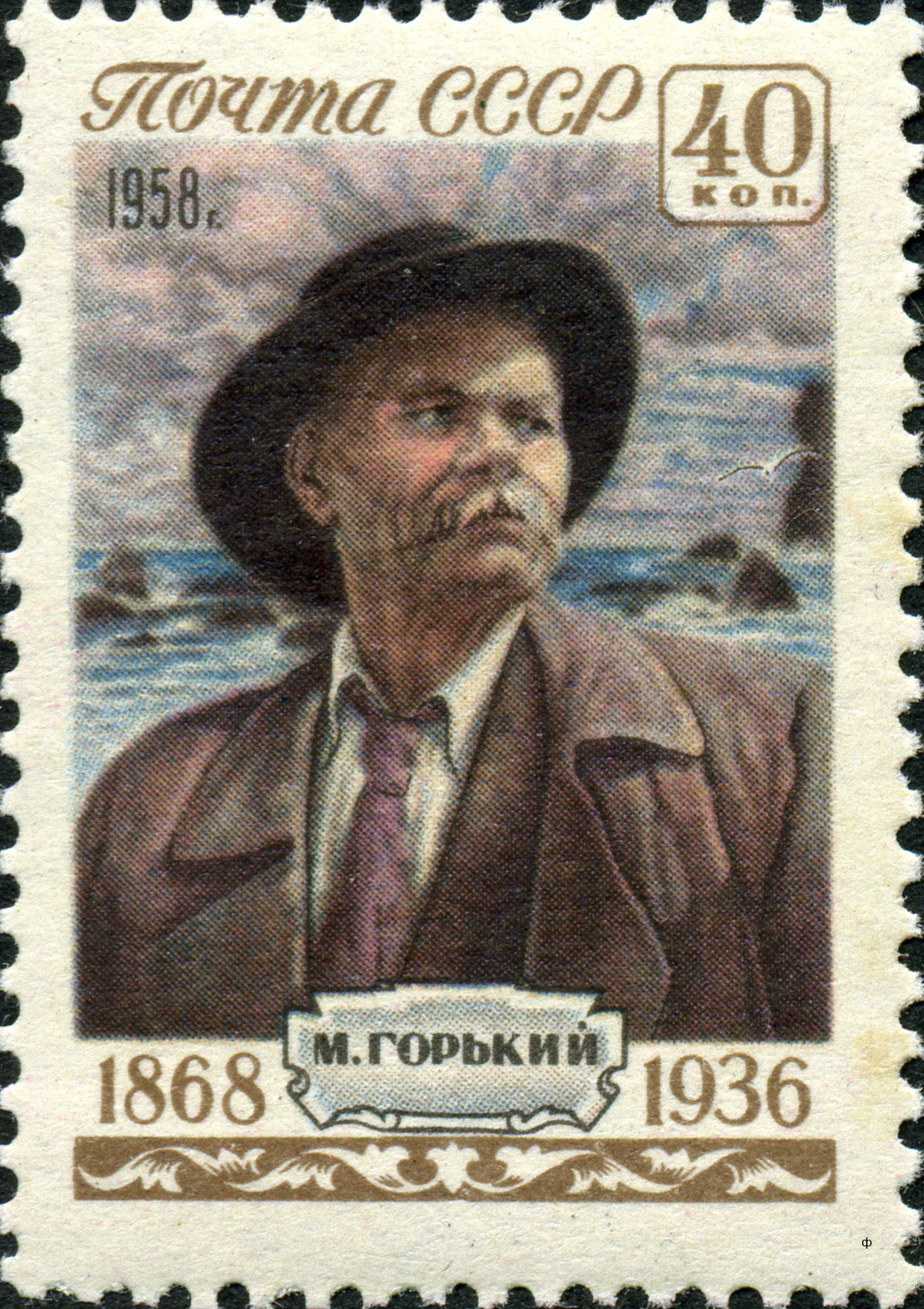
Postage stamp, the USSR, 1958

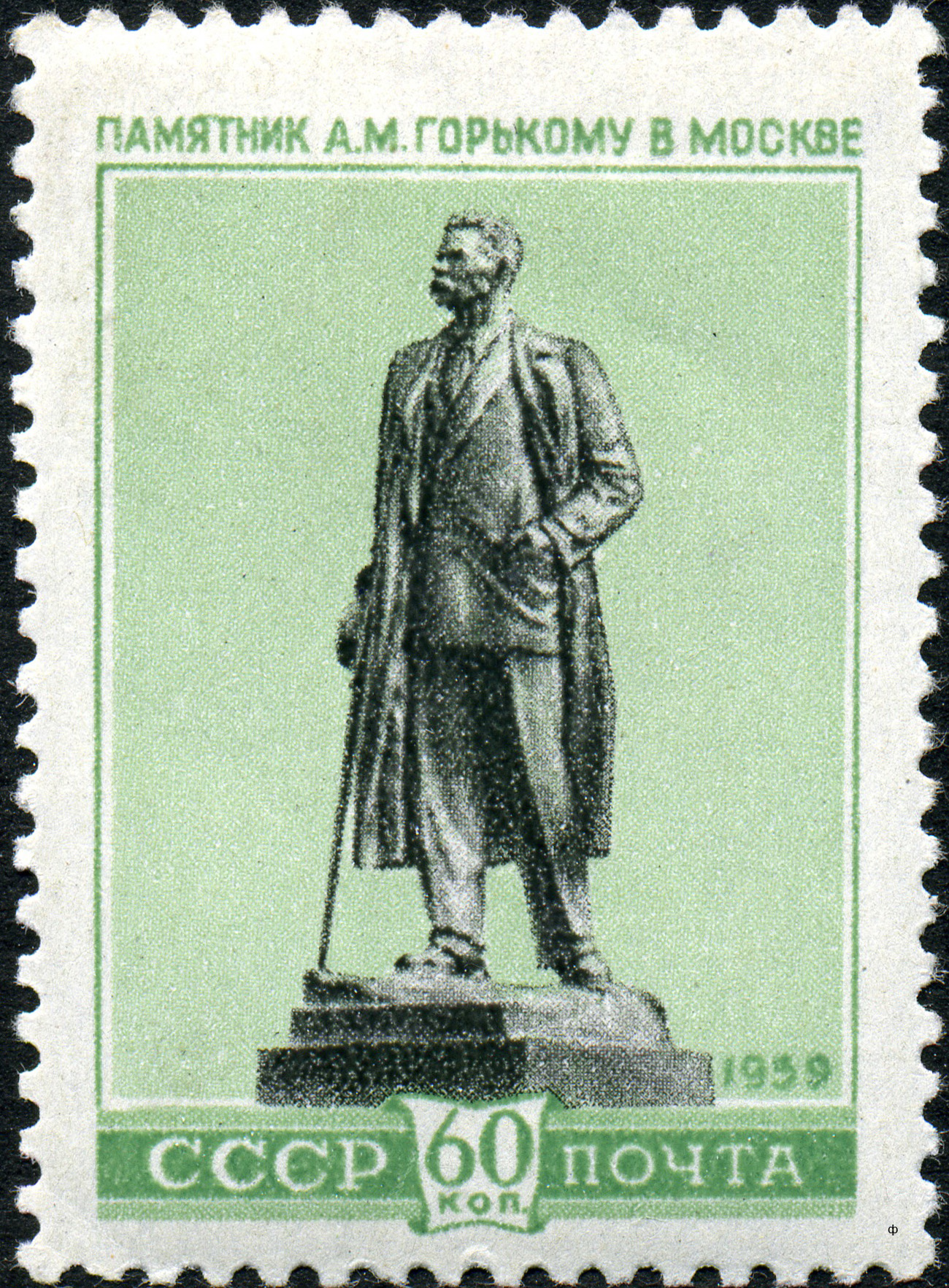
Postage stamp, the USSR, 1959

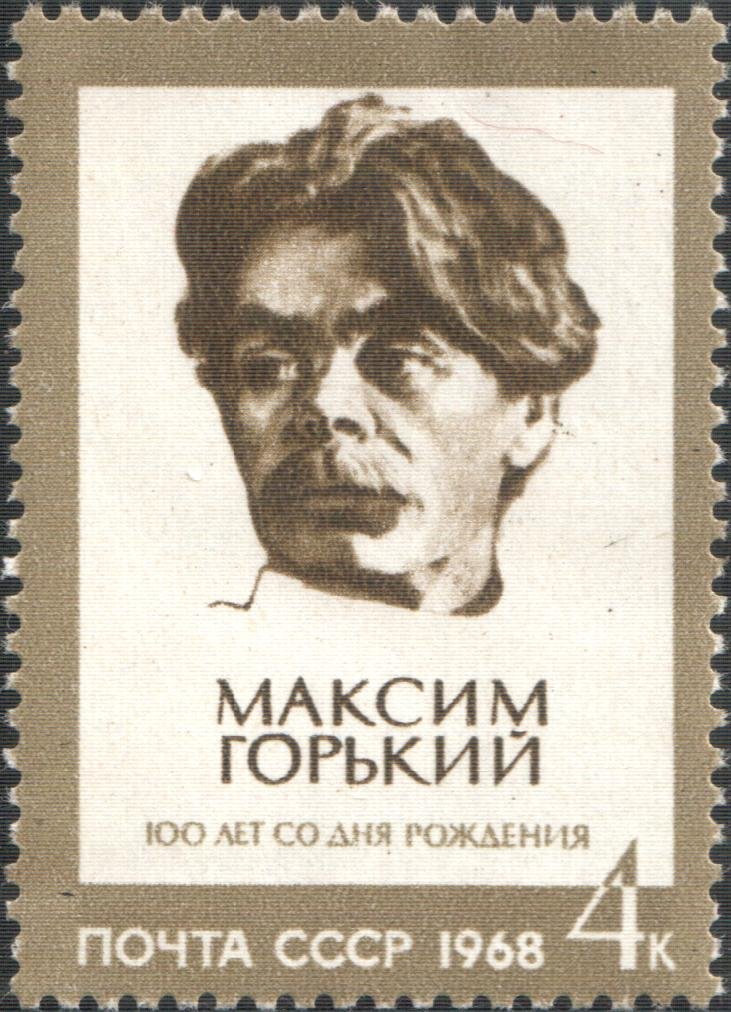
Postage stamp, the USSR, 1968

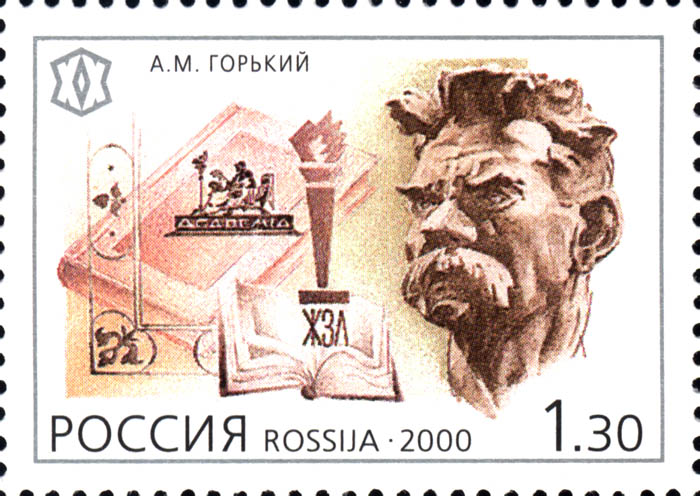
Postage stamp, Russia, "Rusiia. XX век. Culture" (2000, 1,30 rubles)

In 2018, FSUE Russian Post released a miniature sheet dedicated to the 150th anniversary of the writer.

=== Numismatics ===
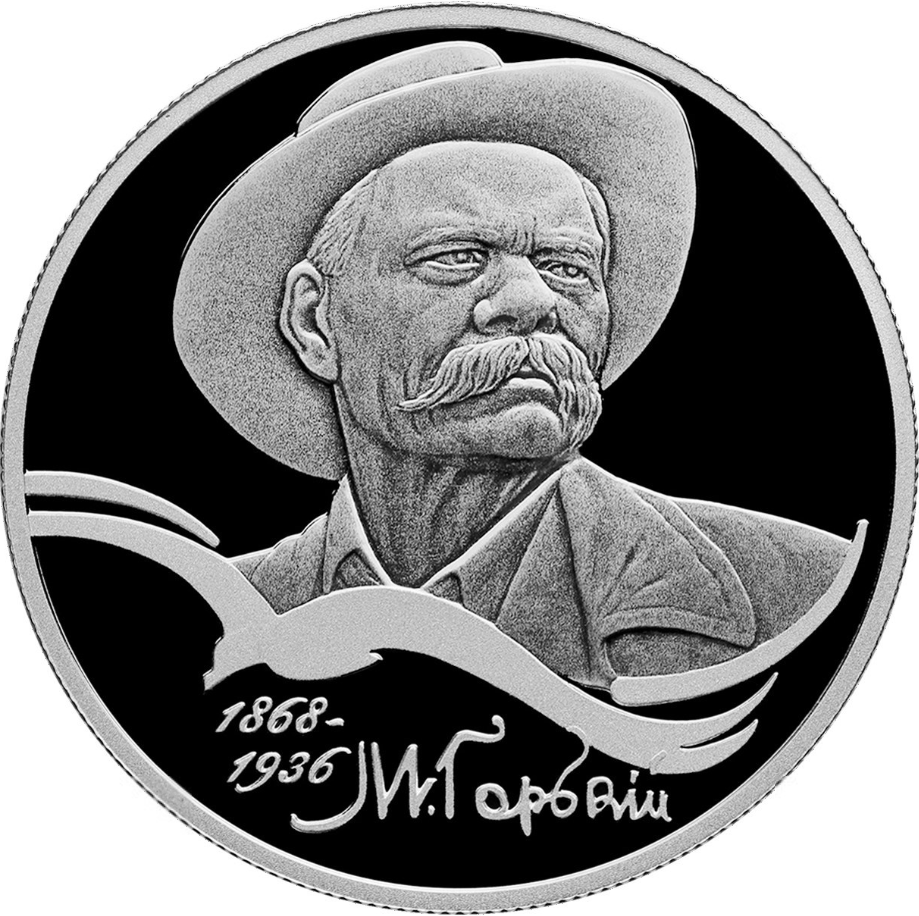
Silver commemorative coin, 2 rubles "Maxim Gorky", 2018

- In 1988, a 1 ruble coin was issued in the USSR, dedicated to the 120th anniversary of the writer.
- In 2018, on the 150th anniversary of the writer's birthday, the Bank of Russia issued a commemorative silver coin with a face value of 2 rubles in the series "Outstanding Personalities of Russia".

== Depictions and adaptations ==
- In 1912, the Italian composer Giacomo Orefice based his opera Radda on the character of Radda in Gorky's 1892 short story Makar Chudra.
- In 1932, German playwright Bertolt Brecht published his play The Mother, which was based on Gorky's 1906 novel Mother. The same novel was also adapted for an opera by Valery Zhelobinsky in 1938.
- In 1938–1939, Gorky's three-part autobiography was released by Soyuzdetfilm as three feature films: The Childhood of Maxim Gorky, My Apprenticeship and My Universities, all three directed by Mark Donskoy.
- In 1975, Gorky's 1908 play The Last Ones (Последние), had its New York debut at the Manhattan Theater Club, under the alternative English title Our Father, directed by Keith Fowler.
- In 1985, Gorky's 1906 play Enemies was translated by Kitty Hunter-Blair and Jeremy Brooks and directed in London by Ann Pennington in association with the Internationalist Theatre at the tail end of the British miners' strike of 1984–1985. Gorky's "pseudo-populism" is done away with in this production by the actors speaking "without distinctive accents and consequently without populist sentiment".
- Drawing from Maxim Gorky's celebrated novel Mother, the silent Mother (1926 film), directed by Vsevolod Pudovkin, was crafted with profound artistry.

== See also ==
- Bibliography of the Russian Revolution and Civil War
- Outline of the Russian Revolution and Civil War
- Index of articles related to the Russian Revolution and Civil War
- Gorky Park in Moscow and Central Park (former Park of Maxim Gorky) in Kharkiv, Ukraine
- Maxim Gorky Literature Institute
- Palace of Culture named after Maxim Gorky, Novosibirsk
- Soviet cruiser Maxim Gorky, a Project 26bis (or Kirov-class) light cruiser, which served from 1940 to 1956 and was awarded the Order of the Red Banner in 1944
- Tupolev ANT-20 aircraft, nicknamed "Maxim Gorky"
- Znanie Publishers
- The Lives of Remarkable People

== Sources ==
- Banham, Martin, ed. 1998. The Cambridge Guide to Theatre. Cambridge: Cambridge University Press. ISBN 0-521-43437-8.
- Benedetti, Jean (1999). Stanislavski : His Life and Art : a Biography (3rd, rev. and expanded ed.). London: Methuen. ISBN 0-413-52520-1. OCLC 1109272008.
- Egorova, L. P.; Fokin, A. A.; Ivanova, I. N.; et al. (2014). L. P. Egorova (ed.). История русской литературы XX века (первая половина): в 2 кн. Кн. 1: Общие вопросы [History of Russian Literature of the 20th Century. The first half: In 2 books. Book 1: General questions] (PDF) (Textbook) (in Russian) (2nd ed.). Moscow: Flinta. ISBN 978-5-9765-1834-6.
- Figes, Orlando: A People's Tragedy: The Russian Revolution: 1891–1924 The Bodley Head, London. (2014) ISBN 978-0-14-024364-2
- Freeborn, Richard (1982). The Russian Revolutionary Novel: Turgenev to Pasternak. Cambridge: Cambridge University Press. ISBN 0-521-24442-0.
- McSmith, Andy (2015). Fear and the Muse Kept Watch, The Russian Masters – from Akhmatova and Pasternak to Shostakovich and Eisenstein – under Stalin. New York: The New Press. ISBN 9781620970799. OCLC 907678164.
- Mirsky, D. S. (1925). Contemporary Russian Literature, 1881–1925. Archived from the original on 1 October 2021.
- Moynahan, Brian (1992). Comrades : 1917 — Russia in Revolution. Boston: Little, Brown. ISBN 978-0-316-58698-6. OCLC 1028562793 – via Internet Archvive.
- Worrall, Nick (1996). The Moscow Art Theatre. Theatre Production Studies ser. London; New York: Routledge. ISBN 0-415-05598-9.
