= Loiko (disambiguation) =

Loiko is a surname.

Loiko or Loyko (from Russian: Лойко) may also refer to:

- Loiko Zobar:
  - a character from the 1895 short story Makar Chudra by Maxim Gorky
  - a character from the 1975 Soviet film Gypsies Are Found Near Heaven loosely based o Gorky's short story
- Loyko, Roma musical group
