= Pogrebinsky =

Pogrebinsky (also spelled Pogrebinski, Pogrebinskii, and Pogrebinskiy) is a Russian and Ukrainian surname and may refer to:

== People with the surname ==
- Alexander Pogrebinsky, American painter
- Elliana Pogrebinsky, American ice dancer
- Matvei Pogrebinsky, Russian revolutionary
