= Chelkash =

- Short story by Maxim Gorky
- Original title: Челкаш
- Country: Russia
- Language: Russian

Publication
- Published in: Russkoye Bogatstvo magazine
- Publication date: June 1895

"Chelkash" (Russian: Челкаш) is a short story by Maxim Gorky, written in August 1894 and first published by Russkoye Bogatstvo in June 1895. The first of the numerous Gorky stories to appear in this magazine, it made the author well known in Russia and was included in all editions of the Complete Works by Maxim Gorky.

== Background and publication ==
The story was written in August 1894 in Nizhny Novgorod, after Vladimir Korolenko's request to "do something substational for the journal."

"I came home, sat down and started at once to write the story related to me by this bosyak (Note: Literally: 'barefooted one'. A poor tramp, belonging to a large community of unemployed, homeless and marginalized men in Russia of the time. Gorky in his youth travelled a lot, met many such men and his early works earned him the (not entirely justified) reputation of 'a bosyak writer'.) from Odessa, whom I found myself in a hospital ward with, in Nikolayev... In two days' time it was finished and I sent the rough copy to V.G.",

Gorky remembered later. In his 1926 memoirs Gorky described the prototype as

"... a tramp from Odessa, a former soldier, an army grenadier." "[I] was surprised by the good, whimsical humor of this Odessa tramp as he was telling me about the incident which became the foundation for my story, Chelkash... I remember so well his smile, baring his fine white teeth, the smile with which he concluded his tale about the treacherous young man he'd hired for work." Gorky wrote in another piece.

Korolenko, who rated the story very high, later tried to play down his own role in Gorky's professional progress.

"Many think that it was due to my patronage that he became a writer. That's a myth. He did that thanks to his huge talent. I only read his early stories and gave him my frank opinions" he wrote.

Gorky, in his later essay on Korolenko, quoted the latter:

"In the rough copy [of Chelkash] there are places where you clash with grammar to great disadvantage for the latter, so I corrected these. Apart from that I changed nothing".

In another piece of memoirs Gorky noted:

"I think Kor[olenko] edited nothing in Chelkash, he just advised me to get rid of one scene, when Chelkash watches the street children playing, which I did."

== Plot ==
Grigory Chelkash, a hard-drinking but shrewd smuggler, looks for Mishka, his partner in crime, and learns that he had got injured and is now in the hospital. Badly in need for somebody who'd row his boat for the night, in the port he approaches Gavrila, a young peasant man who seems to be badly in need of money.

Initially thinking he'd been commissioned for a routine night fishing trip, the boy starts to panic amidst the sea, realizing he's let himself into something dangerous and against the law. After a risky but successful voyage, the two finally transport the load to the smugglers' boat, then fall asleep in a cabin inside. In the morning Gavrila receives his advance, forty rubles. For him, this is a huge sum, but it starts to look meager as he learns that Chelkash left himself five hundred.

Overpowered by the desire to get rich overnight and leave all his troubles behind, he falls on his knees and implores the older man to give him the whole sum. Disgusted with the way the money's made the young man lose his dignity, Chelkash hands him down everything he's got. Gavrila, delirious with joy, confesses that he thought of killing him previously while still in the boat. Outraged, Chelkash grabs all the money and walks away. He gets hit by a stone from behind and falls down, bleeding from the back of his head. Mad now with fear and remorse, the boy is again on his knees, begging for forgiveness. Full of anger and disdain, Chelkash throws to Gavrila most of the money and staggers away, never to see him again. Satisfied with his gain, Gavrila steadily walks in the opposite direction.
