= Twenty-six Men and a Girl =

Story by Maksim Gorki

- Short story by Maxim Gorky
- Original title: Двадцать шесть и одна
- Country: Russia
- Language: Russian
- Genre: Short story

Publication
- Publication date: 1899

Twenty-six Men and a Girl (Russian: Двадцать шесть и одна, romanized: Dvadtsat shest i odna) is an 1899 short story by the Russian writer Maxim Gorky.

== Plot ==
Twenty-six men labor making kringles in a cellar, which is effectively a sweatshop. They are looked down upon by all around them, including the bun bakers. Their only seeming solace is the sixteen-year-old housemaid Tanya who visits them every morning for kringles they secretly give her. They adore her, and when speaking about her, they never allow themselves their usual dirty talk about women.

A new baker, a soldier, joins the bun bakers. Unlike all others they know, he befriends them, boasting of his virility with women. He bets he can seduce Tanya and actually does this, inviting them to peep for a proof.

After witnessing the meeting of the soldier and Tanya, the bakers surround her and yell abuse at her. After regaining her composure, she rebukes them. Afterwards, Tanya never stops at the bakery again.

== Reception ==
The only one of Gorky's early stories which makes one forget all his shortcomings (except the mediocrity of his style) is that which may be considered as closing the period, "Twenty-six Men and a Girl" (1899)... The story is cruelly realistic. But it is traversed by such a powerful current of poetry, by such a convincing faith in beauty and freedom and in the essential nobility of man, and at the same time it is told with such precision and necessity, that it can hardly be refused the name of a masterpiece. It places Gorky, the young Gorky, among the true classics of our literature. But "Twenty-six Men and a Girl" is alone in its supreme beauty - and it is the last of Gorky's early good work: for fourteen years he was to be a wanderer in tedious and fruitless mazes.

— D. S. Mirsky
