= Queer People =

Russian play

- Written by: Maxim Gorky
- Original language: Russian

Queer People (Russian: Чудаки, romanized: Chudaki) is a four-act play by Maxim Gorky, also translated as Eccentrics. It was written during the spring and summer of 1910 and first published by the 1910 Znaniye Collection (Book 32) in Saint Petersburg. It came out as a separate edition via the Berlin-based Ladyzhnikov Publishers. On 2 September 1910 it received permission to be produced on stage the Russian Imperial Theatres.

In 1923 the play was for the first time included into the Complete Works by Maxim Gorky. In 1933 Gorky edited the text of the play, before including it into Volume 10 of his Complete Works published by Khudozhestvennaya Literatura.
