= Makar Chudra =

- Short story by Maxim Gorky
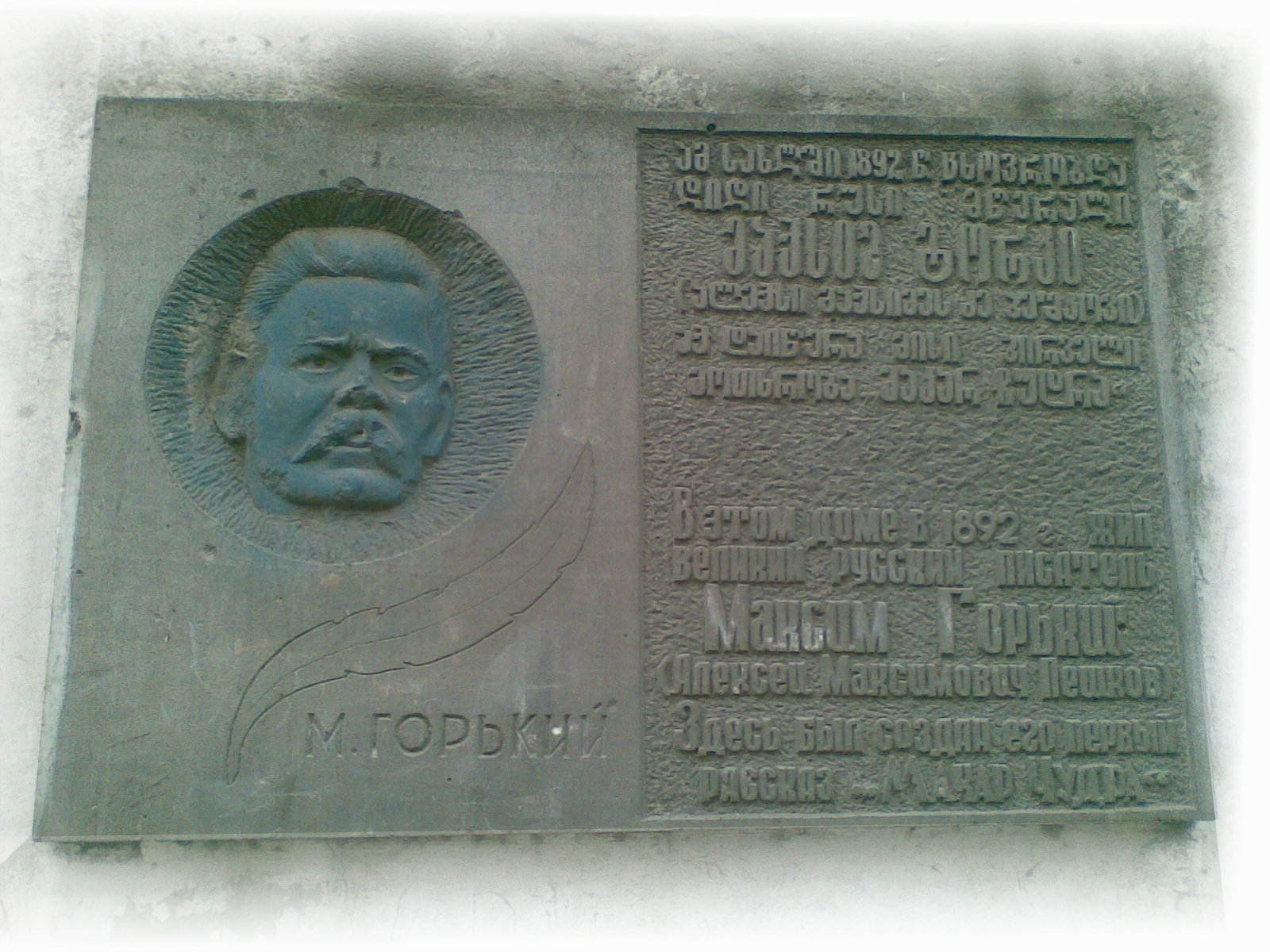
- The Gorky plaque on the wall of the house in Tbilisi where the story was written
- Original title: Макар Чудра
- Country: Russia
- Language: Russian

Publication
- Published in: Kavkaz newspaper
- Publication date: 12 September 1892

"Makar Chudra" (Russian: Макар Чудра) is an 1892 short story by Maxim Gorky, first published by the Tiflis newspaper Kavkaz, in the No. 242, 12 September 1892 issue.

== Background ==
"Makar Chudra" was the second published story by the author after "Emelyan Pilyai", and the first signed "M. Gorky". It was written in the summer of 1892 in Tiflis, where Gorky spent several weeks doing menial jobs, mostly for the Caucasian Railway workshops. Soon after the publication, in October, he returned to his native Nizhny Novgorod.

Instrumental in the publication was Alexander Kalyuzny, a leftist radical, who first encouraged his young friend to put to paper the story the latter had been relating to him verbally, and later handed the manuscript to his journalist friend Tsvetnitsky, who furthered it to the Kavkaz editors. In his 1925 letter to Kalyuzhny, Gorky wrote: "For thirty years I've been serving the Russian art, and all thanks to the impulse you'd given me."

== Plot ==
The narrator meets an old Roma traveller Makar Chudra and has a conversation with him outside the camp, revolving mostly around the theme of freedom. Noticing his guest's interest in his daughter Nonka's singing, Makar warns him against falling victim to female charms and relates a story of a strong, handsome and fearless man Loiko Zobar and Radda, the latter's beauty matched only by her fierce sense of independence. Radda, well aware of her power over Loiko, orders him to kneel before her, in the presence of other men. His spirits crushed, he promises to do so the next day. Which he does, but only after putting his knife through the heart of his beloved one, to be promptly killed by Danilo, Radda's father.

The story ends with the narrator having a vision: bleeding Radda walking through the skies, and Loiko behind, never able to catch up with her.

== Adaptations ==
In 1976 the Emil Loteanu film Gypsies Are Found Near Heaven came out, based upon "Makar Chudra", although fragments of "Old Izergil", another early story by Gorky, were incorporated into the plotline too.
