= Ikonnikovo =

Ikonnikovo Иконниково
- Village
- Location within Vologda Oblast Location within Russia
- Coordinates: 60°22′N 38°03′E
- Country: Russia
- Region: Vologda Oblast
- District: Vashkinsky District
- Time zone: UTC+3:00

Ikonnikovo (Russian: Иконниково) is a rural locality (a village) in Roksomskoye Rural Settlement, Vashkinsky District, Vologda Oblast, Russia. The population was 6 as of 2002.

== Geography ==
Ikonnikovo is located 22 km northeast of Lipin Bor (the district's administrative centre) by road. Vesyolaya is the nearest rural locality.
