= Loiko =

Loiko or Loyko (Belarusian: Лойка, Ukrainian: Лойко) is a Slavic surname. Notable people with the surname include:

- Ivan Loiko (1892–?), Russian flying ace
- Sergey Loiko (born 1953), Russian journalist, writer, photographer and translator
