= Matvei Pogrebinsky =

Matvei Samoylovich Pogrebinsky (Russian: Матве́й Само́йлович Погреби́нский; 1895 – 4 April 1937) was a Russian and Soviet revolutionary.

After having served as a military commissar in Siberia during the Civil War, Pogrebinsky was responsible for setting up many orphanages and communes for delinquent children. Most notably, he founded the Bolshevo Commune in August 1924 as a part of the OGPU's broader commune program. This commune, based on a progressive vision of rehabilitation, did not have guards or fences and was focused on the gradual reconversion of every individual delinquent back into society. Pogrebinsky was the inspiration for the highly popular Soviet film, Putevka v Zhizn ("Road to Life") in 1931. This film was shot on location in the Bolshevo Commune.

Pogrebinsky was also the head of the NKVD in Gorky Oblast (current-day Nizhny Novgorod). As deputy of Genrikh Yagoda, he was allegedly involved in corruption cases and was even described as protector of "criminal brotherhoods from the prison camps". In 1937, very shortly after Yagoda's arrest, he committed suicide as he knew the NKVD was coming for him as well. According to Roy Medvedev, by committing suicide, Pogrebinsky aimed to avoid "participation in lawlessness, as his suicide letter reveals", implying that Pogrebinsky was among those who could not bear to partake in the excesses of the Great Terror. After Pogrebinsky's suicide, Gorky party chief E.K. Pramnek wanted to give him a modest funeral, but finally opted to send party members over to the funeral out of fear that thousands of Pogrebinsky's supporters might show up and sow unrest.

== See also ==
- Anton Makarenko
- Restorative justice
- Stalinism
