= Bezsonov =

Bezsonov, feminine: Bezsonova (Безсонов/Безсоновa) is a Russian surname, an old spelling variant of Bessonov. Notable people with the surname include:

- Yuri Bezsonov (1891–1970), Russian Imperial Army officer known for his escape from Soviet Solovki prison camp
- Volodymyr Bezsonov (born 1958), Ukrainian football manager and former player
- Joan-Daniel Bezsonoff
