= Red Shambhala =

2011 book by Andrei Znamenski

Red Shambhala: Magic, Prophecy, and Geopolitics in the Heart of Asia
- Author: Andrei Znamenski
- Language: English
- Publisher: Quest Books
- Publication date: 2011
- Publication place: United States
- Media type: Print (paperback)
- Pages: 304
- ISBN: 0835608913

Red Shambhala: Magic, Prophecy, and Geopolitics in the Heart of Asia is a 2011 non-fiction work by Andrei Znamenski. The book explores the links between Bolshevik revolutionaries and their attempt to influence Vajrayana Buddhism in Mongolia and Tibet, as well as indigenous shamanic elements in the Russian Far East. In particular, some elements within the Bolsheviks were interested in using the apocalyptic Shambhala prophesies of the Kalachakra Tantra to influence the Buddhists into supporting Marxism–Leninism.

== Figures ==
- Alexander Barchenko
- Gleb Bokii
- Boris Pankratov
- Pyotr Kozlov
- Nicholas Roerich
- Ja Lama
- 9th Panchen Lama
- Agvan Dorzhiev

== Events ==
- Russian Civil War
- Mongolian Revolution of 1921
- Kalmyk Project

== See also ==
- Shambhala-Agartha
- Kalachakra Tantra
- Buddhism in Russia
- Shamanism in Siberia
- Pan-Mongolism
- Parapsychology
- The Great Game
