= Alexander Nogtev =

Soviet security official

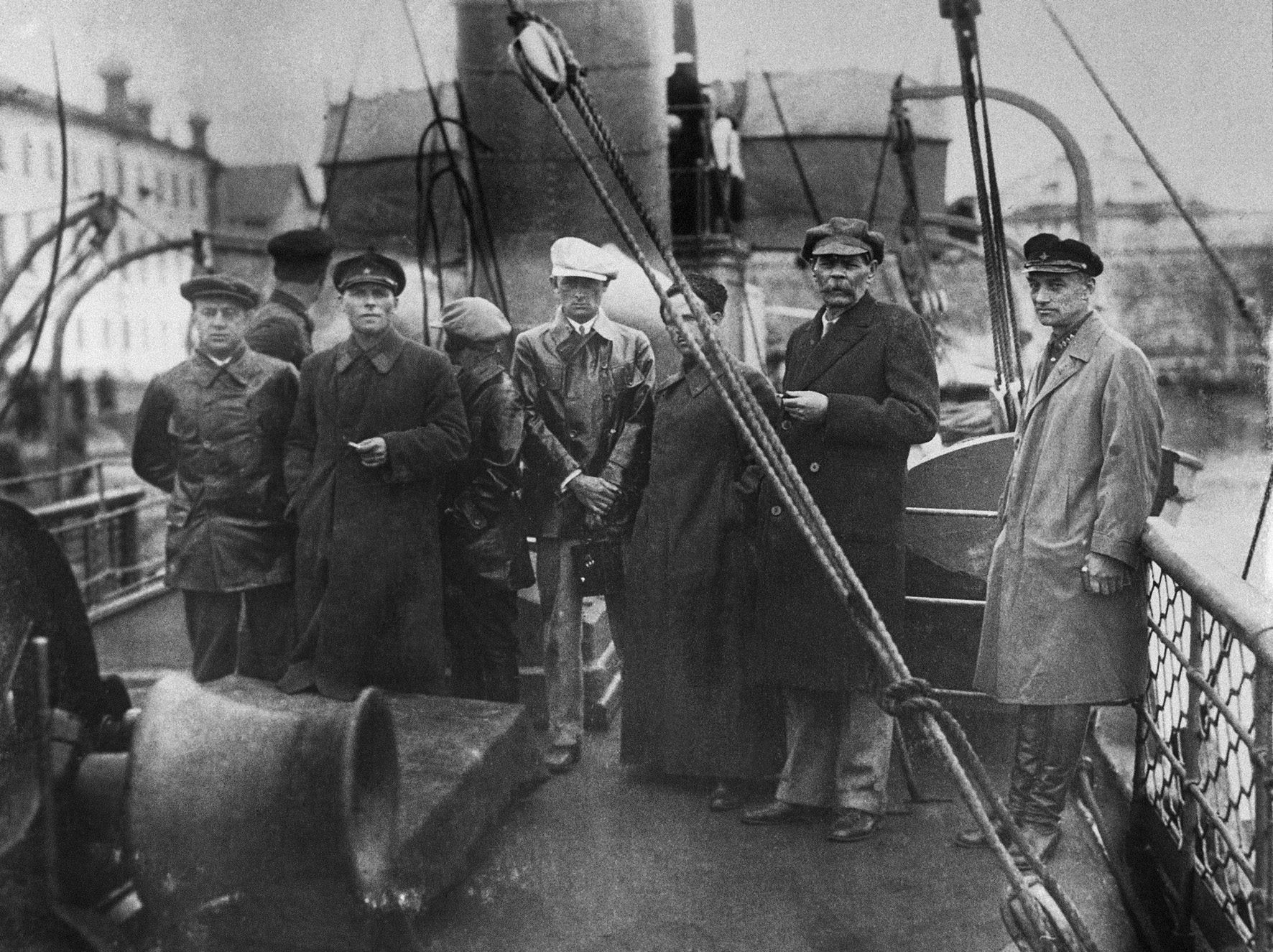
Alexander Nogtev (2nd from left) together with the writer Maxim Gorky (2nd from right) and the chief of the special department of the OGPU Gleb Boki (far right) on the deck of the steamer Gleb Boki, June 1924

Alexander Petrovich Nogtev (Russian: Александр Петрович Ногтев; 1892 – 23 April 1947) was a Soviet state security official and first commander of the Solovki prison camp.

== Biography ==
=== Early life and career ===
Alexander Nogtev was born in to a poor Russian working-class family in Gorodets. His father Pyotr, who was of peasant origins, was involved in anti-tsarist activities and had contacts with the Narodnaya Volya. After finishing school, Nogtev underwent seamanship training and was a seaman in the Russian merchant fleet. At the beginning of the First World War he was drafted into the Baltic Fleet. In 1917 Nogtev became an assistant captain on the Volga steamer Alexander Nevsky.

After the October Revolution, Nogtev joined the Communist Party in 1918. In August 1918, Nogtev and a group were sent to Kotlas to block the Northern Dvina river to the movements of ships opposed to the Bolsheviks. From September 1918 to May 1919 he was Chief Inspector for Ship Safety. In 1919 he became a commissar of a special unit in Samara on the front against Admiral Alexander Kolchak's troops and took part in battles against the Ural Army. He later commanded the 4th Army Special Forces on the Turkestan Front. On 4 May 1920, Nogtev was awarded the Order of the Red Banner.

=== SLON commander ===
From 1921 Nogtev was a member of the Cheka secret police. On 3 October 1923, he became the first commander of the Solovetsk Special Purpose Camp (SLON). According to the memoirs of former SLON prisoner Boris Shiryaev, Nogtev greeted the newly arrived prisoners with the words: “I welcome you. As you know, there is no Soviet government here, only Solovetsk government. You can forget all the rights you previously had. We have our own laws here.” During Nogtev's tenure as camp commander of the SLON, the prisoners were abused and received harsh punishments, while the camp was otherwise unable to generate any significant products. Nogtev was also notorious for personally executing prisoners, mostly former tsarist officers but also priests and criminals. Historian Hubertus Knabe has called Nogtev's methods "comparatively archaic", noting a prisoner's description of Nogtev riding his horse drunk up the 47 steps of the cathedral at three in the morning after having "inspected" the women’s barracks. Nogtev also seems to have resented the demands of the political prisoners relating to freedom of movement, curfews, and correspondence. Tensions culminated in guards opening fire on a group of political prisoners during an argument on 19 December 1923, killing six. News of the killings leaked abroad, and Communist leadership demanded an investigation, with OGPU official Gleb Bokii making an inspection the following year.

Nogtev was succeeded by Fedor Eichmans on 13 November 1925. Under Eichmans, the arbitrary abuse stopped. After Eichman's promotion to head of the 3rd Division of the OGPU's Special Service, Nogtev again became camp commandant from 20 May 1929, to 19 May 1930.

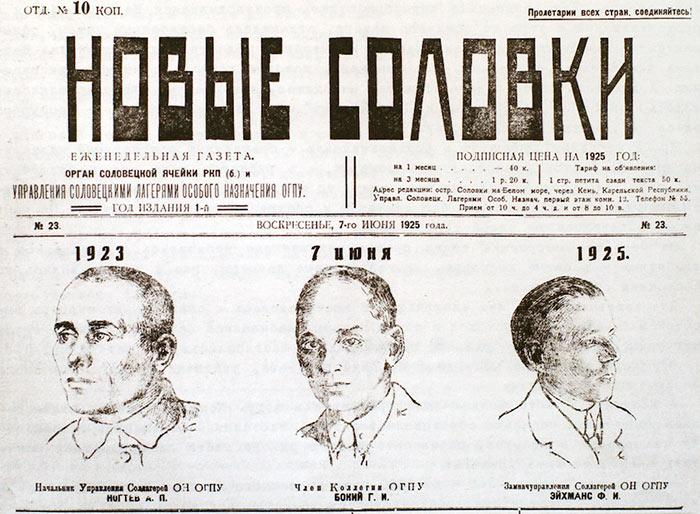
Frontpage of newspaper "New Solovezki Islands" with portraits of Nogtev, Gleb Boki and Fedor Eichmans

=== Later career and arrest ===
After 19 May 1930, Nogtev retired at the age of 38 and left the OGPU. In the 1930s he was appointed head of the Glavels of Soviet People's Commissariat of Forestry. In the course of the Great Purge, Nogtev was arrested by the NKVD in 1937. On 4 May 1939, he was sentenced to 15 years in prison by the Military Collegium of the Supreme Court and sent to the Norillag camp.

Shortly after the end of the Second World War, due to a change in the law, Nogtev's term of imprisonment was reduced to seven years, so that he was transferred to Moscow to submit his claims. However, he died there before the appeal proceedings were initiated. He was posthumously rehabilitated in November 1958.

== In fiction ==
Nogtev appears as an important character in Zakhar Prilepin's 2014 novel The Monastery and its eight-part television adaptation.
