= Bessonov =

Bessonov (masculine, Russian: Бессонов) or Bessonova (feminine, Russian: Бессонова) is a Russian surname. Notable people with the surname include:

- Anna Bessonova (born 1984), Ukrainian rhythmic gymnast
- Evgeny Bessonov (born 1968), Russian politician
- Gennady Bessonov (disambiguation)
- Ivan Bessonov (born 2002), Russian composer and pianist
- Pyotr Bessonov (1828–1898), Russian folklorist
- Vsevolod Bessonov (1932–1970), Soviet Navy submarine commander
- Sergei Bessonov (1892–1941), Soviet diplomat and politician

== See also ==
- Bezsonov
