= Nikolai Antsiferov =

Soviet historian and scholar (1889–1958)

Nikolai Pavlovich Antsiferov (Russian: Николай Павлович Анциферов; 25 July [O.S. 13 July] 1889 – September 2, 1958) was a Soviet historian and scholar of culture and local lore.

== Biography ==
Antsiferov was born in the estate of Count Potocki in Uman, Ukraine. His father, Pavel Grigor'evich Antsiferov (1851–1897) was a state counsellor and the son of a naval officer in Arkhangelsk, who took a post as an inspector of agriculture and horticulture at an institute in Uman, and later was the director of the Nikitsky Botanical Garden in Crimea from 1891. He was buried in the cemetery in Sofeiskaia Slobodka. His mother, Ekaterina Maksinovna née Petrova, was the daughter of a Tver peasant. She was born in 1853 in Saint Petersburg and died in 1933.

Following the death of his father, Nikolai Antsiferov lived with his mother in Pulavy (in present-day Poland), and then in Kiev where he studied at the first Kiev Gymnasium. Beginning in 1908 he studied in Saint Petersburg from 1908, graduating in 1909. Beginning in 1915 he studied at the historical-philological department of Petrograd Imperial University, where I. M. Grevs was his teacher. After graduating university, Antsiferov remained in the department of general history until 1919.

His pedagogical career began directly after his university graduation: the women's gymnasium of N. N. Zvorskaya (1915–1916), the private school of A. S. Cherniaev (1915–1918), a school at the former Tenishevsii college (1918–1925), where he led a humanitarian circle, at the second pedagogical institute (1919–1926), in a boarding school for street children in Pavlovsk (1919–1920) at the Institute of Art History (1925–1929).

In 1917 he wrote in his diary:

17 October. It is dark and crowded on the streets. It is terrible to look at them. Each coming day brings blood. The Bolsheviks forge their uprising and we await it obediently like a force of fate.
24 October. A new act is beginning in a cruel Russian tragedy.
25 October. The October Revolution. Difficult thoughts wander in my soul like clouds. Love for human personality and faith in the eternal remain. I see that this does not depend on any kind of event.

He participated in the religious-philosophical circles of A. A. Meyer "Tuesday" and "Sunday" (1918–1925). He led seminars on the study of Petersburg and Pavlovsk, gave lectures, led excursions around the city and suburbs, collaborated with the journals "Pedagogical Thought" (1918–1924) and "Tour Business" (1821-1923). In 1921, on I. M. Grevets' initiative, the Petrograd Scientific-research excursion institute opened, which was located in building 3 on Simeonovskaia (now Belinskii) Street. Antsiferov participated in historical and methodological sections, led seminars: "Collection and grouping of literary material for the compilation of anthologies in St. Petersburg" "The City from a touring point of view" and "Summer Seminar on Tsarskoe Tselo." After the liquidation of the Tour Institute in September 1924, he moved to the Petrograd branch of the Central Regional Studies Bureau (TsBK) formed in January 1922.

=== Imprisonment and release ===
In the spring of 1925 he was arrested, sentenced to three years exile, and sent to Omsk, but after three months was freed and returned to Leningrad.

On the night of April 23, 1929 he was arrested as a participant in the "counter-revolutionary monarchist organization" called Voskresen'e. On July 22, 1929 he was sentenced to three years in the labor camps and in August was sent to the Solovki prison camp. On May 3, 1930 he was arrested in the camp as a "participant of a counter-revolutionary organization" and sent in isolation to the Sekirnaia Mountain in the Solovetsky Islands and for further investigation was sent to Leningrad. On June 20 his camp term was increased by a year and he was sent back to the Solovetsky Islands.

In the summer of 1930 he was sent to Leningrad and subject to investigation by the Academy of Sciences. On August 23, 1931 he was sentenced to five years in the labor camps and sent to Belbaltlag. In the fall of 1933 he was freed from the camp and returned to Leningrad.

He was arrested in September 1937, sentenced to 8 years in the labor camps on December 20 and sent to Bamlag. On December 2, 1939 he was freed from the camp. The case from October 29, 1929 was terminated following reevaluation.

He was accepted into the Writers' Union in 1943.

He died in Moscow and was buried in the Vagankovo Cemetery.

== Family ==
He married Tat'iana Nikolaevna Oberucheva (1890-1929), whom he met in Kiev, on February 5, 1914. Their children were: Natal'ia (1915–1924), Pavel (1918–1924), Sergei (1921–1942), Tat'iana(1924–2013).

== Academic activity ==
In 1944 he defended his dissertation at the Gorky Institute of World Literature for the degree of candidate of philological sciences on "The Problem of Urbanism in Fiction."

He authored a large number of works on the history of St. Petersburg, methodology, and the organization of excursions. He is known as the author of the memoir "From the Thoughts About the Past" published in 1992.

== Legacy ==
There was a reading of Antsiferov's works in Leningrad in 1989. In 1995 the Antsiferov Prize was established for better contemporary work on the city's history. The Moscow "Antsiferov Reading " took place in September 2012. In 2013 a street was built in the city of Pushkin and named Antsiferov Street.
