= Alyakhnovich =

Surname disambiguation page

Alyakhnovich (Belarusian: Аляхновіч, Lacinka: Aliachnovič) is a Belarusian surname, and may refer to:

- Frantsishak Alyakhnovich (1883–1944), Belarusian writer and journalist
- Edhar Alyakhnovich (born 1987), Belarusian professional footballer
