= Teodors Eihmans =

Soviet security officer and first Gulag administrator

- Фёдор Эйхманс
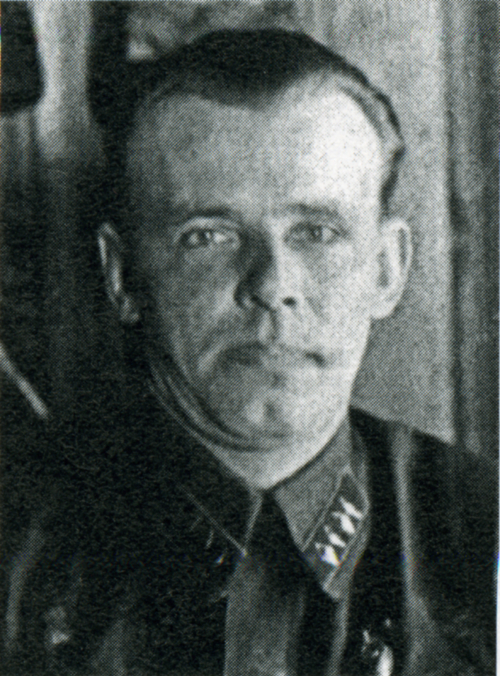
- Eikhmans in 1930

Head of the GULAG
- In office 25 April 1930 – 16 June 1930
- Preceded by: Position established
- Succeeded by: Lazar Iosifovich Kogan

Personal details
- Born: 25 April 1897 Courland Governorate, Russian Empire
- Died: 3 September 1938 (aged 41) Butovo firing range, Leninsky District, Moscow, Soviet Union
- Cause of death: Execution
- Citizenship: Soviet Union
- Party: All-Union Communist Party (Bolsheviks) (1917–1937)

Military service
- Allegiance: Russian Empire (1916–1917); Russian Soviet Federative Socialist Republic (1918–1922); Soviet Union (1922–1937)
- Branch/service: Imperial Russian Army; Cheka; GPU; OGPU; GUGB; NKVD
- Rank: Major of State Security
- Battles/wars: World War I Russian Civil War

Teodors Eihmans (Russian: Фёдор Ива́нович Э́йхманс, Feodor Ivanovich Eichmans; 25 April 1897 – 3 September 1938) was a Soviet security officer and first head of the Gulag (Main Directorate of Camps).

== Biography ==
Eihmans was born to a Latvian peasant family in the Courland Governorate.

He was a member of the Latvian Riflemen and served in World War I but was soon demobilized after he was in wounded in combat. He later worked as a mechanic in Petrograd, and in 1917 joined the Bolshevik Party. After the October Revolution, he worked as an agent in the Petrograd Cheka.

During the Russian Civil War, Eihmans was transferred to Central Asia and became head of the Kazaly branch of the Cheka. He also was active in the Civil War in Turkestan and worked as an assistant to Gleb Bokii.

After the Civil War, he became head of the Solovki prison camp, replacing Alexander Nogtev. The camp was primarily intended to hold socialist opposition to the new Soviet government.

From 25 April to 16 June 1930 Eihmans became the first head of the Camps Administration (ULag, was transformed in October of the same year into the OGPU-GULag). He was entrusted with the leadership of all the OGPU camps of that time.

In 1930 he organized the Vaygach expedition of the OGPU and until 1932 was its head. Officially, the expedition was engaged in the exploration and development of non-ferrous metal ores on the Vaygach Island and the coast of the Kara Sea.

From 1932 to 1937 he was deputy head of the 9th department (the head of the department was Gleb Bokii), and head of the 3rd department of the 9th department of the GUGB NKVD of the Soviet Union. It was a three-person department that conducted cipher work and managed cryptography, organized cipher communication with foreign missions of the USSR. At the same time, Eichmans was deputy chief of the Special Department.

In July 1937, Eihmans was arrested on accounts of Trotskyism and later shot on 3 September 1938 at the NKVD's Butovo firing range. He was rehabilitated on 25 July 1956.

== In fiction ==
The character of Eihmanis (sic!) in Zakhar Prilepin's 2014 novel The Monastery is based on Eihmans. In the novel's eight-part television adaptation, Eihmanis was played Sergey Bezrukov.
