= Vera Baltz =

Russian soil scientist (1866–1943)

Vera Aleksandrovna Balts
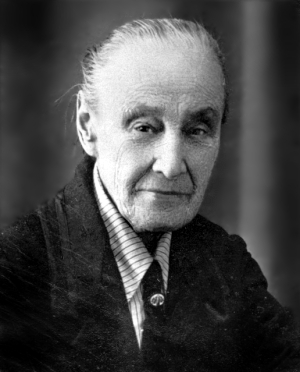
- Born: 3 August 1866; Saint Petersburg, Russian Empire
- Died: July 8, 1943 (aged 76); Syktyvkar, Soviet Union
- Other names: V.A. Baltz
- Occupation: Scientist
- Years active: 1908–1943

Vera Aleksandrovna Balts (3 August 1866 – 8 July 1943), sometimes published as V.A. Balts, or Baltz, was a Russian geologist and soil scientist. Balts was one of the first female soil scientists in Russia and later the Soviet Union, the latter of which suppressed her work.

== Biography ==
Balts was born in Saint Petersburg in 1866.

=== Education ===
In 1882 she graduated with a gold medal from the St. Petersburg Alexandrovskaya female gymnasium. She knew German, French and English. In 1894, the family moved to Warsaw, to the place of service of her father, General A.F. Balts (1841–1899), a high-ranking officer in the Imperial Russian Army.

Balts was educated at the Tenishevsky School in Saint Petersburg. She became interested in biology and the field of soil science, eventually working at the Soviet Academy of Sciences in Saint Petersburg and the V.V. Dokuchaev Central Museum of Soil. In the 1920s, she became the director of the Museum of Soil Science. Specializing in soil structure, engineering geology and road construction, she attended several international conferences of soil scientists in the late 1920s. She also published a number of scientific works during this time.

=== Arrest ===
In December 1930, Balts was arrested as part of a group of people considered to be antigovernmental agitators by the Soviet government. Although some authorities demanded her execution, she was sentenced to five years of forced labor at Solovki prison camp, where she was able to continue her work as a soil scientist. She even took part in the work of the Northern Base of the USSR Academy of Sciences for the study of tundra and peat bogs near Arkhangelsk.

Balts was released from prison in 1933 on account of her advanced age, though the Soviet government levied additional restrictions on her and suppressed her work. Balts then settled in Arkhangelsk with her niece, Leontina Arturovna, and her husband.

Balts and her family was eventually forced to move to Syktyvkar. After the ration card for her niece and family was stolen, Balts gave them hers. She died in 1943 of decompensated myocarditis brought on by starvation at 76.

== External source ==
- Prikhod’ko, V.E. Role of women in Russian soil science. Eurasian Soil Sc. 39, 342–343 (2006). https://doi.org/10.1134/S106422930603015X
