= Solovki prison camp =

First Gulag prison camp

Coordinates: 65°1′28″N 35°42′38″E

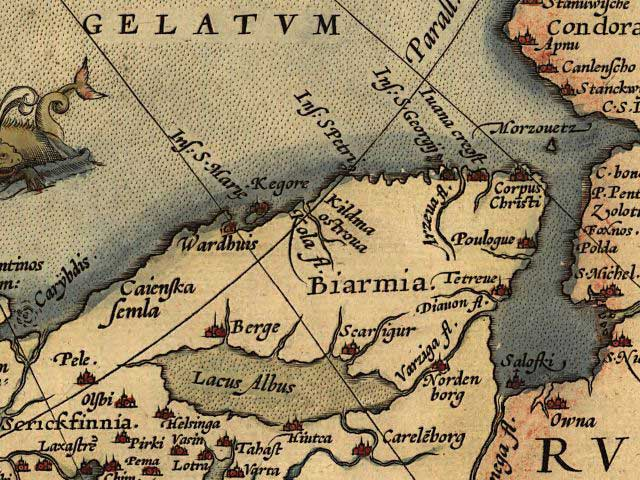
A 1570 map by Abraham Ortelius shows the location of "Salofki".

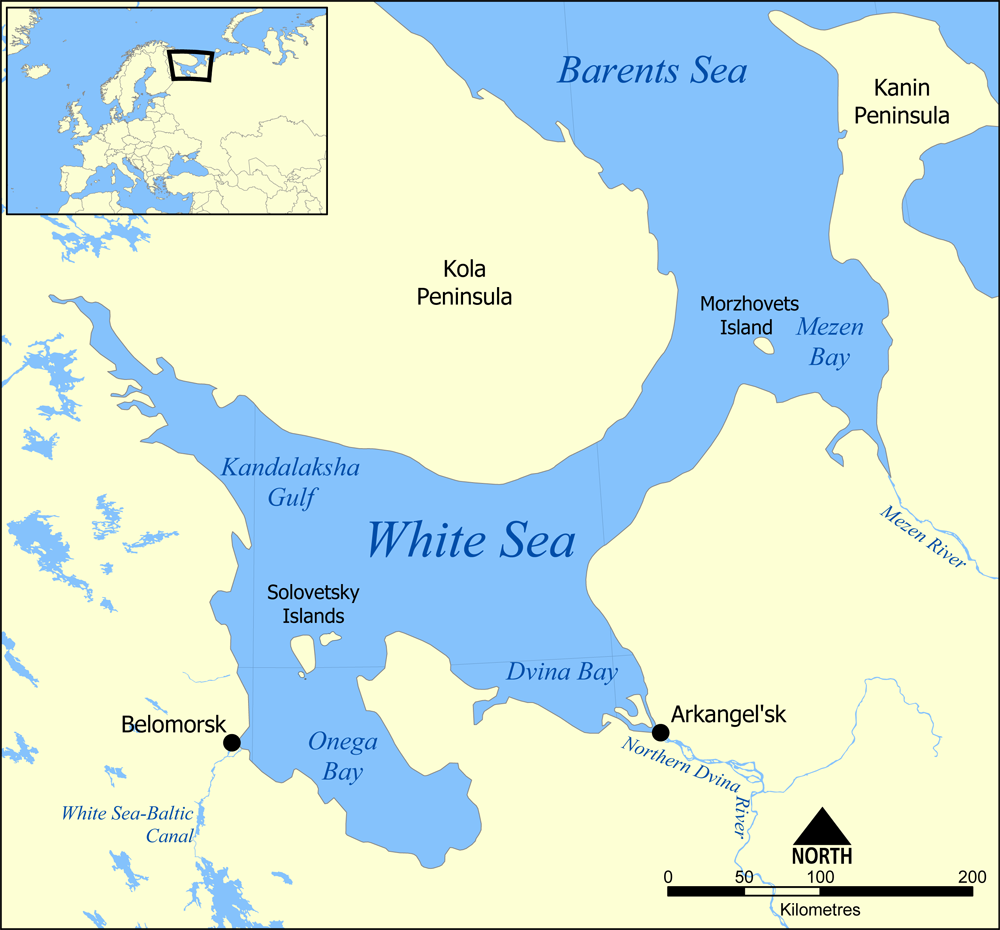
Solovetsky Islands on a map of the White Sea.

The Solovki special camp (later the Solovki special prison), (Note: Solovki special camp: Russian: Солове́цкий ла́герь осо́бого назначе́ния (СЛОН), also Solovki Corrective Labor Camp of OGPU: Солове́цкий ИТЛ ОГПУ (СЛАГ), later Solovki special prison: Солове́цкая тюрьма́ осо́бого назначе́ния (СТОН)) was set up in 1923 on the Solovetsky Islands in the White Sea as a remote and inaccessible place of detention, primarily intended for socialist opponents of Soviet Russia's new Bolshevik regime. At first, the anarchists, Mensheviks, and Socialist Revolutionaries enjoyed a special status there and were not made to work. Gradually, prisoners from the old regime (priests, gentry, and White Army officers) joined them and the guards and the ordinary criminals worked together to keep the "politicals" in order.

This was the nucleus from which the entire Gulag grew, thanks to its proximity to the first great construction project of the Five-Year Plans, the White Sea–Baltic Canal. In one way, Solovki and the White Sea Canal broke a basic rule of the Gulag: they were both far too close to the border. This facilitated a number of daring escapes in the 1920s; as war loomed in the late 1930s, it led to the closure of the Solovki special prison. Its several thousand inmates were transferred elsewhere, or shot on the mainland and on Solovki.

In common parlance, the word "Solovki" initially referred to the Solovetsky Islands or the Solovetsky Monastery, but since these times it came to denote the Solovki prison camp.

== History ==
=== From monastery to concentration camp ===
Historically, the Solovetsky Islands were the location of the famous Russian Orthodox Solovetsky Monastery complex. It was a centre of economic activity with over three hundred monks, and also a forepost of Russian naval power in the North, repelling foreign attacks during the Time of Troubles, the Crimean War, and the Russian Civil War.

Solovki were used as a concentration camp as early as in 1919 by the anti-Bolshevik Provisional Government of the Northern Region. In 1920 the area was seized by the Bolsheviks and they re-used the area for the POW camp of the prisoners in Russian Civil War. In 1922 Solovki were designated as a place for exile of "socially undesirabes". In May 1923 Iosif Unshlikht proposed the creation of a forced labor camp on Solovki for political and criminal prisoners. The first shipload of 300 prisoners was delivered from Arkhangelsk and Pertominsk concentration camps on the ship Pechora on June 6 1923.

The secret decree of 2 November 1923 led to the conversion of the monastery into the Solovki "special" camp: the Solovetsky lager osobogo naznachenia or SLON in Russian (the acronym is a play on the Russian word for elephant). One of the first "forced labor camps", Solovki served as a prototype for the Gulag as a whole. In early 1924, it was sometimes given a double name, Severnye (Solovetskiye) Lagerya OGPU (Northern (Solovki) camps of OGPU).

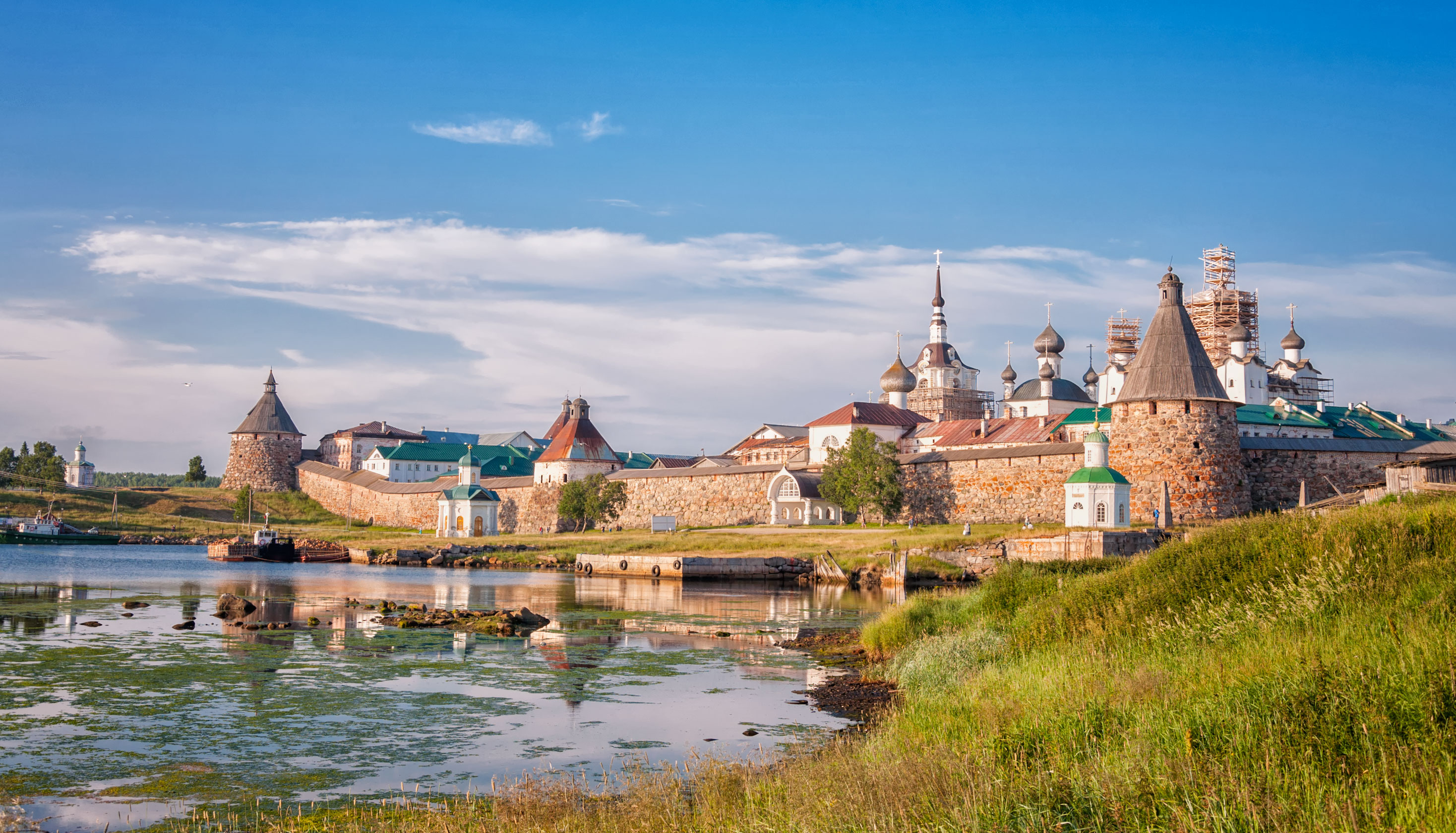
Solovetsky Monastery in 2013

Its remote situation made escape almost impossible and in Tsarist times the monastery had been used, on occasion, as a political prison by the Russian imperial administration. The treatment of the prisoners in the Soviet-era camp attracted much criticism in Western Europe and the United States after a book came out in England, An Island Hell, by S. A. Malsagoff. After a thorough clean-up and careful staging, the Soviet government sent the proletarian writer Maxim Gorky there in an attempt to counter this negative publicity. He wrote a very favourable essay, which praised the beauty of nature on the islands, but some authors believe he understood the real conditions he was witnessing.

=== The Baltic-White Sea Canal ===
The exact number of prisoners sent to Solovki from 1923 to the closure of its penitentiary facilities in 1939 is unknown. Estimates range between tens and hundreds of thousands.

In 1923, Soloviki contained "no more than 3,000" prisoners; by 1930, the number had jumped to "about 50,000", with another 30,000 held on the mainland at the nearest railhead of Kem. In the early 1930s, many of the prisoners from the camp were transferred to the newly established Belbaltlag to man the construction of the White Sea – Baltic Canal.

=== A Special Prison, 1936–1939 ===
In 1936, the Solovki camp was renamed a "special" prison (SLON, an acronym that means "Elephant" in Russian) and from then until its closure in 1939 it served as a holding area for many prisoners subsequently executed, there or on the mainland, during the Great Terror of 1937–1938.

Until documents confirming their execution were found in 1996, it was long thought that a transport of over one thousand prisoners, a quota for "1st category arrests" (executions), died from drowning after the barges on which they were travelling were deliberately sunk in the White Sea. It is now known that they were shot on the mainland in late October and early November 1937; subsequent quotas for execution came too late in the year to sail across the White Sea and were shot on the islands, near Sekirnaya Hill.

All but five of the 1,116 prisoners sent from Solovki across the White Sea on 27 October 1937 were executed by NKVD Captain and senior executioner Mikhail Matveyev at Sandarmokh between that date and 10 November 1937, when he reported his task complete. Among those killed were 289 members of the Ukrainian intelligentsia, the Executed Renaissance.

A further transport was prepared to sail to the mainland for execution, but it was too late in the year to cross the frozen sea. Instead, between 200 and 300 prisoners were shot on Solovki itself, near the Sekirnaya Hill. One of the many victims was Yelizaveta Katz, an engineer, who was 8 months pregnant. She was due to be shot with the others on 17 February 1938, but was allowed to give birth, then shot three months later on 16 May, aged 28.

In 1939, the prison was closed. It was situated too close to the border with Finland, and the Second World War was imminent. The buildings were transformed into a naval base and a cadet corps was deployed there. (One of its students was the future author Valentin Pikul.)

=== World Heritage and a disputed legacy ===
In 1989, a permanent exhibition, "The Solovki special camp", was added to the museum on the islands, the first anywhere in the USSR to be devoted to the Gulag. In June of that year, the first Days of Remembrance for Victims of Political Repression were held on the islands; in subsequent years this event would take place in August.

The Orthodox Church reestablished the monastery in 1992, and that year the ensemble was added to UNESCO's World Heritage List.

Between 1989 and 2014 a memorial square including memorials to different victims who were imprisoned in the special camp and prison was created.

In 2015, human rights activists expressed disquiet that the authorities were "gradually removing all traces of the labor camp". In January 2016 the Gulag section in the Solovki Museum was closed by its new director, Vladimir Shutov who, as Archimandrite Porfiry, was head of the monastery.

In August 2017, the local authorities asked police to investigate the 29th annual Days of Remembrance as an "unauthorised" gathering. Early in 2018, a court in the Arkhangelsk Region heard an unsuccessful plea by Archimandrite Porfiry to annul a contract concluded in 2011 with the head of the now disbanded Gulag section of the museum and evict its former head, Olga Bochkaryova, and her daughter from their two-room apartment.

The author of several books about Solovki, Yury Brodsky, was accused by an Orthodox website of displaying "religious hatred" in his latest publication.

== Notable prisoners ==
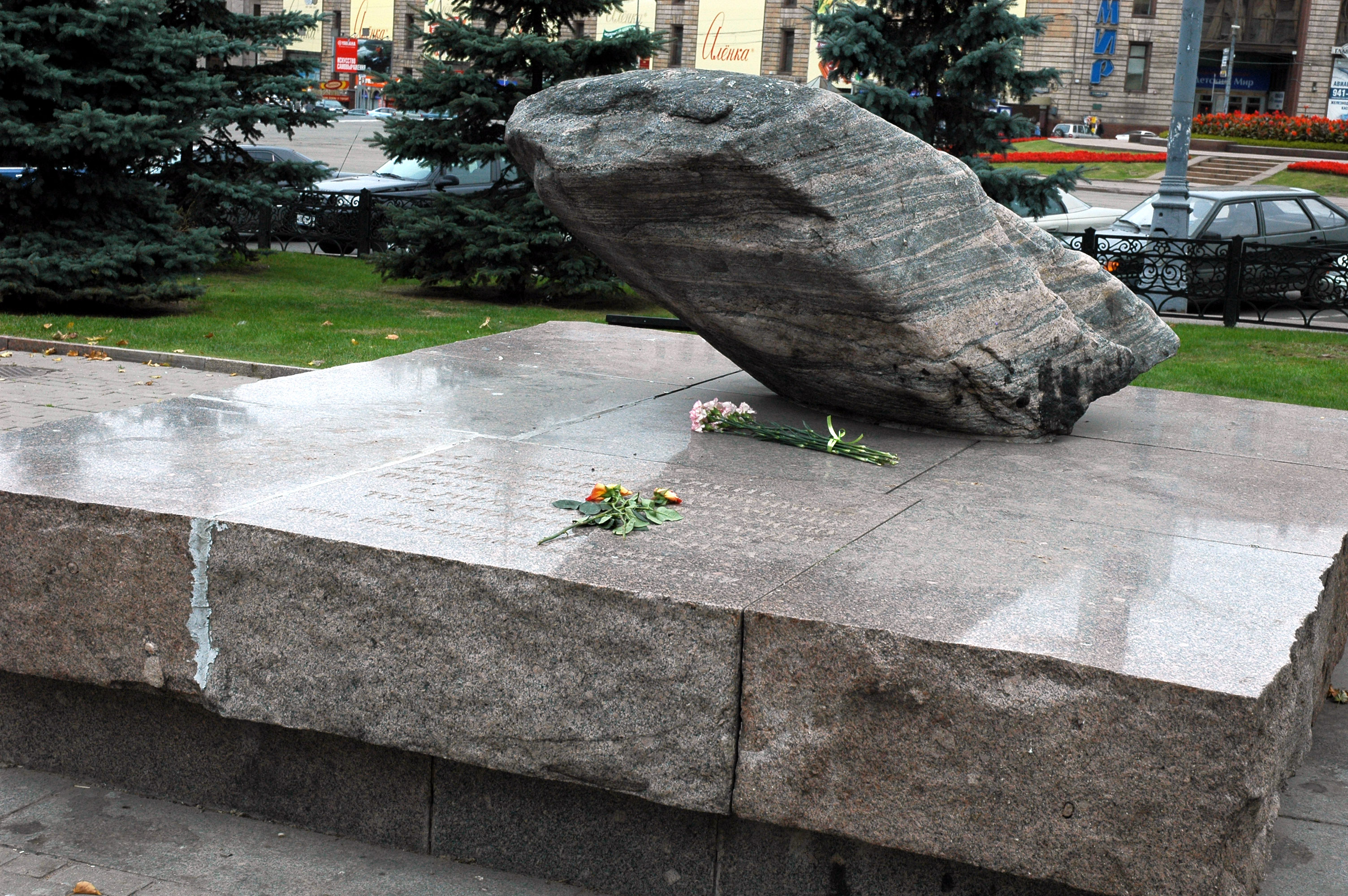
Memorial to the victims of political repression in the USSR, on Lubyanka Square, Moscow, next to FSB headquarters, made of a boulder from the Solovetsky Islands

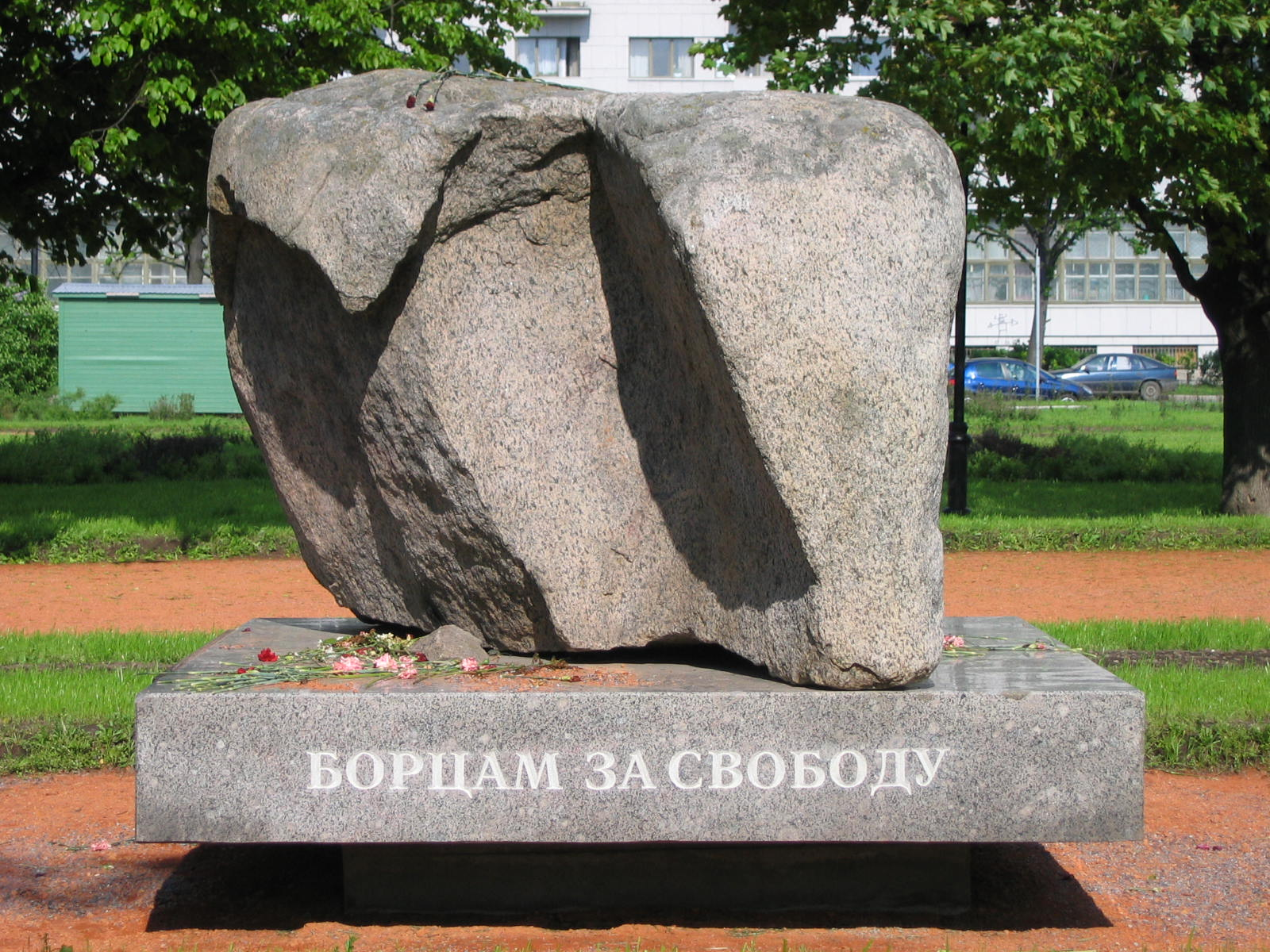
Memorial to the victims of political repression in the USSR, in St. Petersburg, made of a boulder from the Solovetsky Islands

Members of the intelligentsia, representing both Tsarist Russia and the post-revolutionary USSR, were prominent among the prisoners on Solovki.

=== The 1920s ===
In the 1920s many of those sent to Solovki were released, but often arrested and imprisoned (or exiled) a second time.

- Frantsishak Alyakhnovich, Belarusian writer, a citizen of interwar Poland, who wrote the first book-length witness-account about Gulag, titled, In the Claws of the GPU; imprisoned 1927–1933, in 1933 exchanged with Poland for Branislaw Tarashkyevich.
- Vladimir Artemyev, inventor: imprisoned 1923–1925
- Osip Braz, Russian-Jewish realist painter: imprisoned 1924–1926
- Boris Shiriaev writer, author of La veilleuse de Solovki - 1889 - 1959 imprisoned in 1923
- Leonid Feodorov, Bishop and Exarch of the Russian Greek Catholic Church: imprisoned 1923–1929
- Konstantine Gamsakhurdia, Georgian writer: imprisoned mid-1920s
- G.J.Gordon, historian
- Yuri Bezsonov, cavalry commander, one of the very few people who succeeded in escaping the camp
- Alexander K. Gorsky, poet: sent to Solovki (?) in 1929
- Jamo bey Hajinski, State Controller and Minister of Transportation, Postal Service and Telegraph of Azerbaijan Democratic Republic: imprisoned 1925–1928
- Aliafsar Najafov, secretary of the chancellery office of the Council of Ministers of the Azerbaijan Democratic Republic: imprisoned 1927-1929, died during a hunger strike
- Archimandrite Illarion (Troitsky), Professor of the Moscow Theological Academy: imprisoned 1924–1929
- Ivan V. Popov, Professor of the Moscow Theological Academy: imprisoned 1925-1927
- Nikolay N. Vinogradov, historian and ethnographer: imprisoned 1925–1928, shot at Sandarmokh on 8 January 1938, aged 61

=== The First Five-Year Plan, 1928–1932 ===
Naftaly Frenkel was a prisoner on Solovki who became a leading cadre in the security services during the First Five-Year Plan.

Arrested by the OGPU in 1923, he was sentenced to ten years imprisonment and sent to Solovki. There his sentence was reduced and in 1927, he was released and appointed head of production at SLON before being sent as representative of the camp to Moscow in 1929. Soon he was in charge of production throughout the Gulag and oversaw work on the White Sea Canal. His activities in the Gulag paralleled the forced industrialisation and collectivisation of agriculture throughout the Soviet Union.

The mass shooting on Solovki in 1929 described by Dmitry Sergeyevich Likhachov (it forms a key episode in Marina Goldovskaya's 1987 film, Solovki Power) was a sign of the harshening regime.

- Nikolai Antsiferov, historian: imprisoned 1929–1933
- Academician Dmitry Likhachov, philologist: imprisoned 1928–1931, then worked on White Sea Canal until 1932
- Vladimir V. Tchernavin, ichthyologist: imprisoned 1931, then transferred to Kem. From Kem he escaped to the West and wrote about his experiences in his book, I Speak for the Silent Prisoners of the Soviets.
- Vladimir N. Beneshevich, historian, paleographer: imprisoned 1928–1933
- Oleg V. Volkov, writer: imprisoned 1928–1929, 1931–1936
- Mirjaqip Dulatuli, Kazakh writer: imprisoned 1928–1935 (died in Solovki)
- Klym Polishchuk, Ukrainian journalist, poet and writer sentenced for 10 years in 1929, executed in 1937
- Vera Baltz, Russian soil scientist, sentenced for 5 years in 1930, released early in 1933 on account of age
- Evgenia Iaroslavskaia-Markon, Russian journalist and anarchist, sentenced for 3 years in 1930, executed in 1931.
- Oleg Vasilyevich Volkov, Russian writer and translator, sentenced for 3 years in 1928 but released in 1929 and sent into inner exile.

=== The mid- to late 1930s ===
Many of those on Solovki later in the 1930s fell victim to Stalin's Great Purge and were shot, either in autumn 1937 at Sandarmokh or on Solovki in February 1938.

- A.V.Bobrishchev-Pushkin, lawyer and activist of the Smenovekhovtsy, a descendant of Decembrist Pavel Sergeyevich Bobrishchev-Pushkin: imprisoned 1934–1937, shot at Sandarmokh on 27 October 1937, aged 61
- Pavel Florensky, priest, scientist, encyclopaedist: imprisoned 1934–1937, shot at unknown location
- Nariman bey Narimanbeyov, State Controller of Azerbaijan Democratic Republic (1918-1920): died on Solovki in 1937, aged 48 (shot?)
- Hanna Malm, Finnish communist, imprisoned 1935, drowned herself 8 August 1937
- Karlo Štajner, a Yugoslavian communist: imprisoned 1937–1939
- Mark Voronoi, Ukrainian poet: imprisoned 1937, shot at Sandarmokh on 3 November 1937, aged 33
- Hamid bey Shahtakhtinski, Minister of Education and Religious Affairs of Azerbaijan Democratic Republic (1918–1920): imprisoned 1941–1944 when he died.

== Camp commanders ==
- October 13, 1923 to November 13, 1925 – Alexander Nogtev
- November 13, 1925 to May 20, 1929 – Fedor Eichmans
- May 20, 1929 to May 19, 1930 ‌– Alexander Nogtev
- May 19, 1930 to September 25, 1931 – Andrei Ivanchenko
- September 25, 1931 to November 6, 1931 – K. Y. Dukis (acting)
- November 6-16, 1931 – E. I. Senkevich
- November 16, 1931 to January 1, 1932 the camp was closed due to the organization of the Belbaltlag on its base
- January 1932 to March 1933 – E. I. Senkevich
- August 27, 1932 – P. A. Boyar (mentioned as temporarily acting chief)
- January 28, 1933 to no later than August 13, 1933 (mentioned) – Yakov Bukhband
- October 8, 1933 – Levlev (mentioned as temporary acting chief)
- December 4, 1933 – the camp as an independent unit is closed

== The prison on Solovki in art and literature ==
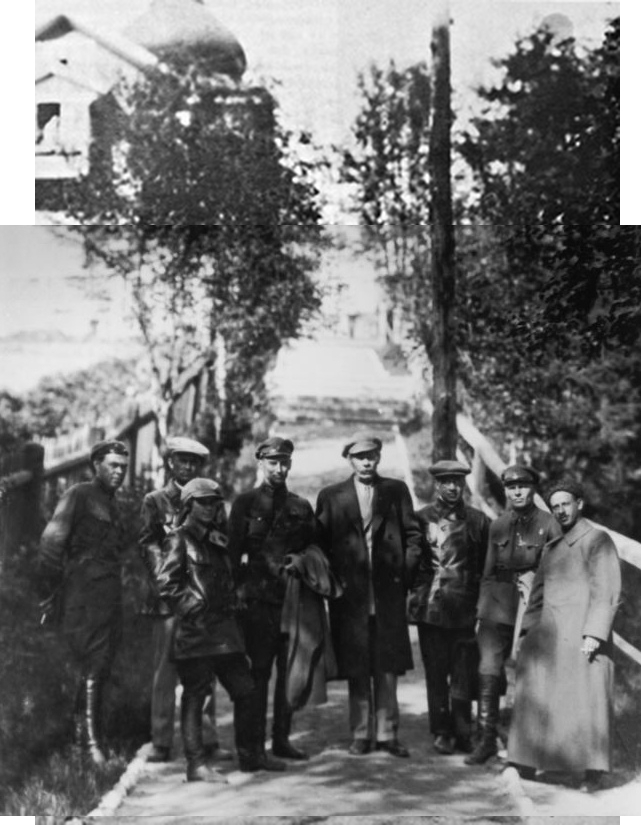
Maxim Gorky visiting Solovki. To his right stands leading NKVD officer Gleb Boky

=== Émigré and samizdat literature, 1926-1974 ===
- Sozerko Malsagov: Malsagoff, S.A. (1926). An Island Hell: a Soviet prison in the Far North. London: A.M. Philpot. The first memoir about Solovki was by S.A. Malsagoff, a North Caucasian prisoner, who escaped after a year on the islands.
- Yury Bezsonov: Bessonov, J.D. (1929). My 26 prisons and my escape from Solovetsky. London: Jonathan Cape.
- Tchernavin, Vladimir V. (1934). I speak for the silent prisoners of the Soviets. Tchernavin was a prisoner in the camp in the early 1930s. He described his experiences there in his book, published after his escape abroad.
- The fictional town of Solovets in the Strugatsky brothers' popular Monday Begins on Saturday (1965) is an allusion to the Solovetsky Monastery.
- Aleksandr Solzhenitsyn (1975). The Gulag Archipelago. Collins & Harvill Press. Solzhenitsyn spends an entire chapter of Volume 2 discussing the development of Solovki and conditions there during the early years of the Soviet regime.
- Boris Shirayev, author of La veilleuse de Solovki described the birth of the first gulag in 1923, the date when he was imprisoned. He described the daily routine and the socio-cultural multitude of the prisoners.

=== Perestroika and Glasnost, 1985-1991 ===
- Marina Goldovskaya's 1988 documentary film The Solovki Regime («Власть Соловецкая») tells the story of the first, permanent camp in Soviet Russia, from its founding in 1923 to the closure of the prison in 1939. It includes interviews with former prisoners, among them mediaevalist Dmitry Likhachyov, writer Oleg Volkov and long-term Gulag inmate Olga Adamova-Sliozberg (one of the four named sources in Solzhenitsyn's Gulag Archipelago, the rest were anonymous until 1994).
- Vilensky, Simeon, ed. (1999). Till my Tale is Told: women's memoirs of the Gulag. Bloomington: Indiana University Press. ISBN 0-253-33464-0. Abridged version of the 1989 Soviet original («Доднесь тяготеет. т. 1. Записки Вашей современницы»). Includes two key memoirs describing the early and final stages of the camp's existence (see Memoirs, below).
- Yugoslav communist Karlo Štajner served a part of his sentence on Solovki. He recounts his experiences there in 7,000 days in Siberia (English edn. 1989).

=== Post-Perestroika ===
- Zakhar Prilepin's The Abode is a 2014 novel reconstructing life in the Solovki labor camp of the 1920s. In 2020, it inspired an eight-part television adaptation.

== Further reading (in order of publication) ==
=== Memoirs ===
- Malsagov, S. A. (1926). Island Hell: A Soviet Prison in the Far North. London: Philpot. OCLC 4077341.
- Francišak Aljachnovič (1934) In the Claws of the GPU
- Tchernavin, Vladimir V. (1935), I Speak for the Silent: Prisoners of the Soviets. Boston: Hale, Cushman, and Flint.
- Babina-Nevskaya, Berta (1999). "My First Prison, February 1922". Till My Tale is Told: 97–111. Excerpt from memoir written in 1970s by a Left Social-Revolutionary (tr. John Crowfoot)
- Adamova-Sliozberg, Olga (1999). "My Journey". Till My Tale is Told: 28–34. Excerpt from memoir written in 1940s and 1950s by a repentant non-Party communist (translated by Sally Laird)
- Sliozberg, Olga Adamova (2011), My Journey: How one woman survived Stalin's Gulag, Northwestern University Press: Evanston, Ill. (The full unabridged memoir, translated by Katharine Gratwick Baker.)

=== Novels ===
- Rolin, Olivier (2014). Le Météorologue. France: Seuil Paulsen. ISBN 978-2-02-116888-4. OCLC 986836896.

=== Studies ===
- Ascher, Abraham (July 1969). "The Solovki prisoners, the Mensheviks and the Socialist International". Slavonic and East European Review. 47 (109): 423–435.
- Michael Jakobson (1993), Origins of the GULAG: The Soviet Prison Camp System, 1917–1934. Lexington, KY: University Press of Kentucky.
- Galina Mikhaĭlovna Ivanova, Carol Apollonio Flath, and Donald J. Raleigh (2000), Labor Camp Socialism: The Gulag in the Soviet Totalitarian System. New York: M.E. Sharpe.
- Baron, Nick (Jan–Mar 2002). "Production and terror: the operation of the Karelian Gulag, 1933-1938". Cahiers du monde russe. 43 (1): 139–180.
- Roy P. Robson (2004), Solovki: The Story of Russia Told Through its Most Remarkable Islands. Cambridge, MA: Yale University Press.
- Shubin, Daniel H. Monastery Prisons, ISBN 978-1365413582
