= The Monastery (Prilepin novel) =

2014 novel by Zakhar Prilepin

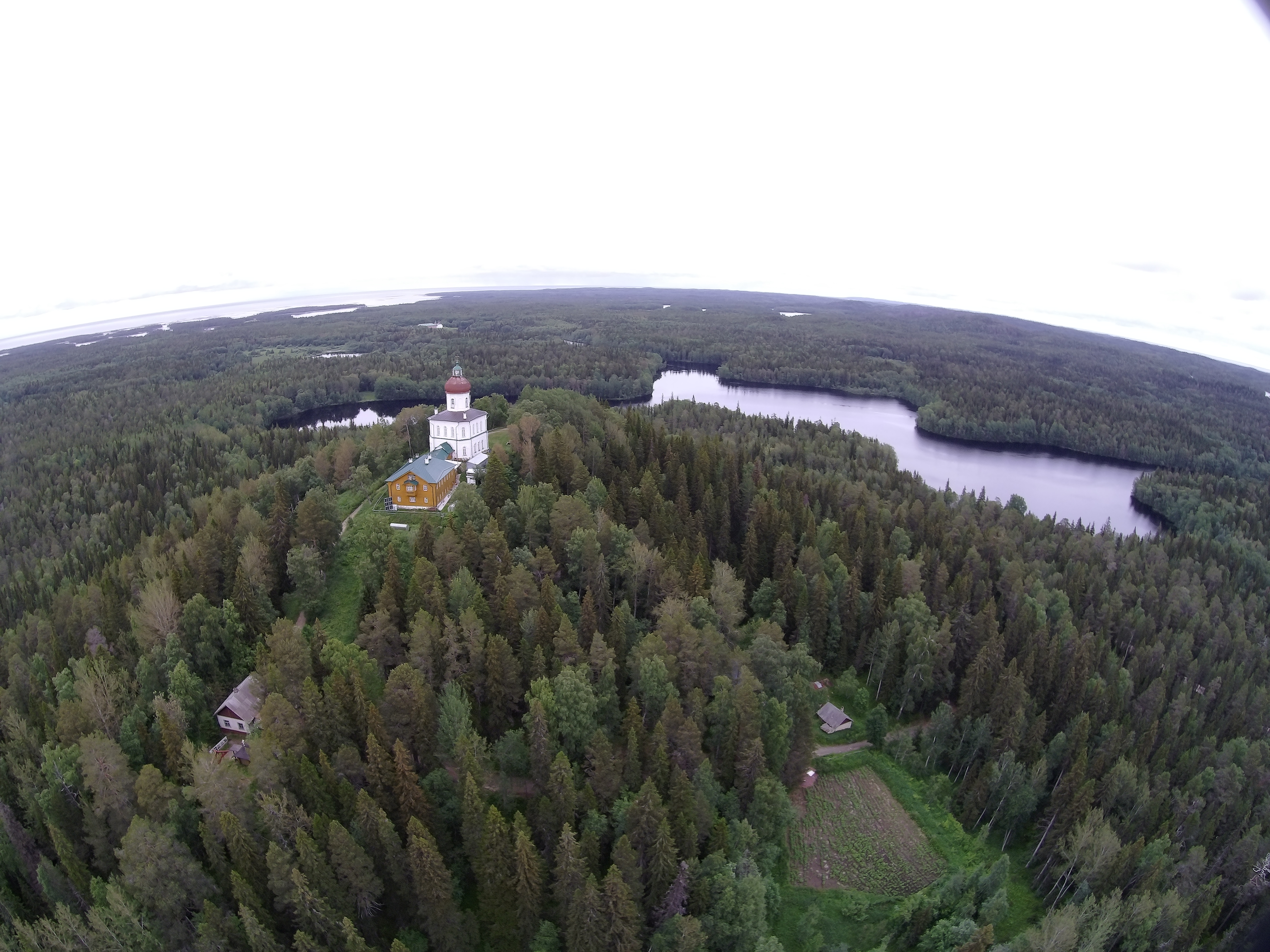
- The Sekirnaya Hill, where parts of the novel are set
- Author: Zakhar Prilepin
- Original title: Обитель
- Translator: Nicholas Kotar
- Language: Russian
- Publisher: AST
- Publication date: 2014
- Publication place: Russia
- English publication date: 2020

The Monastery (Russian: Обитель, lit. 'The Abode') is a historical novel by Russian writer Zakhar Prilepin, depicting life inside the Solovki prison camp on the Solovki Islands in the White Sea at the end of the 1920s. It was published in 2014 by the AST publishing house, and in 2020 inspired Alexander Veledinsky to film an eight-part television adaptation starring Sergey Bezrukov.

The Monastery became Prilepin's best-selling book, earning him the Big Book National Literary Award (for the 2013–2014 season) and the Russian Government Prize in the Field of Culture (2016). It has been translated into many languages, including English.

== Plot ==
The novel tells a tragic story of human fates crushed in the grinding wheels of the Soviet repressive system. At its center stands Artyom Goryainov, a young man imprisoned in the Solovetsky Special Purpose Camp (known as SLON) in the late 1920s.

Clever and self-reliant, Artyom quickly learns the harsh rules of survival from an old inmate, Vasily Petrovich. Thrown into a strange community of convicts — from refined intellectuals and former bishops to murderers and thieves — he faces brutal labor, cruelty, and arbitrary violence. Thanks to his flexible nature and a transfer to the camp's privileged sports unit, Artyom gains access to the relatively "elite" life of the camp intelligentsia. He even meets the camp commandant, Eikhmanis, an encounter that deepens his inner turmoil and moral doubts.

The second part of the book marks a sharp turning point. After a failed assassination attempt on Eikhmanis, he is replaced by the sadistic Nogtev, and the camp's brief period of relative freedom gives way to open terror. When an escape plot is uncovered, the iron fist of repression falls on Artyom himself: he is beaten and thrown into the dreaded punishment cells on Sekirnaya Hill. There, he witnesses both the spiritual strength of some prisoners — like Bishop Ioann — and the moral collapse of others. The emotional core of the novel is the scene of a collective confession, conducted by Bishop Ioann, among the inmates of the infamous isolation cell on Sekirnaya Hill.

The story reaches its climax in Artyom's desperate attempt to escape with Galina, an investigator who is also his secret lover. Their plan to flee the Solovki Islands by motorboat collapses amid misfortune and mutual reproaches, and Artyom comes to realize that their love has died. Both return to the camp, where sweeping purges are already underway: the new authorities arrest the former administration, giving Artyom a chance to take revenge on his old tormentors. By the end, he is spiritually broken and hollowed out by all he has endured. He loses his will to live, turns toward God, and is ready to face execution — only to learn it was a cruel mockery staged by Nogtev.

In the epilogue, the narrator, living in the early 21st century, receives (from Eikhmanis's daughter) Galina's diary, which sheds light on her romance with the commandant (a source of great suffering for her) and explains the real motives behind some of her actions. The final notes outline the fates of the main characters: Artyom is murdered by criminals, Eikhmanis is executed, and Galina receives amnesty.

== Historical background ==
Prilepin recalls that he spent years preparing to write this long novel (nearly 800 pages), immersing himself in every available source about SLON: “I turned my home into a library of the Solovetsky Monastery,” he said.

The author cautions against equating the 1920s "experimental" camp with the later Gulag system portrayed by Shalamov and Solzhenitsyn. Most of the novel's characters are based on real historical figures, though their names are often altered. For example, the first commandants of the Solovki camp were in fact named Alexander Nogtev and Teodors Eihmans (rather than Eikhmanis).

== Criticism ==
The novel was generally well received by literary critics in Russia but was ignored by English-speaking critics. A critical note on the Polka literary site reads:

An artistic reconstruction of life in the Solovki labor camp of the 1920s. In The Abode, the camp is not merely a place of punishment, but a state within a state — a miniature model of the entire country, where the line between executioners and victims is less clear than it seems. Prilepin crafts a sweeping, intricately structured adventure novel with dozens of characters, portraying the camp from an unexpected angle: alongside deadly labor, hunger, and executions, there is also an orchestra and a museum; prisoners attend the theater and occasionally hold tea parties. For Prilepin, the cycle of suffering and torment is not an unspeakable crime to be condemned and overcome, but rather a paradoxical and thorny Russian path toward holiness — and it is no coincidence that the Solovki camp occupies the walls of a former monastery.
