= In the Claws of the GPU =

1935 book by Francišak Aljachnovič

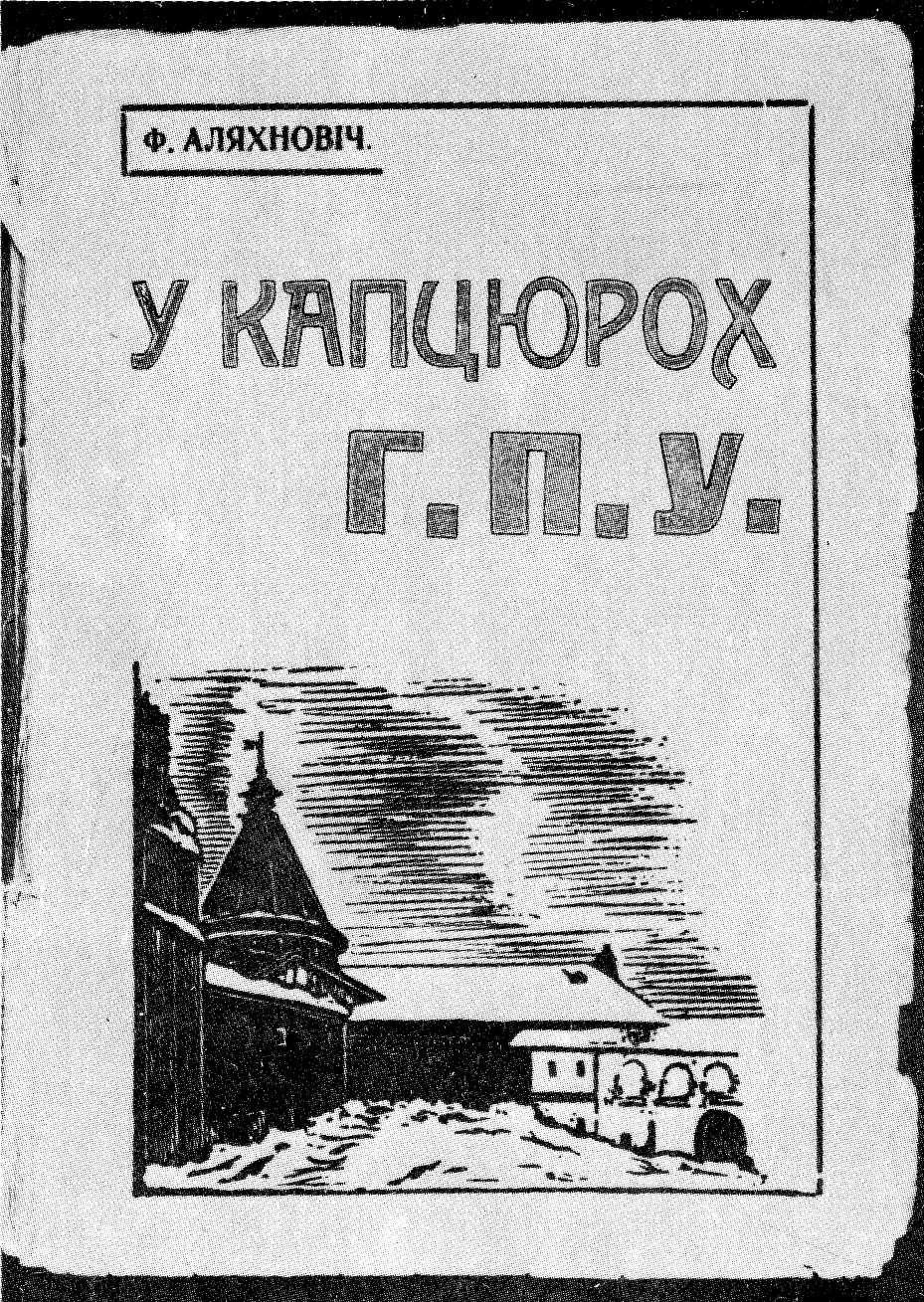
- Front cover, 1937 Belarusian-language edition
- Author: Francišak Aljachnovič
- Original title: Siedem lat w szponach GPU (Polish) / У капцюрох Г.П.У. (Belarusian)
- Genre: Memoir
- Publication date: Polish (1935), Belarusian (1937)
- Publication place: Poland
- Media type: Print (Hardcover, Paperback)

In the Claws of the GPU (Belarusian: У капцюрох ГПУ, romanized: U kapciuroch HPU; Polish: Siedem lat w szponach GPU) (Note: GPU is an abbreviation of the State Political Directorate) is an early book-length eyewitness account of the Soviet Gulag. It was written by Francišak Aljachnovič, a Belarusian playwright, nationalist, and citizen of the Second Polish Republic (in Polish documents, his name is spelled Franciszek Olechnowicz). After his release from Gulag and return to Poland in 1933, Aljachnovič immediately wrote the book in three language versions, namely, in Belarusian, Polish, and Russian. In 1934 the Polish version was serialized in the daily Słowo, published in Wilno. In 1934-1935 the Russian-language version (in pre-1917 orthography) was serialized in the White émigré newspapers Vozrozhdenie in Paris, and in Nash put' in Harbin, Manchukuo.

== Publication history ==
In Polish:

- Franciszek Olechnowicz. 1935. Siedem lat w szponach GPU [Seven Years in the Claws of the GPU]. Wilno [Vilnius]: Nakładem autora [At Author's Expense].
- Franciszek Olechnowicz. 1937. Prawda o Sowietach (wrażenia z 7-letniego pobytu w więzieniach sowieckich r. 1927-1934) [The Truth about the Soviet Union: Experiences from the Seven-Year-Long Incarceration in Soviet Prisons, 1927-1934]. Warsaw: Nakładem autora [At Author's Expense], 152pp.
- Franciszek Olechnowicz. 1938. Prawda o Sowietach (wrażenia z 7-letniego pobytu w więzieniach sowieckich r. 1927-1933) [The Truth about the Soviet Union: Experiences from the Seven-Year-Long Incarceration in Soviet Prisons, 1927-1933] (Ser: Biblioteka Osadnika, Vol. 4). Kurytyba [Curitiba, Brazil]: Nakład i druk Gazety Polskiej w Brazylii [Published and printed by the Gazeta Polska w Brazylii], 155pp.
- Franciszek Olechnowicz. 1990. 7 lat w szponach GPU [7 Years in the Claws of the GPU]. Warsaw: Centrum Informacyjno-Reklamowe (CIR). 167pp. ISBN 8385154094.

In Belarusian:

- Францішак Аляхновіч. 1937. У капцюрох Г.П.У. Вільня: выданне аўтара. Francišak Aliachnovič. 1937. U kapciuroch H.P.U. [In the Claws of the GPU]. Vilnia: vydannie aŭtara [Vilnius: Published by the Author], 159pp.
- Францішак Аляхновіч. 1941–1942. У капцюрох ГПУ. In the newspaper Мiнская прауда. Nos> 1941: 7–12, 14–17, 19; 1942: 1, 2, 4, 6, 7, 9–12, 14, 15, 17, 18, 21, 22, 24, 25, 29, 31, 32, 36, 37, 39, 41.
- Францішак Аляхновіч. 1991. У капцюрох ГПУ. In the periodical Полымя, No 1, pp. 151–214.
- Францішак Аляхновіч. 1994. У капцюрох Г.П.У. Аповесць. Мінск: Мастацка література. Francišak Aliachnovič. 1994. U kapciuroch H.P.U. Apoviesć [In the Claws of the GPU: A Tale]. Minsk: Mastacka litieratura, 238pp. ISBN 5-340-01311-1.
- Францішак Аляхновіч. 2005. У капцюрох ГПУ (pp 223–390). In: Ф. Аляхновiч. Выбраныя творы. Мінск: Беларускі Кнiгазбор. ISBN 9855040058.
- Францішак Аляхновіч. 2015. У капцюрох Г.П.У. Дакументальная аповесць (Серыя: Мая беларуская кніга). Мінск: Попурри. Francišak Aliachnovič. 2015. U kapciuroch H.P.U. Dakumientalnaja apoviesć (Sieryja: Maja bielaruskaja kniha) [In the Claws of the GPU: A Documentary Tale (Ser: My Belarusian Book)]. Minsk: Popurri, 288pp. ISBN 978-985-15-2429-3

== Translations ==
- Portuguese: Fr[anciszek] Olechnowicz. 1937. Sete Annos nas Garras Soviéticas (Verdade sobre os Soviets) [Seven Years in the Soviet Clutches (The Truth about the Soviets)] [translated from the Polish by Eva Wedber]. Rio de Janeiro: Amorim Cia Ltda and Livraria Moura, 190pp.
- Ukrainian: Францішек Аляхновіч. 1937. 7 літ на Соловках. Спомини білоруського діяча про миртиірольогію у Совітах. Львів: Накладом Видавничої Спілки "Діло" у Львові Frantsishek Alyakhnovich. 1937. 7 lit na Solovkakh. Spomyny bilorusʹkoho diyacha pro myrtyirolʹohiyu u Sovitakh [7 years in the Solovki {Gulag} Prison Camp: A Memoir of a Belarusian National Activist on the Sufferings and Martyrdom of Inmates in the Soviet Camps]. Lʹviv: Nakladom Vydavnychoyi Spilky "Dilo" u Lʹvovi, 168 pp.
- Italian: Franciszek Olechnowicz. 1938. La verità sulla Russia bolscevica. Impressioni di un russo-bianco nazionalista liberato dopo sette anni dalle prigioni dell'URSS [The Truth about Bolshevik Russia: Impressions of a Belarusian Nationalist Freed After Seven Years Spent in the Prisons of the USSR] [translated from the Polish by Gian d'Arce]. Firenze [Florence]: Nerbini, 60pp (large format, 28 cm).
- Russian: Франц Олехнович. 2012. В когтях ГПУ [In the Claws of the GPU] [пер. с белорус. Е. А. Тараса] (Серия: Неизвестная история). Минск: Харвест Frants Olekhnovich. 2012. V kogtiakh GPU [In the Claws of the GPU] [translated from the Belarusian by Ie. A. Taras] (Seriia: Neizvestnaia istoriia [Unknown History]). Minsk: Kharvest, 320pp. ISBN 9789851814707
- Russian: Франц Олехнович. 2012. В когтях ГПУ [In the Claws of the GPU] [пер. с белорус. Е. А. Тараса] (Серия: Неизвестная история). Рига: Институт беларуской истории и культуры Frants Olekhnovich. 2012. V kogtiakh GPU [In the Claws of the GPU] [translated from the Belarusian by Ie. A. Taras] (Seriia: Neizvestnaia istoriia [Unknown History]). Riga: Institut belaruskoi istorii i kul'tury, 319pp.

== See also ==
- Sozerko Malsagov, S. A. Malsagoff. 1926. An Island Hell: A Soviet Prison in the Far North {translated from the Russian by Francis Hamilton Lyon}. London: A. M. Philipot Ltd.
- A Travel to the Land Ze-Ka, a similar early Gulag memoir by a Polish citizen of the Jewish ethnicity, Julius Margolin, written in Russian, completed in 1947, published in 1949 in a French translation, and three years later (1952) in the Russian original in New York.
- A World Apart: The Journal of a Gulag Survivor, another Gulag memoir by a Polish citizen of Polish ethnicity, Gustaw Herling-Grudziński, written in Polish, completed in 1950, published in 1951 in an English translation in London, and two years later (1953), in the Polish original also in London.
- One Day in the Life of Ivan Denisovich, a fictionalised account of Gulag life by a Soviet citizen of Russian ethnicity, Aleksandr Solzhenitsyn, written in Russian, published in 1962 in Moscow, and the following year (1963) in an English translation in New York.
- Gulag: A History
