= Oleg Vasilyevich Volkov =

Russian writer (1900–1996)

Oleg Vasilyevich Volkov (Russian: Оле́г Васи́льевич Во́лков; 9 (21) January 1900, St. Petersburg – 10 February 1996, Moscow) was a Russian and Soviet writer, translator, social activist, conservationist and hunter.

Having written prose, memoirs, and short stories, he is best known for his autobiographical book A Journey into Darkness (Russian: Погружение во тьму), which unravels his personal history in the Soviet labor camp system, in which Volkov spent over 25 years of his life.

== Biography ==
Oleg Vasilyevich Volkov was born in 1900 in St. Petersburg to a wealthy aristocratic family. His father, Vasily Volkov, was an industrialist and landowner. His mother was the granddaughter of Russian admiral Andrei Lazarev, brother of the famous Russian admiral Mikhail Lazarev. Volkov received his education in the Tenischev Academy in St. Petersburg, where he was a classmate of the famous Russia-American writer Vladimir Nabokov.

In 1917 Volkov enrolled in the University of St. Petersburg, but did not become a student. According to some sources, between 1917 and 1919 Volkov lived in his family estate near Tver. According to other sources, he enrolled in the Tver Junker Academy. During the Russian civil war, Volkov served in a cavalry detachment of the White army. In the summer of 1918, the detachment made way to Yekatrinburg in an attempt to rescue the royal family, but have arrived too late, as the Tsar and his family have already been killed.

In the aftermath of the war Volkov worked in various jobs as a translator, including the mission set up in Russia by Fridtjof Nansen, the Associated Press, and the Greek embassy in Russia.

Volkov was first arrested in 1928, following his refusal to serve as an informant for the NKVD. He was charged with counterrevolutionary activities and sent to SLON to serve a 3-year sentence, but in April 1929 his term was amended to inner exile in Tula Oblast, where he worked as a translator of technical literature.

In 1931 Volkov was once again arrested and sentenced to 5 years of hard labour for counterrevolutionary agitation. In 1936 his term once again was amended to exile, this time in Arkhangelsk.

Volkov's third arrest was in 1936, when he was sentenced to 5 years in the Ukhtpechlag under accusation of being a "socially dangerous element." This time Volkov served all 5 years, and began working as a geologist in Komi after his release in 1941.

However, this freedom did not last long, as Volkov was again arrested in March 1942 and sentence to 4 years of hard labour for counterrevolutionary agitation. He was released in 1942 for physical disability and left for Kirovabad (now Ganja, Azerbaijan) where he worked as a teacher of foreign languages.

Between 1946 and 1950 Volkov lived in Kaluga, working again as a translator. Volkov's last arrest was in 1950, when he was sentenced to inner exile in Krasnoyarsk for five years, where he worked various jobs, including working as a driver, carpenter, and hunter.

== Professional career ==
In 1957 Volkov began his writing career, following a recommendation from Sergey Mikhalkov, a famous Soviet writer. He wrote mostly short stories and translated to Russian works by figures such as André Bonnard and Edouard Herriot.

Volkov has spent much of his later life advocating for conservation of nature and cultural monuments in the USSR. He was one of the founders of "All-Russian society for the protection of monuments of history and culture", and was a leading figure in the All-Russian society for the protection of nature, a group dedicated to conservation of natural environment within the USSR and especially the Russian SFSR. However, Volkov later left both of these organizations, citing their lack of organizational freedom and subordination to the central government.

Volkov wrote his most famous work in the early 1960s - "A Journey into darkness", an autobiography and memoire detailing his years in the prison camps of the USSR. It was not released in the USSR until the late 1980s.

Volkov passed away on the 10th of February 1996. He is buried in the Troyekurovsky cemetery in Moscow.

== Personal life ==
Volkov was married twice. His first marriage, from 1924 to 1968, was to a woman named Sofia Mamontova-Volkova (1904–1991), a healthcare worker. Together, they had a daughter, Maria Volkova-Ignatchenko (1924–2005), and a son, Vsevolod Volkov (born 1935).

Volkov's second marriage was to Margarita Sergeyevna Volkova (born 1931). Together they had a daughter, Olga Volkova (born 1963).

Having worked as a translator for many years, Volkov was fluent in multiple foreign languages since early youth. He spoke French fluently (according to him, he spoke French even before he spoke Russian, as was common in pre-revolutionary Russian aristocracy), as well as Greek, English, and Russian, and possibly more languages.

Volkov was a devout Orthodox Christian, despite coming from a rather secular family. According to his second wife, he has remained an anti-communist and a monarchist his entire life.

== Awards ==
- Order "for services in the field of literature and art" (France)
- State prize of the RSFSR in the field of literature
- Pushkin award of the A. Topfer fund

== Bibliography ==
- Молодые охотники. — М.: Физкультура и спорт, 1951.
- В тихом краю. — М.: Советский писатель, 1959.
- Клад Кудеяра. — М.: Советский писатель, 1963.
- Родная моя Россия. — М., 1970
- Ту граду быть…. — М.: Московский рабочий, 1974.
- Енисейские пейзажи. Очерки и рассказы. — М.: Современник, 1974.
- Чур, заповедано! — М.: Советская Россия, 1976
- В тихом краю. — М., 1976.
- В конце тропы. — М.: Современник, 1978.
- Случай на промысле. — М.: Советский писатель, 1980.
- Каждый камень в ней живой. — М., 1985.
- Все в ответе. — М., 1986.
- Погружение во тьму, P.: Atheneum, 1987; М.: «Молодая гвардия», Товарищество русских художников, 1989; Роман-газета, 1990.
- Избранное. — М., 1987.
- Век надежд и крушений. — М.: Советский писатель, 1989.
- Град Петра. — М., 1992.
- Два стольных града. — М., 1994.

=== Translations ===
- Боннар А. Греческая цивилизация / Пер. с франц. — Т. 1. От Илиады до Парфенона. — М.: Издательство иностранной литературы, 1958. — 256 с.
- Боннар А. Греческая цивилизация / Пер. с франц. — Т. 2. От Антигоны до Сократа. — М.: Издательство иностранной литературы, 1959. — 316 с.
- Ренуар Ж. Огюст Ренуар / Пер. с франц.. — М.: Искусство, 1970. — 361 с. — (Жизнь в искусстве).
