= Julius Margolin =

Julius Margolin (Russian: Юлий (Юлиус) Борисович Марголин, Hebrew: יוליוס מרגולין; October 14, 1900 – January 21, 1971) was an Israeli writer and political activist. After spending five years in Soviet labor camps and being released, he authored A Journey to the Land Ze-Ka (Путешествие в страну Зэ-Ка), one of the first books about Soviet Gulag published long before the books by Aleksandr Solzhenitsyn.

== Biography ==
Margolin was born in Pinsk, Russian Empire. He studied at the Humboldt University of Berlin. Margolin received his doctorate in philosophy in 1929. He then moved to Łódź, Poland, and later, in 1936, to Palestine. Three years later he was visiting his relatives in Pinsk and was trapped there by the Soviet invasion of Poland. Together with numerous other "socially dangerous elements", he was rounded up by the NKVD and sent to a labor camp on the northern bank of the Lake Onega. He survived, and was freed in 1945 as a former Polish citizen according to the agreement with Poland. In 1946, he was permitted to return to Poland. He emigrated to Palestine, settling in Tel Aviv.

== Literary career ==
He completed A Journey to the Land Ze-Ka in 1947, when Aleksandr Solzhenitsyn had just been sent to the gulag. It was impossible to publish such a book about the Soviet Union in the West at that time, immediately after World War II. The manuscript was also rejected by publishers in Israel. An abridged version was published in France in 1949. The book was printed in the United States in 1952 by Chekhov Publishing House (also abridged), and was reprinted in 1975.

In 1951, Margolin testified at the trial of David Rousset, who was accused of revealing information about the gulag to the French public.

== Published works ==
- 1949 - Margoline Jules. La condition inhumaine. Cinq ans dans les camps de concentration Sovietiques Traduit par N. Berberova & Mina Journot. Novembre 1949. Calmann-Levi, Editeurs, Paris.
- 1952 - Марголин Ю. Б. "Путешествие в страну зэ-ка", 414 стр. Chekhov Publishing House, New York
  - Reprinted several times in various places
- 1965 - Julius Margolin Uberleben ist alles. Aufzeichnungen aus sowietischen Lagern, Munchen,
- Separate chapters from the book were also published in various magazines.
- 2010 - Julius Margolin, Voyage au pays des Ze-Ka. The first complete edition (more than 1/3 of the text had never been published before in any language). Edited by Luba Jurgenson. October 2010, Le Bruit du temps, Paris. More information here.
- 2013 - Reise in das Land der Lager. Suhrkamp Verlag, November 2013, ISBN 978-3518424063.
- 2013 - Julius Margolin, "Podróż do krainy zeków", translated by Jerzy Czech, Czarne publishing house, ISBN 978-83-7536-538-2

== See also ==
- In the Claws of the GPU, a Gulag memoir by a citizen of interwar Poland, published in 1935.
