= Evgenia Iaroslavskaia-Markon =

Russian crime journalist and lecturer (1902–1931)

- Евгения Ярославская-Маркон
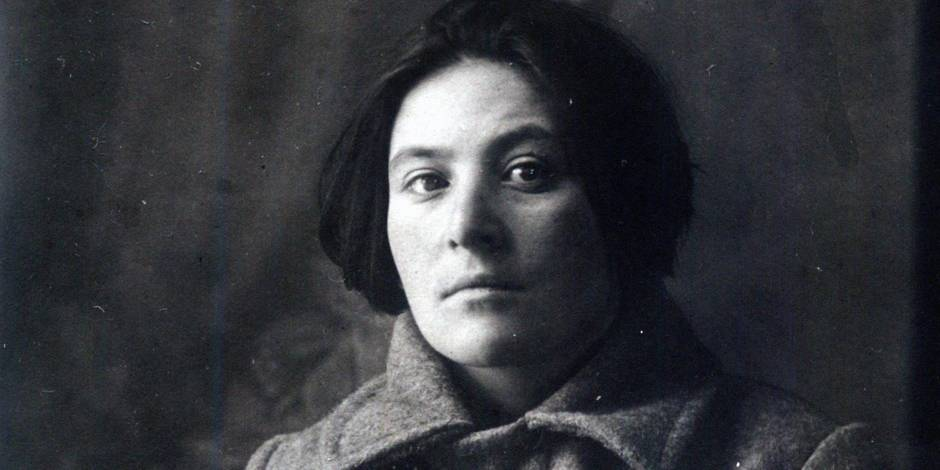
- Markon, unknown photographer
- Born: 14 May 1902; Saint Petersburg, Russian Empire
- Died: 16 July 1931 (aged 29); Solovki. Northern Krai, Russian SFSR
- Cause of death: Execution by shooting
- Education: Petrograd State University
- Occupations: Journalist, lecturer
- Movement: Anarchism
- Criminal charges: Theft
- Spouse: Aleksandr Iaroslavskii

Evgenia Isaakovna Iaroslavskaia-Markon (Russian: Евгения Исааковна Ярославская-Маркон; 1902–1931) was a Russian radical journalist, lecturer and thief.

== Early life ==
Evgenia Isaaknova Iaroslavskaia-Markon was born in St. Petersburg and raised in a prominent Jewish family. Her father, Isaac Dov-Ben Markon was a scholar of Judaism and well known in the St. Petersburg Jewish community. She went to a private gymnasium in St. Petersburg and graduated from Petrograd State University in 1922, where she studied philosophy.

From a young age, she was aware of and fascinated by the political turmoil in Russia, especially surrounding political prisoners. She joined the Russian Social Democratic Labor Party when she went to Moscow, and sold their newspapers. She left the party when she left Moscow. Food rations were scarce and she began to starve, causing her to become disillusioned with communism.

== Marriage ==
She met the poet and lecturer Aleksandr Iaroslavskii after graduating university in 1922 and married him in 1923. Iaroslavskii was a notable Russian biocosmist poet, member of a movement that combined socialism with scientific futurism and that was suppressed by Stalin in the 1930s. Markon's own fate was sealed in her refusal to denounce her husband's views. In her autobiography, Markon speaks of the passionate and devoted love they shared and their mutual respect for each other's beliefs and thoughts.

== Lecture tours ==
After marrying, Markon and Iaroslavskii went on a lecturing tour together throughout the USSR, speaking on literary and anti-religious topics. In 1923, Markon fell underneath a train and had to have both of her feet amputated. In 1926, she went on an international lecture tour with Iaroslavskii. While staying in Berlin, Iaroslavskaia-Markon wrote for Rul, a Menshevik newspaper, on the criminal world and on the homeless. In her regular column she published sketches from her travels in 1922–1926 with Iaroslavskii, in which she extolled the criminal underworld.

Her fascination with the world of crime led to her electing criminal behavior and poverty as a lifestyle. After lecturing abroad, her husband wanted to return to Russia. Markon had become happy and comfortable in Paris, France, where she stayed in free, welcoming homeless shelters. She had hoped to get in contact with Nestor Makhno and work with him on revolutionary activity in Ukraine, but eventually returned to Russia in 1928 with her husband.

== Criminal activity and arrests ==
Iaroslavskii was arrested when they returned to Russia, and Markon threw herself into the criminal world right away. She sold newspapers and learned how to steal (she viewed pickpocketing as an art form). During this time in her life, she experienced homelessness, assault, hunger, and danger. She switched to selling flowers, which was still difficult. She had dreams to organize criminals and to work with them to release common and political prisoners, as well as to set up systems for mutual aid.

After her husband's arrest in 1928, Markon began to travel around Russia to follow Iaroslavskii who was being moved from prison to prison, and she faced difficulties with money and struggled to be able to see him. She continued stealing and became more advanced in her capabilities.

She was arrested once for stealing travel bags, and a second time for stealing from an apartment. For her second arrest, she was exiled to the town of Ustiuzhna in the Vologda region, and lived in a government building with few supplies and furniture. There, she began working as a fortune teller, making money from locals who visited her. She continued her practice in the town after she was freed, but was soon arrested again after breaking into and stealing from a store. She was exiled to Siberia in 1929 and moved from village to village, continuing to practice fortunetelling.

She escaped from exile in Siberia and went to Kem, where she plotted to free her husband from prison. She was arrested in 1930 and sent to the Solovetskii camp where she was assigned three years of forced labor. However, after her husband was executed on 10 December 1930, Markon protested at the camp and threw a stone at Dmitrii Vasilevich Uspenskii (a prison warden nicknamed "The Execution Hobbyist") and was then moved to an isolation camp.

=== Execution ===
An investigation report as well as a report from a guard describe her rowdy behavior in jail, and her eventual execution. She was vocal about her disgust for the Soviet regime and her dedication to defend her husband. She attacked guards and attempted suicide twice, and never stopped speaking passionately about her anti-soviet views. She wrote "My Autobiography" in February 1931 when in the isolation camp. She was executed on 16 July 1931.

== Ideology ==
Markon was a radical thinker whose ideologies leaned toward an anarchist perspective. She was disgusted with the Soviet regime and "authoritarian communism" in Russia. In her column for Rul, she wrote.

Thus, the efforts of the communist government notwithstanding, independent critical thought has not been crushed; it continues to work, to seek, to find, to become lost, and to seek once more... It has always been thus, and it will continue to be so.

She was also antireligious, which she spoke of on her lecture tours, mocking the conflict between religion and communism. In her autobiography, she wrote that she "fell in love with revolution" at the age of 12.
