= V.V. Dokuchaev Central Museum of Soil =

Soil science museum in Russia

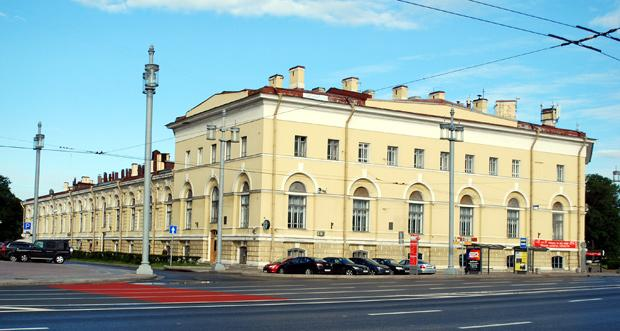
V.V. Dokuchaev Central Museum of Soil

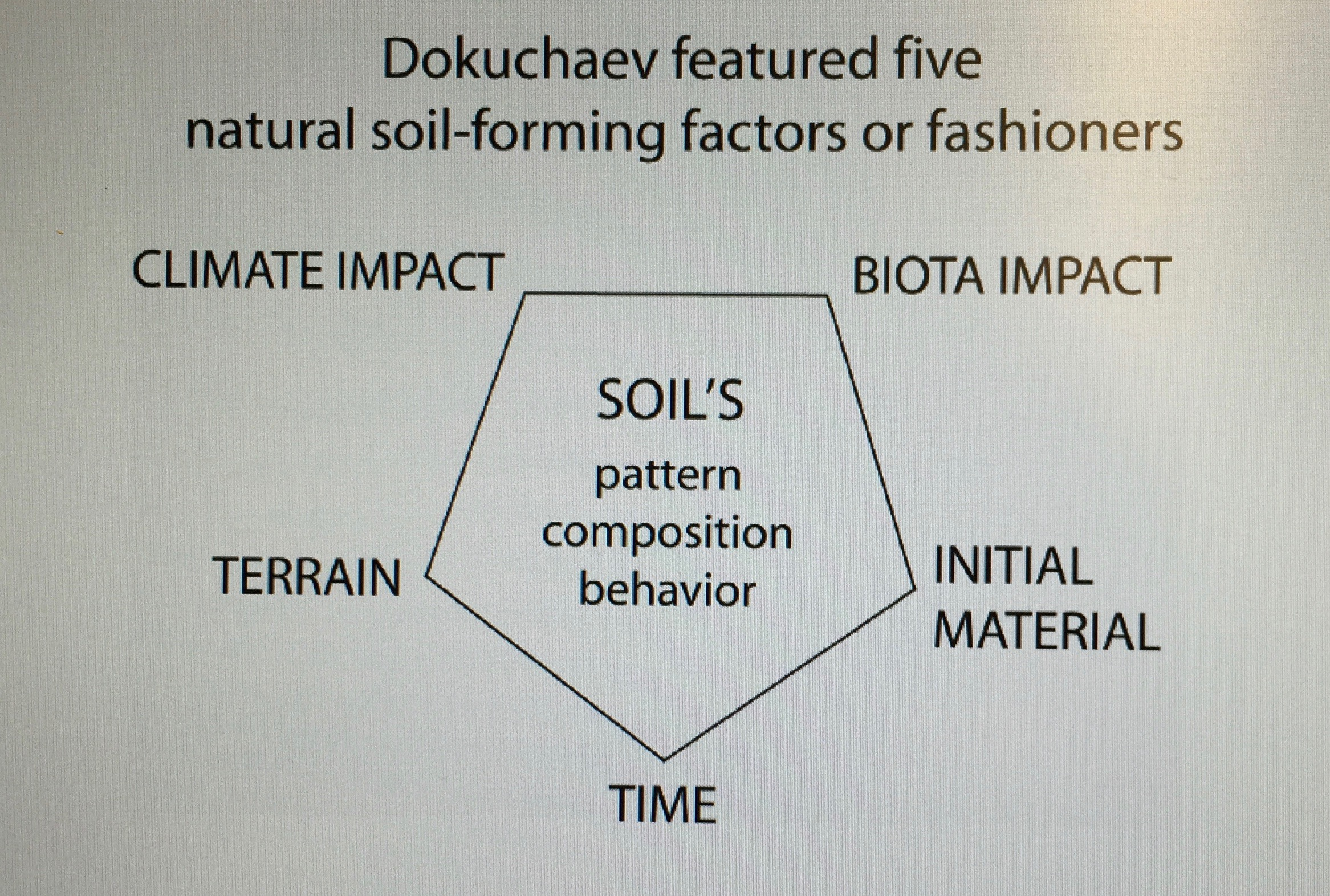
5 Natural soil-forming factors featured by Vasilli Vasil'evich Dokuchaev

V.V. Dokuchaev Central Museum of Soil was founded in 1902 at Saint Petersburg by Vasilli Vasil'evich Dokuchaev (1846–1903). Commonly regarded as the father of Soil science, Dokuchaev started his extensive collection of soil samples in 1880. The first museum of soil sciences in the world, V.V. Dokuchaev Central Pedological Museum, opened in 1904, a year after his death.

Some of the samples were collected as early as in 1902. Also, the soil monoliths for this collection were brought from around the world, from the Arctic to New Zealand. There are about 330 soil monoliths representing the global diversity of soils, with scientists' embarking on various expeditions to bring new monoliths every year.
