= Sozerko Malsagov =

Russian Imperial Army officer (1895–1976)

Sozerko Artagovich Malsagov (Russian: Мальсагов, Созерко Артаганович) (June 17, 1895 - February 25, 1976), was a Russian Imperial Army officer known for his memoir about his escape from the Solovki prison camp, "An Island of hell".

Malsagov, together with four other inmates (Matvey Sazonov,Yuri Bezsonov, Edward Malbrocki (a Pole), and Vasily Pribudin) escaped from Solovki on May 18, 1925, and ran to Finland. Bezsonov also wrote a similar memoir.

== Memoir ==
- Соловки. Остров пыток и смерти (Записки бежавшего с Соловков офицера С.А. Мальсагова), 1925, in Russian emigre newspaper Сегодня, Riga
- S.A. Malsagoff. An Island Hell: A Soviet Prison in the Far North, London, A.M. Philpot LTD., 1926. Translated by F.H.Lyon.
- Адский остров. Советская тюрьма на далеком севере, 1996, translated from English by Sh. Yandiev (Ш. Яндиев)
