= Boris Shiryaev =

Boris Nikolayevich Shiryaev (Russian: Бори́с Никола́евич Ширя́ев; born 27 October (8 November) 1889 in Moscow, Russian Empire – died 17 April 1959 in San Remo, Italy) was a Russian writer of the "second wave" of exile and a participant of the Russian apostolate in the Russian Diaspora. A member of the White movement during the Russian Civil War, during the occupation of the southern Russian city of Stavropol by the German Wehrmacht, he collaborated with the occupiers by publishing anti-Soviet newspapers and consequently had to flee to Italy. He was a member of the Russian Greek Catholic Church in Diaspora.

== Biography ==
=== Early life ===
Boris Shiryaev was born in Moscow in 1889, the son of the hereditary Orthodox Christian landlord. At the end of History and Philology of Moscow State University was engaged in teaching and theater. Then he studied at the University of Göttingen (Germany). Returning to Russia, he graduated from the General Staff Academy (Imperial Russia). During the First World War, joined to army, reaching the rank of captain. In 1918 he returned to Moscow and attempted to get into the Volunteer Army, but was arrested and sentenced by the Bolsheviks to death for trying to cross the border. A few hours before the execution was running. In 1922 Shiryaev faced a new arrest in Butyrka prison. Shiryaev was sentenced to death, which was replaced by 10 years of exile in Solovki prison camp, and along with hard labor Boris participated in the camp theater and the magazine "Solovetsky Islands", where in 1925-26 published the novel "1237 lines" and several poems: "Solovki", "The Dialectics of today", "Turkestan poems," etc. Shiryaev collected and recorded camp folklore, which was published a brochure circulation of 2000 copies. In 1929 was replaced by a reference to 3 years in Central Asia, where Shiryaev was a journalist. On his return in 1932 to Moscow, Shiryaev was arrested again and sent to 3 years to Rossosh village (Voronezh Oblast). From 1935 to 1942 he lived in the North Caucasus in Stavropol and Cherkessk.

=== WW2 and German collaboration ===
Before the start of Second World War could Shiryaev snatches back to teaching and lecturing in the provincial universities. On the eve of the outbreak of war Shiryaev taught history of Russian literature in the Stavropol Pedagogical Institute. After the occupation of Stavropol German and Romanian troops (on 3 August 1942) and the closure of the Institute headed by Boris Shiryaev, newspaper "Stavropol word" first issue in the amount of four pages came a week after the arrival of the Germans. He wore a clear anti-Soviet, but the German censorship in it subject only to a summary of news from the front. Four months later, the newspaper was renamed the "Morning of the Caucasus", has spread across the North Caucasus region. At the approaches to the city of the Soviet troops Shiryaev left Stavropol with the Germans. In May 1943 he attended school in Dabendorf ROA (at Berlin). Boris Shiryaev was the captain of the RAF, worked with the rules issued in Crimea fascist newspaper "Voice of the Crimea," and in June 1943, in Simferopol he obtained of the German High Command an awarded Hitler insignia established for distinguished himself in the fight against Bolshevism. In the "unquenchable oil lamp" is present as an indirect criticism of the Russian Liberation Army, and its chief Andrey Vlasov probably in 1944 Shiryaev was somehow involved in the Cossack camp, in the magazine "The Cossack guard" and ideological design Cossack movement from 1943 to 1945, which participated in the fighting on the side of the Wehrmacht, first in Poland, then in Northern Italy. In February 1945 Shiryaev was sent to Northern Italy for founding the new Russian publication.

=== Later life ===
After the war, in the spring of 1945, Boris Shiryaev stayed in Italy and ended up in a camp for displaced persons (Capua), a life in which the book is devoted to the " Pee Dee in Italy ", published in Russian in Buenos Aires in 1952. "Pee Dee" comes from the abbreviation of DPs, Displaced persons, so dubbed in the West after Second World War, millions of refugees who tried, often unsuccessfully, to find refuge from Stalin's secret police. In Italy Boris Shiryaev actively writing fiction and literary articles, published in the Russian magazine "Rebirth" and "The Edge." The first three Shiryaev's books - " Pee Dee in Italy "( 1952), "I'm a Russian" (1953) and "Lights of the Russian Land" (1953) were published in Buenos Aires, with the assistance of his associate, living in Argentina, the publicist and monarchical publisher Ivan Solonevich, whose brother, Boris Solonevich also sat in prisons. The best-known works by Boris Shiryaev " Inextinguishable lamp "is dedicated to his stay in the Solovki prison camp. This is a documentary novel, which consists of a series of stories about the most interesting events and meetings, the author of the Solovetsky Katorga. "Dedicated to the memory of the artist Mikhail Nesterov, who told me on the day the sentence: "Do not be afraid to Solovki prison camp. There, Christ is near "," - wrote Boris Shiryaev in the dedication of "unquenchable oil lamp.", according to the author, a book what he wrote with the mid-1920s and completed in exile on the Capri Island in 1950. Boris Shiryaev died on 17 April 1959 in San Remo.

== Religious faith ==
Boris Shiryaev belonged to the Russian Apostolate, a Russian Catholics' abroad movement. He was a converted from Russian Orthodox Church.

== Works ==
- Pee Dee in Italy. - Buenos Aires, 1952
- Human Russian! - Buenos Aires, 1953
- Luminaries of the Russian Land. - Buenos Aires, 1953
- Inextinguishable lamp. - New York, 1954
- The last gentleman. - 1954
- To the intellectuals of the Soviet Union. - Munich, 1955
- Kudeyarov oak. - 1958
- Religious motifs in Russian poetry. - Brussels, 1962
