= Gennady Bessonov =

Gennady Bessonov may refer to:

- Gennady Bessonov (athlete) (born 1944), Russian Olympic triple jumper
- Gennady Bessonov (weightlifter) (born 1954), Russian weightlifter
