= Joan-Daniel Bezsonoff =

French writer

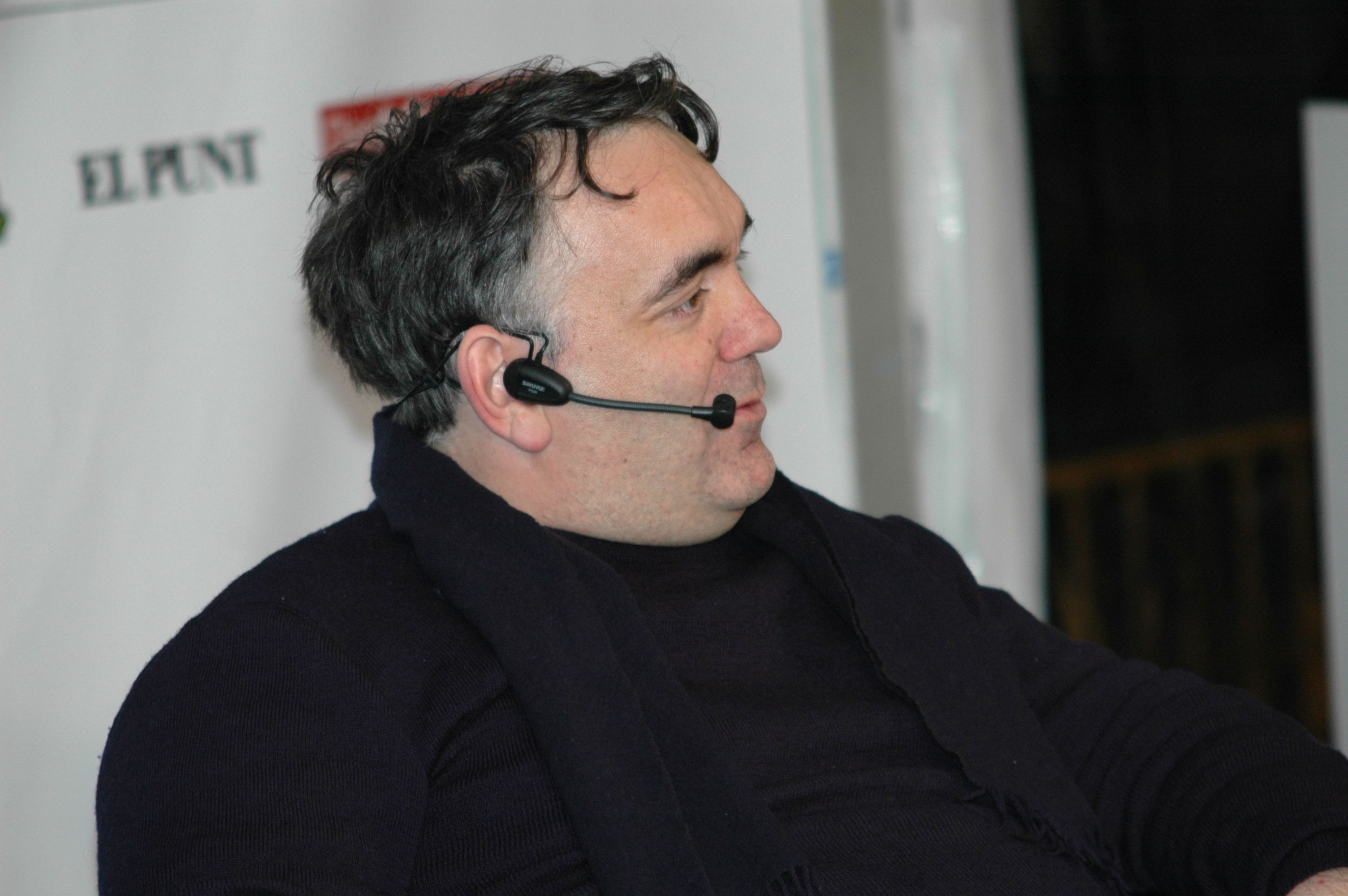
Image of Joan-Daniel Bezsonoff

Joan-Daniel Bezsonoff (born 1963) is a French/Catalan writer and scholar. He was born in Perpignan, where he is presently a professor of the Catalan language. He has published many novels, among which are La guerra dels cornuts (2004), which won the Premi Just M. Casero in 2003 and the Prix Mediterranée in 2004; Les amnèsies de Déu (2005), winner of the Salambó, Premi Crexells and Maria Àngels Anglada literary prizes; and Una educació francesa (2009), which won the Premi Lletra d'Or.
