= Yury Bezsonov =

Georgy Dmitrievich Bezsonov, variant: Yury Dmitrievich Bezsonov (Безсонов, Георгий/Юрий Дмитриевич)) (1891-1950) was a Russian Imperial Army cavalry officer, known for his memoir about the Soviet Solovki prison camp and his escape from there. He was born in St. Petersburg Russia in 1891 and died in Paris France in 1950. More information about him can be found on the Russian database http://swolkov.org/info1.htm .

He escaped from Solovki prison camp in 1925, together with four other inmates: Matvey Sazonov, Ingush Sozerko Malsagov, Pole Eduard Malbrodsky and Vasily Pribludin. Malsagov also wrote a similar memoir.

== Memoir ==
Двадцать шесть тюрем и побег с Соловков
