= Frantsishak Alyakhnovich =

Belarusian writer and journalist

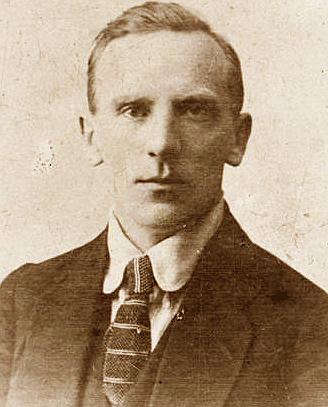
Frantsishak Alyakhnovich

Frantsishak Alyakhnovich (March 9, 1883 in Vilnius – March 3, 1944 in Vilnius, Belarusian: Франці́шак Ка́ралевіч Аляхно́віч, romanized: Francišak Karalevič Alachnovič, Russian: Франтишек Ка́рлович Олехно́вич (also Аляхнoвичъ, Франц Олехнович), Polish: Franciszek Olechnowicz) was a Belarusian writer and journalist descended from the Ruthenian nobility, known for his authorship of In the Claws of the GPU.

Alyakhnovich was a theatrical writer, director and journalist in West Belarus. He was editor of the newspaper Беларускі звон (Biełaruski zvon) published in Vilnius.

In 1926 he decided to stay in East Belarus after a conference in Minsk. Several months later he was arrested by the GPU and sent to Solovki prison camp. He spent seven years in the Gulag and only in 1933 was he exchanged for Branislaw Tarashkyevich, a West Belarusian politician and linguist held in a Polish prison.

Alyakhnovich's Gulag experience became a basis for his 1934 book of memoirs У капцюрох ГПУ (U kapciuroch HPU, In the claws of the GPU), that was later translated into several languages.

During the Second World War, Alyakhnovich collaborated with Nazi Germany and was editor of the newspaper Беларускі голас (Biełaruski hołas, Belarusian voice) published in Vilnius. Apart from that, he was also one of the leaders of the Belarusian Independence Party - an illegal and underground Belarusian nationalist organization led by Fr. Vincent Hadleŭski.

In 1944, Frantsishak Alyakhnovich was shot dead in his apartment by an unknown person.

== Legacy ==
The “Award of Frantsishak Alyakhnovich” founded jointly with the Belarusian Service of Radio Liberty/Radio Free Europe in 2013, the award goes (not annually) to authors for the best work in any genre in Belarusian and Russian, written in prison. Authors are free to submit published works or manuscripts.
