= Alexander Barchenko =

Russian biologist (1881–1938)

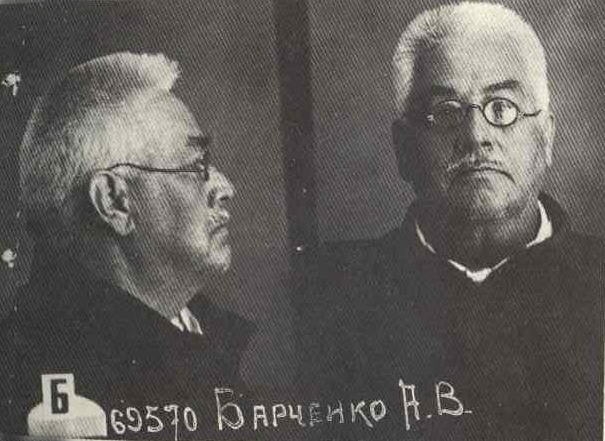
Barchenko's NKVD mugshot in 1937

Alexander Vasilyevich Barchenko (Russian: Александр Васильевич Барченко; 1881, Yelets — April, 1938, Moscow) was a Russian occultist. In 1904 Barchenko attended the medical faculty of Kazan University, and subsequently entered Yuryev University. He is known first and foremost for his research concerning Hyperborea in the Russian Far East region.

In 1925, he met and corresponded with Rabbi Menachem Mendel Schneerson, who assisted him in his research and studies of religious and mystical matters.

He was executed in Moscow during the Great Purge on April 25, 1938.

== See also ==
- Gleb Bokii
