= Belbaltlag =

Gulag forced labor camp

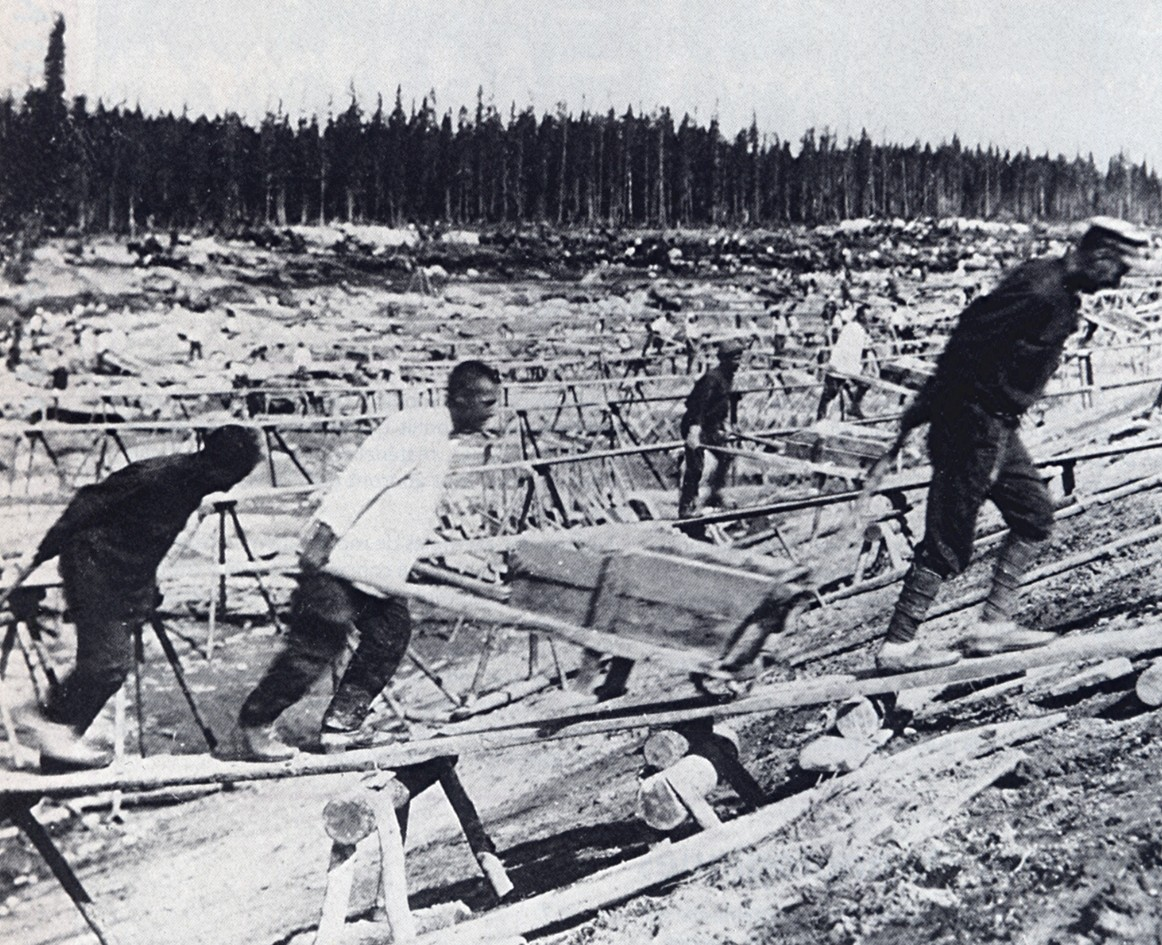
Inmates during the construction

Belbaltlag (Russian names: Белбалтлаг, БелБалтлаг, ББЛ, Беломорско-Балтийский ИТЛ) was the Soviet Gulag forced labor camp whose main purpose was manning the construction of the White Sea–Baltic Canal. It was established on November 16, 1931 from the Solovki prison camp and closed on February 26, 1941. Most of the time its headquarters were in Medvezhyegorsk. The number of inmates varied between about 58,000 and 99,000. After the construction of canal was finished the inmates were tasked with logging, various other constructions, fishing and manufacturing of various consumer foods.

== Death, execution and commemoration ==
Burial grounds of the Belbaltlag prisoners were located in the 1990s Sosnovets, Belomorsk and Letnerechenskoe. The three all enjoyed protected status.

Several of these sites were discovered by Yury Dmitriev.

In 2003 the Belbaltlag infirmary cemetery by the 8th lock settlement was discovered by Yury Dmitriev from Petrozavodsk.

It is thought that many other prisoners were executed and buried not far from Medvezhyegorsk at the enormous Sandarmokh memorial site.
