= Gleb Bokii =

Soviet secret police official (1879–1937)

Gleb Bokii Гліб Бокій
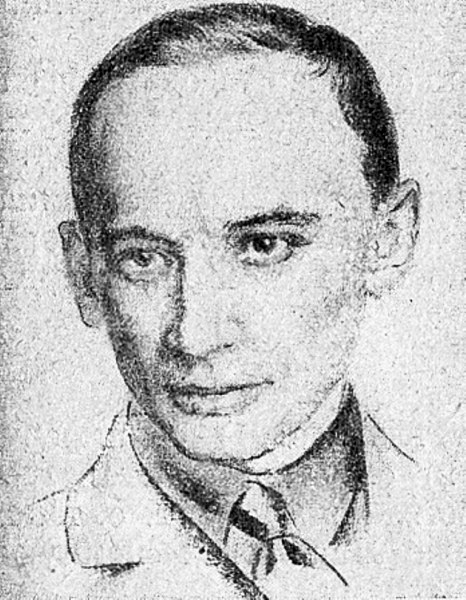

Head of the 9th Department of the GUGB of the NKVD
- In office December 25, 1936 – May 16, 1937
- Preceded by: Office established
- Succeeded by: Office abolished

Head of the Special Department of the NKVD
- In office July 10, 1934 – December 25, 1936
- Preceded by: Office established
- Succeeded by: Office abolished

Head of the Special Department of the Cheka/GPU/OGPU
- In office January 28, 1921 – July 10, 1934
- Preceded by: Office established
- Succeeded by: Office abolished

Chief of Cheka of Petrograd city
- In office August 31, 1918 – November 10, 1918
- Preceded by: Moisei Uritsky
- Succeeded by: Varvara Yakovleva

Personal details
- Born: 21 June 1879 Tbilisi, Russian Empire
- Died: 15 November 1937 (aged 58) Moscow, USSR
- Spouse(s): Sofia Doller (Married in July 1905 and later divorced in 1919); Elena Dobryakova
- Children: Elena, Oksana (from first marriage), Alla (from second marriage)

Military service
- Allegiance: Russian Soviet Federative Socialist Republic (1918–1922); Soviet Union (1922–1937)
- Branch/service: Cheka; GPU; OGPU; NKVD
- Years of service: 1918–1937
- Rank: Commissioner 3rd rank of State Security

Gleb Ivanovich Bokii (Ukrainian: Гліб Іванович Бокій, Russian: Глеб Иванович Бокий; 21 June 1879 – 15 November 1937) was a Soviet Communist political activist, revolutionary, and paranormal investigator in the Russian Empire. Following the October Revolution of 1917, Bokii became a leading member of the Cheka, the first Soviet secret police, and later of the OGPU and NKVD.

From 1921 through 1934, Bokii (alternative transliteration, Boky) headed the "special department" of the Soviet secret police apparatus. He remained a top level functionary in the secret police apparatus until his sudden arrest in May 1937 as part of the Great Terror. Following an extended investigation, Bokii was given a summary trial and executed in November of that same year. In 1956, Bokii was posthumously rehabilitated by Soviet authorities.

== Early years ==
Gleb Bokii was born July 3, 1879 (June 21 O.S.) into the family of an ethnic Ukrainian chemistry teacher and nobleman in Tiflis, Georgia in 1879. Bokii grew up in St. Petersburg, Russia, where he attended school, graduating from the Petersburg Mining Institute in 1896.

== Revolutionary career ==
Bokii was a participant in revolutionary student circles from an early age. Initially member and head of Ukrainian student hromada in St. Petersburg, he later became an adherent of Marxism and working with Vladimir Lenin's Union of Struggle for the Emancipation of the Working Class in 1897. Bokii joined the Russian Social Democratic Labor Party (RSDLP) in 1900 and worked in that organization as a professional revolutionary as a party organizer and propagandist.

In 1902, he was arrested and sentenced to three years exile in east Siberia. Bokii was a loyalist to the Bolshevik faction of that organization, headed by V.I. Lenin and was elected a member of the governing Petersburg Committee of the RSDLP from 1904 to 1909. In these early activist years, Bokii was already to show impressive talent in cryptography, a skill which will go on to be evident and ongoing in his later Soviet career.

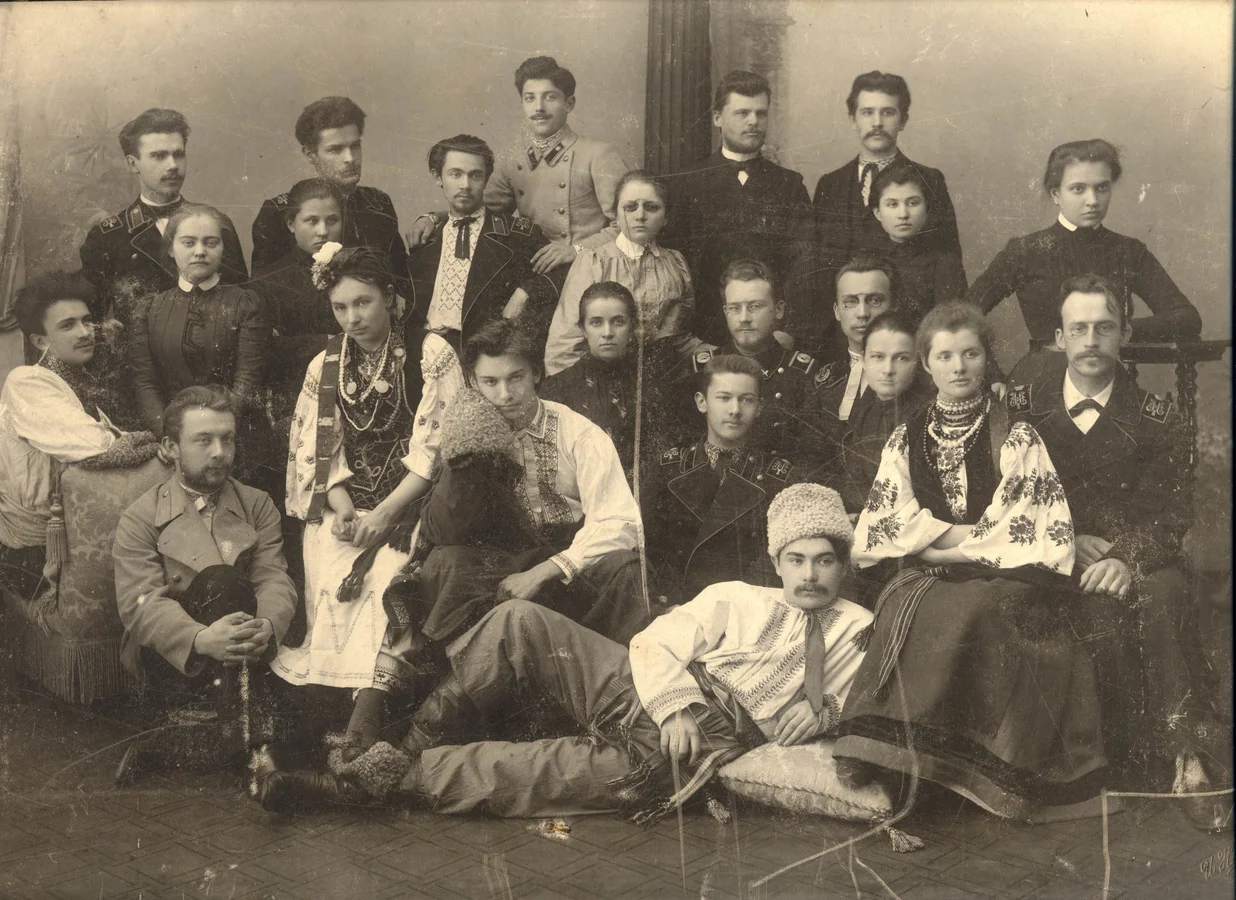
Ukrainian student community (hromada) in St. Petersburg, early 1900s. Gleb Bokiy in the second row holds a smoosh cap in his hand.

In the Revolution of 1905, Bokii participated in street fighting on Vasilyevsky Island, part of St. Petersburg bounded by the Neva River.

At the time of World War I, Bokii served as a member of the Central Bureau of the RSDLP from 1914 to 1915 and a member of the Russian Bureau of the Central Committee of the party from 1916 to 1917.

During the course of his revolutionary activities, Bokii was arrested a dozen times, and suffered two terms of political exile to Siberia. He used the party names "Kuzma," "Diadia," and "Maksim Ivanovich" during the Bolshevik Party's underground period.

Early in 1917, Bokii was arrested and sentenced to exile in Yakutsk, but before he was transported, the Tsar Nicholas II was overthrown by the February Revolution, and he was released and resumed his leading role on the Petrograd City Committee, of which he served as Secretary from April 1917 to March 1918. He was also a member of the Petrograd Military Revolutionary Committee during October and November 1917 — the institution which planned and carried out the Bolshevik uprising on November 7.

Bokii was recognized as a supporter of the "Left Communists" headed by Nikolai Bukharin who sought to fight a revolutionary war against German invaders rather than signing a separate peace in the period immediately after the Bolshevik uprising. Together with Stanislav Kosior, Bokii was one of five signatories of a declaration of the Executive Commission of the Petersburg Committee directed at the governing Central Committee of the Russian Communist Party, which warned:

"The political line now being pursued by the Central Committee ... is directed toward conclusion of a so-called 'obscene' peace [which] would result in the abdication of our principles ... and the certain death of our party as a revolutionary vanguard. ...

We have ample grounds for asserting that signing an 'obscene' peace would run counter to the opinion of the majority in our party. ... If our present peace policy continues ... a split threatens our party."

A special party conference to decide the peace question was called for by Bokii and his comrades of the Peterburg Committee. German forces continued their advance on Petrograd in the interim and February and March 1918 saw Bokii take on an additional role organizing the city's defenses as member of the Committee for the Revolutionary Defense of Petrograd.

Ultimately, the German offensive was halted when Lenin and the party Central Committee won the day by signing the Treaty of Brest-Litovsk with the government of Imperial Germany on March 3, 1918. Territory including a quarter of Russia's population and a quarter of its industry were ceded to the Germans under the onerous terms of the peace.

== Secret police activities ==
On March 13, 1918, Bokii went to work as deputy head of the Extraordinary Commission (Cheka) of the Northern oblast and Petrograd. He remained in this position until the end of August 1918, at which time he was briefly made the head of that same organization following the assassination of his chief, Moisei Uritsky. Bokii was a participant in the Red Terror which was part and parcel of the Civil War which began in the summer of 1918, for example signing a list of 122 prominent hostages published in the Petrograd official newspaper on September 6, threatening their execution if even one more Soviet official was killed by terrorists.

Despite this complicity, historian Alexander Rabinowitch indicates that Bokii was among the more moderate Bolshevik voices on the question of the use of terror in the summer of 1918, siding with Elena Stasova in opposing Grigory Zinoviev's call for a full scale Red Terror at a critical meeting held in the wake of Uritsky's killing.

Whatever his personal views, Bokii as head of the Petrograd Cheka in the days after Uritsky's death was the ultimate authority behind the Red Terror in Petrograd and it was to him that the German government directed its complaints. The German consul in Petrograd was bombarded with letters demanding the release of individuals from countries under German protection who were swept up in the dragnet — over 1000 in all. On September 10, 1918 Bokii responded by forwarding to the Consul the text of a message he had sent to district soviets ordering the release of all citizens of nations under German protection against whom no specific evidence supporting charges of speculation or counterrevolutionary activity could be mustered. Bokii's explicit directive was largely ignored, however, and by the end of the month only about 200 out of the 1000 names provided by the Germans had been freed.

Bokii's moderation with respect to the use of terror brought him into conflict with Zinoviev, who in mid-September 1918 was advancing the idea of distributing arms to the Petrograd workers and allowing them to administer mob justice against their perceived class enemies as they saw fit. Stasova seems to have felt that her ally Bokii was in physical danger if he remained in Petrograd without protection and she appealed to Yakov Sverdlov for his transfer to Moscow, outside of Zinoviev's fief. According to a biography of Bokii published in the last years of the Soviet Union, Bokii was successfully removed as head of the Petrograd Cheka by Zinoviev by the end of that month.

Other sources indicate that Bokii remained as the head of the Petrograd secret police until November 1918, at which time he was made a member of the collegium of the People's Commissariat of Internal Affairs (NKVD) of Soviet Russia. Bokii continued in that capacity until the middle of September 1919, when he was dispatched to the Eastern Front to head the special detachment of the Cheka there.

In October 1919, Bokii was sent by Cheka head Felix Dzerzhinsky to Tashkent to head the operations of the Cheka the Turkestan Front. He remained there in that capacity until the effective end of the Russian Civil War in August 1920. During this interval he was also a member of the Turkestan Commission of the All-Russian Central Executive Committee and the Council of People's Commissars (Sovnarkom).

Bokii was shaken by the terror he played significant roles in. Regarding Kronstadt, Bokii later stated, "The Kronstadt events produced an indelible impression on me. I could not reconcile myself to the idea that the very sailors who took part in the October Revolution revolted against our party and our power." His further ideological disillusionment or frustration lead to his delving into esoteric mysticism in the 1920s.

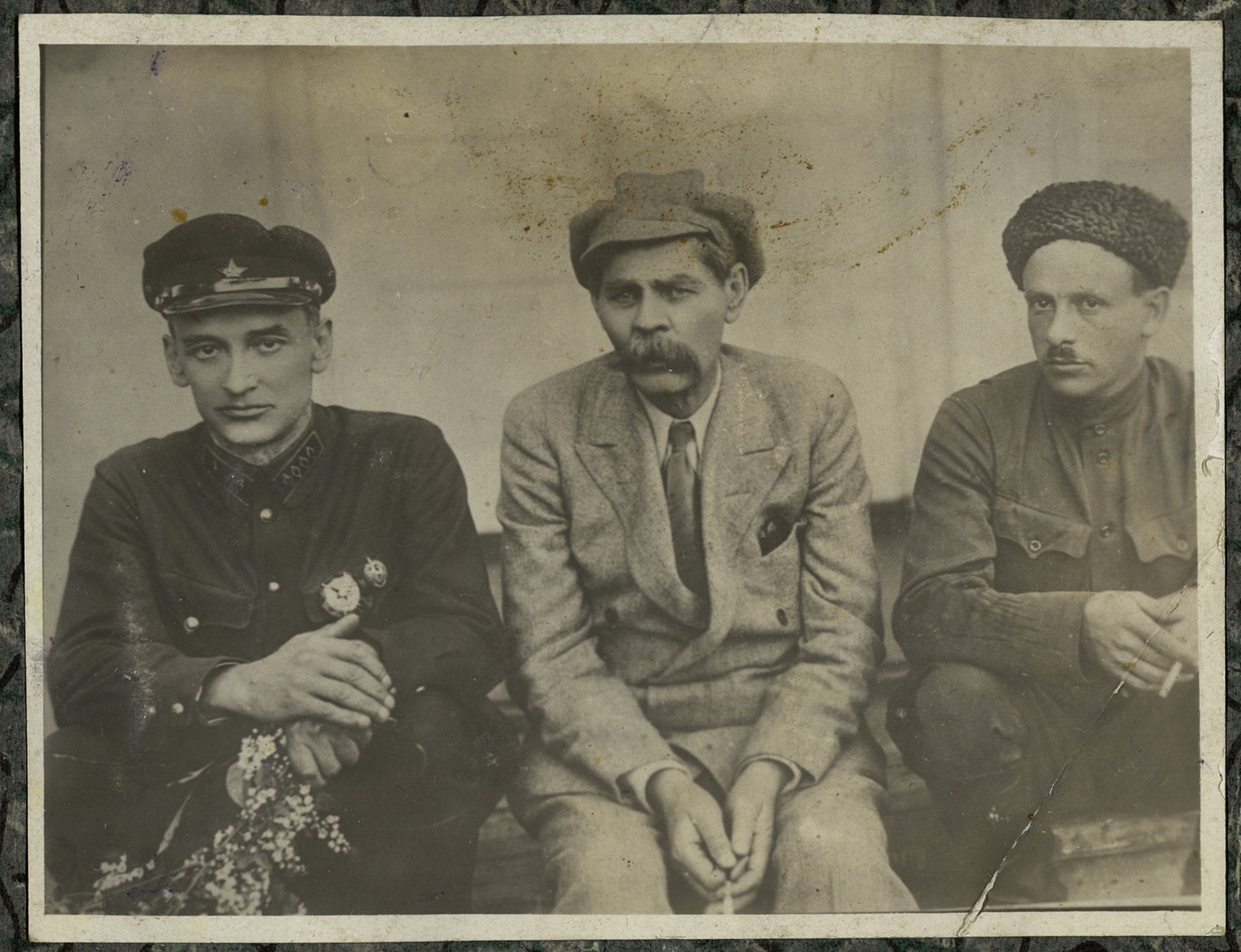
Bokii, Maxim Gorky and Matvey Pogrebinsky on the Gleb Bokii steam boat named after him

Bokii became head of the "special department" of the All-Union Extraordinary Commission in the last days of January 1921. Bokii has been said to have been "one of the most active creators of the Gulag system" and labelled by another historian as "the OGPU boss in charge of concentration camps" in the early 1920s. Such claims may tend to hyperbole, however, as he figures in the account of Alexander Solzhenitsyn only as the head of the Moscow troika rather than as architect or chief of the camp system itself.

Bokii remained as head of the "special department" of the secret police apparatus through its various incarnations as the Cheka, the GPU, and the OGPU, until July 10, 1934. He was also a member of the collegium of the OGPU through this same date. He had lesser influence after July 1934, within the NKVD.

In April 1923, Bokii was awarded the Order of the Red Banner in recognition of his work on behalf of the USSR.

Bokii later moved to the Supreme Court of the USSR, of which he was a member until May 16, 1937. He was also head of the Chief Department of State Security of the NKVD until that same date.

== Arrest and execution ==
On May 16, 1937, Bokii was suddenly arrested by the secret police and charged with conspiratorial activity. Following a lengthy investigation, Bokii was brought before the Military Collegium of the Supreme Soviet on November 15, 1937, and sentenced to death. He was shot that same day.

== Tantric studies ==
Inspired by Theosophical lore and several visiting Mongol lamas, Bokii along with his writer friend Alexander Barchenko, embarked on a quest for Shambhala, in an attempt to merge Kalachakra-tantra and ideas of Communism in the 1920s. Among other things, in a secret laboratory affiliated with the secret police, Bokii and Barchenko experimented with Buddhist spiritual techniques to try to find a key for engineering perfect communist human beings. They contemplated a special expedition to Inner Asia to retrieve the wisdom of Shambhala – the project fell through as a result of intrigues within the Soviet intelligence service, as well as rival efforts of the Soviet Foreign Commissariat that sent its own expedition to Tibet in 1924. Bokii also held group sex orgies in his dacha under the pretext of tantric studies.

== Posthumous rehabilitation and legacy ==
Bokii's fellow bureaucratic NKVD foes had conjured up fictions of his being as a sort of Dracula-like human blood drinker. On June 27, 1956, as part of the Thaw sponsored by new Soviet leader Nikita Khrushchev, Gleb Bokii's case was reviewed by the Military Collegium of the Supreme Soviet and he was posthumously rehabilitated, enabling his family members to receive social benefits which had been previously denied to them by the state.
