= Andrey Shebalkov =

- Андрей Георгиевич Шебалков
- Born: 30 October 1921; Gorkaya Balka, Svyatokrestovsky Uyezd, Terek Governorate, RSFSR
- Died: 17 June 1980 (aged 58); Zelenokumsk, Sovetsky District, Stavropol Krai, Soviet Union
- Military career
- Allegiance: Soviet Union
- Branch: Red Army
- Service years: 1941–1945
- Rank: Senior Sergeant
- Units: 34th Guards Motor Rifle Brigade, 12th Guards Tank Corps
- Conflicts: World War II; Battle of Kiev; Battle of Rostov; Case Blue; Battle of Stalingrad; Battle of Kursk; Operation Bagration; Vistula-Oder Offensive; East Pomeranian Offensive; Battle of Berlin
- Awards: Hero of the Soviet Union

Andrey Georgyevich Shebalkov (Russian: Андрей Георгиевич Шебалков; 30 October 1921 – 17 June 1980) was a Red Army senior sergeant and a Hero of the Soviet Union. Shebalkov was awarded the title on 24 March 1945 for his actions during the capture of Inowrocław during January 1945. He captured the commander of German troops in the city and with his squad killed numerous German soldiers. Shebalkov demobilized after the end of the war and was arrested on charges of writing anti-Soviet letters in 1948. He was stripped of his awards and imprisoned in the Gorlag at Norilsk. After Stalin's death Shebalkov was released and his awards were restored. He worked as a mechanic in Zelenokumsk.

== Early life ==
Shebalkov was born on 30 October 1921 in the village of Gorkaya Balka to a peasant family. He graduated from seven years of school and worked as a Kolkhoz tractor driver. In April 1941, he was drafted into the Red Army. He served with the 37th Tank Regiment in Ternopil Oblast.

== World War II ==
Shebalkov fought in the retreat to the east after Operation Barbarossa, the German invasion of the Soviet Union. He fought in the defense of Kremenchug and Pyriatyn, as well as Poltava Oblast and Kharkov Oblast. In December 1941, Shebalkov fought in the Battle of Rostov. During the summer of 1942 he fought in the Soviet retreat to the east after the German offensive Case Blue. Shebalkov's unit ended in the Battle of Stalingrad, in which he was deputy commander of a reconnaissance platoon with the 15th Motor Rifle Brigade. He fought in the Battle of Kursk and in Ukraine and Romania. Serving in a unit with the 2nd Guards Tank Army, Shebalkov fought in Operation Bagration and the capture of Radom, Lublin, Dęblin, and Garwolin. He was wounded three times. In 1944 he became a Communist Party of the Soviet Union member. On 26 September he was awarded the Medal "For Courage" for actions between March and June.

By January 1945, Shebalkov was a deputy submachine gun squad leader in a motor rifle battalion of the 34th Guards Motor Rifle Brigade of the 12th Guards Tank Corps. He fought in the Vistula–Oder Offensive in January 1945. The battalion advanced ahead of main forces with the brigade's advanced units. On 19 January, during fighting for Radziejów, Shebalkov was reported by his commanding officer to have destroyed German positions blocking the battalion's advance. On 21 January, the battalion along with armored units of the brigade advanced into Inowrocław. Advancing through the streets, Shebalkov captured a fortified building with his squad. He helped capture a German commander's headquarters and a cinema. During the fighting he surprised German officers holding a meeting and captured the city commandant, who took refuge in a sewer. Leading a squad against a battery of anti-tank guns, Shebalkov killed several German soldiers, and with a captured gun destroyed a German tank. On 24 March 1945 Shebalkov was awarded the title Hero of the Soviet Union and the Order of Lenin for his actions.

Shebalkov fought in the East Pomeranian Offensive and the Battle of Berlin. Shebalkov was awarded the Order of the Red Star on 10 April for his actions on 7 March. On 29 April he was wounded during street fighting in Berlin and evacuated to a hospital.

== Postwar ==
In October 1945 Shebalkov was demobilized with the rank of senior sergeant. He returned to his native village and worked as a manager at a cooperative in the Vorontsovo-Aleksandrovskogo District Consumers Union. On 11 April 1948 he was arrested on charges of sending anti-Soviet letters to Communist Party organizations. He was sentenced to a decade-long term of imprisonment and stripped of his awards. Shebalkov was imprisoned in the Norilsk Gorlag camp, where he participated in the Norilsk uprising. In 1954, after Stalin's death, Shebalkov was released and rehabilitated. On 11 November 1957 his awards were restored. He lived in Zelenokumsk and worked as a mechanic at the Elektroapparat Factory, and later in hydropower. Shebalkov died on 17 June 1980 and was buried in Zelenokumsk.
