= Ivan Dolgikh =

Ivan Dolgikh may refer to:

- Ivan Ilyich Dolgikh (1904–1961), Soviet NKVD officer
- Ivan Ivanovich Dolgikh (1896–1956), Soviet NKVD officer
- Ivan Dolgikh (judoka), Russian judoka
