= Shukrullo =

Uzbekistani poet (1921–2020)

Shukrullo Yusupov
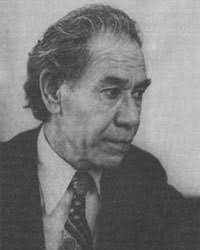
- Shukrullo in 1993
- Born: Shukrullo Yusupov; 2 September 1921; Tashkent, Turkestan ASSR
- Died: 19 July 2020 (aged 98); Tashkent, Uzbekistan
- Occupations: Poet, writer, political figure, translator, and a publicist
- Writing career
- Language: Uzbek
- Genres: Novels, poems, and plays

Shukrullo (pen name of Shukrullo Yusupov; 2 September 1921 – 19 July 2020) was an Uzbek poet-thinker, lyricist, translator, an official (since 1990, presidential council), and a publicist.

== Early life and education ==
Shukrullo Yusupov was born on September 2, 1921, in Tashkent, in the mahallah (quarter) Olmazor. The writer's father, Yusufkhodzha (Yusufhoʻja), was a medicinal practitioner in Tashkent.

In 1938 he graduated from the Pedagogical College and began teaching in Karakalpakstan. In 1944, after graduating from the Tashkent Pedagogical Institute, he entered the postgraduate courses of Central Asian State University (SAGU), specializing in foreign literature. Since 1946, a member of the Union of Writers of the Uzbek SSR. The first collection of poems entitled The Law of Happiness was published in 1949.

== Arrest and imprisonment ==
In 1949 Shukrullo Yusupov was arrested along with a number of famous writers and poets of Uzbekistan Hamid Suleiman, Mirzakolon Ismaili, Shukhrat, brothers Alimukhamedov and Mahmud Muradov. The investigation lasted 15 months and in 1951 he was convicted on charges of nationalism and anti-Soviet activity, sentenced to 25 years in prison and 5 disqualifications. Staged at Gorlag, participated in the Norilsk uprising. Shukhrat, Mirzakalon, Hamid Suleiman were convicted in the same case with him. In September 1954 he was sent to Tashkent to review the case, at the end of 1954 - beginning of 1955 he was released. The arrest, investigation and stay in the camp are described in the autobiographical story Buried without a shroud. The publication of the story became possible only after the collapse of the USSR, in 1991.

In his memoirs, Shukrullo talks about his friendship with a Georgian novelist and a dissident, Chabua Amirejibi. Later, in one of his works, he addressed Shukrullo as "The Conscience of his Nation". They remained friends and continued communicating until the death of Amirejibi in 2013.

== Literary career ==
Shukrullo’s first poetry collection The Law of Happiness (1949) marked his debut. After his release, he returned to writing, developing a unique lyrical voice that combined classical Uzbek poetic forms with modernist sensibilities. His poetry often reflected deep philosophical and spiritual themes, a subtle critique of authoritarianism, and a strong attachment to national identity. His stylistic range included lyrical verse, prose memoirs, dramatic monologues, and essays.

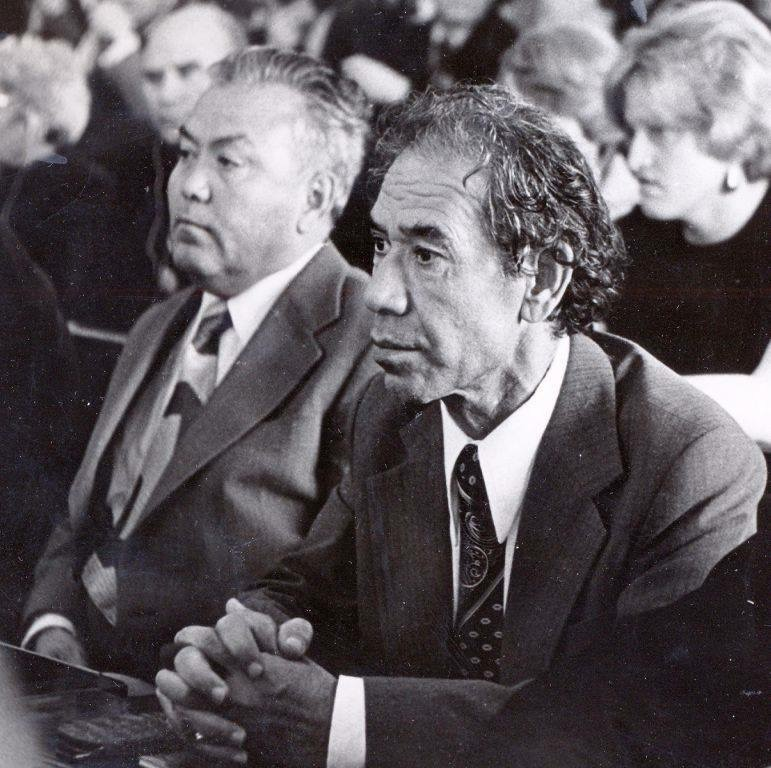
An image of Shukrullo (right) and Odil Yoqubov (left) during the congress of writers of USSR.

Shukrullo was the author of over twenty books, including well-known works such as Light, Tashkent 26, Dialogue of the Century, Dangerous Path, and Your Dreams. His poetry was widely translated into Russian and other foreign languages, contributing significantly to the international visibility of Uzbek literature.

He also worked in the field of artistic translation, rendering into Uzbek the works of major world poets including Heinrich Heine, Carlo Gozzi, Taras Shevchenko, Alexander Blok, and others. In addition to writing, he served in the Union of Writers of the Uzbek SSR, including in its main administrative apparatus. He worked as an editor at the Gafur Gulyam Literature and Art Publishing House, and taught literature in schools.

Despite being honoured as the People’s Poet of Uzbek SSR in 1981 and widely recognized during Soviet and early independence years, Shukrullo remained effectively blacklisted by state-controlled media even into the late 2018s for political remarks and advocacy for the people.

== Recognition and social activity ==
He was an active member of the Union of Writers of Uzbekistan from 1946 and played a key role in shaping literary discourse in the Uzbek SSR and post-independence Uzbekistan.

His poetry has been translated into many languages, and has appeared in magazines and anthologies. He was honored with Uzbekistan's Hamza Award and the title of Uzbekistan People's Poet.

In his memoirs, Shukrullo reflects on the sweeping upheavals brought about by Soviet rule in Central Asia, transformations whose consequences are still felt today. He recounts the collectivization of agriculture, which disrupted traditional rural life, the forced assimilation, including the replacement of the alphabet not once but twice, and the trauma of deportations, imprisonment, and labour camps. These experiences, as narrated in his writings, offer deeply personal insights into how individuals lived through and made sense of such radical change. At the same time, his memoirs serve as a valuable historical resource, allowing readers to reconstruct the Soviet past in Central Asia through the lens of personal memory and lived experience.

Shukrullo was actively involved in educational and civic efforts, particularly youth development, and participated in the ideological and socio-political life of Uzbekistan. He was a member of the Presidential Council of the Uzbek SSR, reflecting his national prominence beyond the literary sphere. He was actively communicating with his friends like Rasul Gamzatov, Rimma Kazakova, Chingiz Aitmatov, Kaisyn Kuliev, Mustai Karim, David Kugultinov, Irakli Abashidze, and Odil Yoqubov.

He was awarded the Order of Friendship of Peoples, multiple honorary diplomas, and state medals in recognition of his literary and civic contributions.

Shukrullo continued to be recognized by international literary circles even while being neglected domestically. His works are celebrated by the Turkic world and post-Soviet bloc.

- In 2016, he was named “Person of the Year in Turkic Literature” by the Eurasian Writers’ Union, awarded at the 7th Congress of Editors of Turkic Literary Publications in Turkistan (Kazakhstan), the cultural capital of the Turkic world that year.
- Many of his works are part of political, historical, and philosophical discussions on past and current affairs of Central Asia. In Western countries, his works serve as a resource to understanding and analysing Russian Empire's and Soviet discoveries and conquest of Central Asia.

== Family ==
His mother, Zaynabkhon, was the sister of the well-known leader of Jadidist movement in Central Asia and one of the founders of the Kokand Autonomy, Ubaydullakhoja Asadullakhodjaev. In his memoirs, he often remembers Ubaydullakhoja and the role he played in developing Uzbek identity. His novel, Living Souls is in remembrance of Ubaydullakhoja and the people who had devoted their lives to fighting for independence. Ubaydulla was a famous lawyer and an advocate. He had communicated with famous Russian writer, Leo Tolstoy on many social problems within the Turkestan region.

His father, Yusufkhoja, was a well-known doctor in Tashkent. Shukrullo has 2 daughters and an only son.

== See also ==
- Daniil Granin
- Sharof Rashidov
