= Aleksandra Zelenskaya =

Soviet political prisoner

- Олександра Матвіївна Зеленська
- Born: 5 April 1927 (age 99); Wołyń Voivodeship, Poland
- Citizenship: Soviet Union
- Movement: Norilsk uprising

Aleksandra Matveena Zelenskaya was a political prisoner in the gulag system of the Soviet Union who was the leader of the Norilsk uprising of the 6th Women's Camp at Gorlag.

== Biography ==
=== Early life ===
Zelenskaya was born in a small village in the Wołyń Voivodeship of Poland (today in Ukraine) called Pustomyty. Ukrainian by nationality, official documents state that she received education through the fourth grade. Born to a peasant family, she worked with her parents farming a personal subsidiary plot of land. Zelenskaya was unaffiliated with any political party.

=== Imprisonment ===
On 23 April 1946, Zelenskaya was arrested after being accused of having a connection to the Ukrainian Insurgent Army. According to camp documents, she supposedly received partisans of the organization into her home and provided them with food and shelter. On 2 July 1946, she was charged under articles 54-1 and 54-11 of the criminal code of the Ukrainian SSR. She was sentenced to ten years in a labor camp and five years suspension of political rights. She was imprisoned in the Peschanlag (ru) camp in Kazakhstan.

On 22 March 1952, Zelenskaya was once again arrested, this time while still in the Peschanlag camp. She was arrested for having "created an anti-Soviet nationalist group in the camp [and] systematically expressed anti-Soviet defeatist fabrications." She was also accused of creating a nationalist Ukrainian flag and a stamp for making anti-Soviet documents. When searched, she was found with a stamp cliche and two prints. Additionally, a homemade flag embroidered with the coat of arms of Ukraine was found under her floorboards. However, the investigation failed to conclusively tie Zelenskaya to the flag's creation. She was suspected of other acts of sabotage, including setting fire to five barracks in the Peschanlag camp, though these allegations were never proven.

=== Norilsk Uprising ===
In September 1952, Zelenskaya was delivered to the 6th Women's Camp at Gorlag. The next summer, the Norilsk uprising began at the camp. The women's camp joined the strike two days after the men's camps, and Zelenskaya became a member of the strike committee during the uprising. On 7 June 1953, with six other members of the strike committee, she presented the demands of the strikers to the commission of the USSR Ministry of Internal Affairs. She proposed the slogan "Freedom or Death" for the strikers.

On 6 July 1953, after the uprising had been put down, Zelenskaya was arrested for her participation in the strike. On 18 January 1954, she was convicted by the camp court at Norillag and sentenced to another five years in prison. On 6 May she was transferred to Krasnoyarsk prison and on 19 November she was transferred to yet another prison in the Kurgan region.

=== After liberation ===
Little is known about Zelenskaya's life after she was liberated from prison. Mikhailo Bakanchuk, another member of the Norilsk uprising, claimed that in 2001 she was living in the Ivano-Frankivsk region. Irena Machulskaya, who participated in the uprising in the female camp, believed that until at least 2005 Zelenskaya was living somewhere in eastern Ukraine. Her further fate is not documented.
