= List of uprisings in the Gulag =

This is an incomplete list of uprisings in the Gulag:

- Akukan mine uprising, 1930
- Parbig uprising near Narym, 1931
- Ust-Usa uprising, 1942
- Kolyma rebellion, 1946
- Vorkuta uprising, 1948
- Nizhni Aturyakh (Russian: Нижний Атурях) subcamp of Berlag, uprising, 1949
- Ekibastuz strike, 1952
- Norilsk uprising, 1953
- Vorkuta uprising, 1953
- Kengir uprising, 1954
