= MVD special camp =

Type of Gulag camps

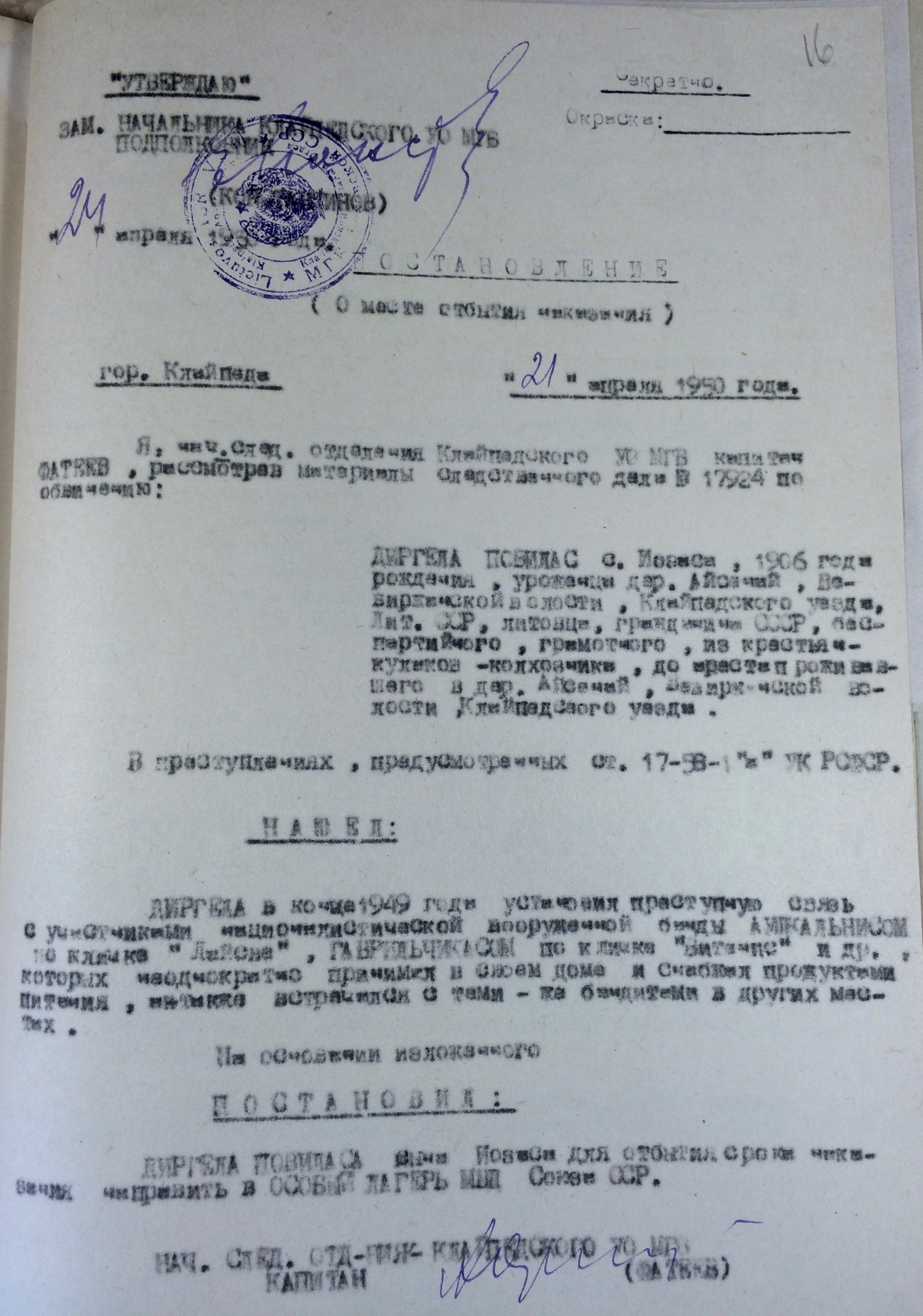
A Russian signed document to send the convict to MVD special camp

MVD special camps of the Gulag (Russian: Особые лагеря МВД, особлаги, osobye lagerya, osoblags) was a system of special labor camps established addressing the February 21, 1948 decree 416—159сс of the USSR Council of Ministers of February 28 decree 00219 of the Soviet Ministry of Internal Affairs exclusively for a "special contingent" of political prisoners, convicted according to the more severe sub-articles of Article 58 (Enemies of people): treason, espionage, terrorism, etc., for various political opponents, such as Trotskyists, nationalists, and white émigrés, etc. (Note: from the decree no. 00219 : "шпионов, диверсантов, террористов, троцкистов, правых, меньшевиков, эсеров, анархистов, националистов, белоэмигрантов и участников других антисоветских организаций и групп и лиц, представляющих опасность по своим антисоветским связям и вражеской деятельности." (spies, saboteurs, terrorists, Trotskyists, rightists, Mensheviks, Socialist Revolutionaries, anarchists, nationalists, white émigrés and members of other anti-Soviet organizations and groups and individuals who pose a danger due to their anti-Soviet connections and hostile activities)) It was forbidden to keep other types of convicts in these camps.

== History ==
Initially, in February 1948, five osoblags were established, nameless, numbered from 1 to 5. Later, they were given codenames, accordingly, Mineralny Минеральный (Minlag), Gorny Горный (Gorlag), Dubravny Дубравный (Dubravlag), Stepnoy Степной (Steplag) and Beregovoy Береговой (Berlag). Russian political prisoner and writer Georgy Demidov notices that this naming was arbitrary, unlike regular Gulag camps, which were commonly named after geographical features or major occupation.

Later the following osoblags were created: Rechnoy Речной (Rechlag, August 1948), Ozyorny Озерный (Ozyorlag/Ozerlag, December 1948, Песчаный (Peschanlag), Луговой (Luglag), Камышовый (Kamyshlag), Дальний (Dallag, Ekibastuz, distinguish from Dallag, Far East), and Водораздельный (Vodorazdellag).

In 1954, after the death of Stalin, most of them were reorganized into regular corrective labor camps.

MVD special camps were places of the three largest Gulag uprisings: Norilsk uprising, Vorkuta uprising, and Kengir uprising.

== See also ==
- Special camp (disambiguation), for other types of Soviet special camps
