= Kengir uprising =

1954 Gulag prisoner revolt in Kazakh SSR

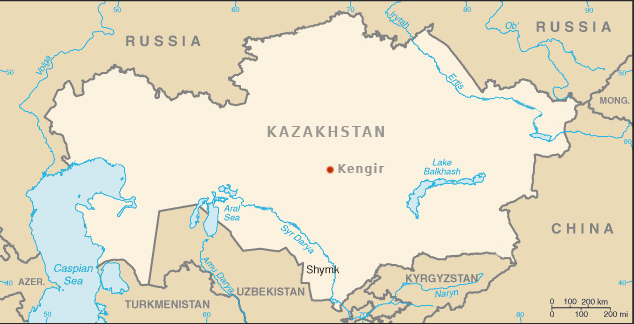
- Location of Kengir in Kazakhstan
| Date | 16 May 1954 – 26 June 1954 |
| Location | Kengir, Steplag, Kazakh SSR 47°50′24″N 67°36′58″E |
| Result | Uprising suppressed |

Belligerents
| Soviet Union; Soviet Army; MVD; Gulag authorities | Kengir resistance |

Commanders and leaders
| (Soviet Union) Sergei Yegorov (Soviet Union) Ivan Dolgikh | Kapiton Kuznetsov (POW); Yuriy Knopmus (executed) |

Strength
| 1,700 | 5,200 |

Casualties and losses
| 40 wounded | Per USSR: 37 killed, 106 wounded Per prisoners: 500–700 killed/wounded |

The Kengir uprising was a prisoner rebellion that occurred in Kengir (Steplag), a Soviet MVD special camp for political prisoners, during May and June 1954. Its duration and intensity distinguished it from other Gulag rebellions during the same period, such as the Vorkuta uprising and Norilsk uprising.

After the murder of some of their fellow prisoners by guards, Kengir inmates rebelled and seized the entire camp compound, holding it for weeks and creating a period of freedom for themselves unique in the history of the Gulag. Through a rare alliance between criminals and political prisoners, inmates created a self-contained compound by forcing guards and camp administration to flee the camp. They thereafter built intricate defenses to prevent the incursion of the authorities into their newly won territory. This situation lasted for an unprecedented length of time and resulted in novel activity, including the formation of a provisional government by the prisoners, prisoner marriages, the performance of religious ceremonies, and the waging of a propaganda campaign against the erstwhile authorities.

After 40 days of freedom within the camp walls, intermittent negotiation, and mutual preparation for violent conflict, the rebellion was suppressed by Soviet armed forces with tanks and guns on the morning of 26 June. According to former prisoners, five hundred to seven hundred people were killed or wounded by the suppression, although official figures claim only a few dozen had been killed. The story of the rebellion was first committed to history in The Gulag Archipelago, a work by former Gulag prisoner and Nobel Prize-winning Russian author Aleksandr Solzhenitsyn, using former Kengir prisoners as sources.

== Background ==
=== Changes in the Gulag ===
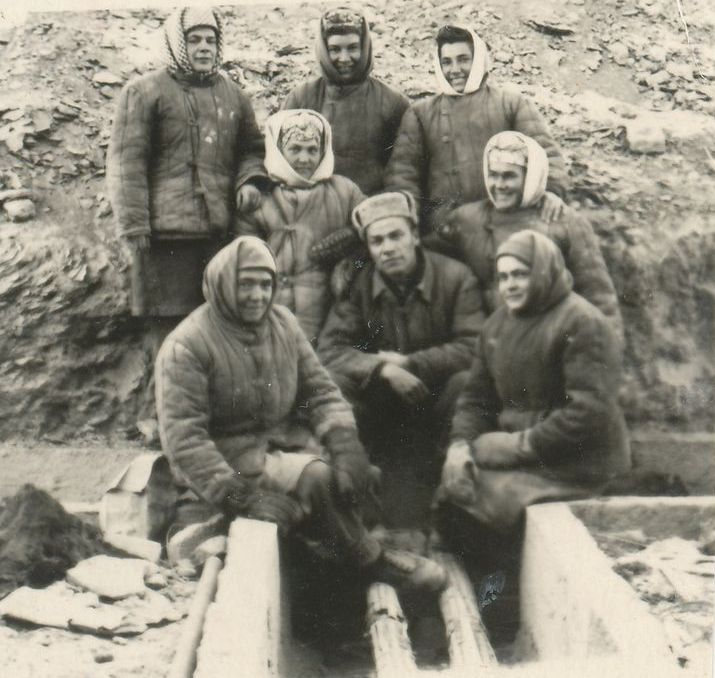
A group of political prisoners in Kengir (1949–1956).

A year before the rebellion, the Soviet dictator Joseph Stalin died. His death aroused great hopes among the prisoners of amnesty or at least prison reform, and this hope was further emboldened by the subsequent arrest of Stalin's former state security chief, Lavrenty Beria. Beria, who was the chief of the entire Soviet security and police apparatus and architect of some of the most hated policies relating to the camps, was declared an "enemy of the people" and executed by those who succeeded Stalin. Beria's newly discredited name became a liability to others in both the upper and lower echelons of the Soviet hierarchy, and anybody who had been associated with or spoken too much in favour of Beria was similarly at risk of being denounced as a traitor and persecuted. The camp administration were not excluded from this risk, and this fact weakened their authority vis à vis the prisoners. Writing about the strikes which were occurring at the time, Solzhenitsyn described this issue:

They had no idea what was required of them and mistakes could be dangerous! If they showed excessive zeal and shot down a crowd they might end up as henchmen of Beria. But if they weren't zealous enough, and didn't energetically push the strikers out to work — exactly the same thing could happen.

Prisoners all over the Gulag, for this reason and others, were becoming increasingly bold and impudent during the months preceding the rebellion, with hunger strikes, work stoppages, large-scale insubordination, and punitive violence becoming more and more common. In Kengir in particular, camp authorities were rapidly losing control of their charges, and the communiqués periodically sent by commanders up the camp hierarchy, in which they expressed their dismay at the frequent incidents of unrest, powerful underground organizations, the growing "crisis" afflicting their network of informants, and their desperate attempts to reassert control, attest to this.

=== Kengir ===
==== Thieves ====
The rebellion's causes can be traced back to a large arrival of "thieves" – the accepted slang term for the habitual criminals who were also imprisoned in Gulag along with the political prisoners. Traditionally, thieves and politicals had been antagonists, with the thieves exercising virtually unchecked dominance over the politicals, robbing and abusing them at will, and with the politicals remaining too disunited to muster a credible defense. This situation was facilitated by a variably complacent or actively encouraging camp administration, which recognized the value of discouraging the thieves and politicals from uniting with a common cause. Indeed, the infusion of about 650 thieves into the approximately 5,200-strong body of political prisoners at Kengir at the beginning of May was specifically for this purpose, as the Kengir prisoners had organized strikes before on a smaller scale and were becoming increasingly restless. The camp authorities hoped that these thieves would, as they had in the past, help reverse this trend.

==== Informers ====
While the Gulag labour camps were established during the early 1920s, only during the early 1950s were the politicals and 'thieves' finally separated into different camp systems. With the thieves absent, the politicals began to unite in ways unprecedented in Gulag camps. The inmates organized as national, religious, and ethnic groups (Ukrainians, Kazakhs, Chechens, Armenians, Latvians, Estonians, Lithuanians, Muslims, Christians, etc.) and began murdering camp informers or prisoners who otherwise colluded with the camp administration. The informers had kept their identities secret and denounced fellow prisoners, causing them to distrust each other, but the national and ethnic groups killed so many of them that the remaining, unidentified informers fled to the camp administration for protection.

==== Weaponry and organization ====
Of these above-mentioned ethnic blocs, the Ukrainians, many of whom were exiled members of the Organization of Ukrainian Nationalists (by some estimates comprising more than half of the camps' population) were the most important, and they quickly asserted a commanding role among the prisoners. Members of this "Ukrainian Centre", as it was often called, were the primary proponents of killing informers and later would prove essential to dealing with the newly arrived thieves.

Along with this effective elimination of informers, the prisoners began fashioning shivs, which were previously the exclusive possession of thieves. In addition, many incidents occurred (usually including the wanton murder of some well-liked prisoner by guards) during the previous months that came to increase resentment and justify extreme action on behalf of the prisoners. Protests and collective refusals to work were increasing in frequency and the prisoners were learning how to plan and maintain large-scale disturbances, mainly by creating systems of communication between camp divisions and establishing command hierarchies.

Into this changed situation the thieves were injected and, to the surprise of the camp authorities, they joined forces with the politicals, meeting secretly on the first night with the Ukrainian Centre and establishing a pact. This was due both to the fact that they recognized their odds against the almost 5,200 strong body of well-armed and united political prisoners, and because thieves across the whole Gulag had learned of the politicals' campaign against the informers and began to respect them for it.

==== The camp compound ====
The entire Kengir camp complex formed a large rectangle, divided width-wise into four distinct areas: the women's camp, the "service yard", where all the workshops and storerooms were located, and two camps for men, each with its own jailhouse for punishing prisoners or hiding informers. The women's camp was blocked off both from access and sight to the men's camp.

== Seizing of the camp ==
The formative stage of the rebellion began on the evening of 16 May 1954, a Sunday and thus a day of rest for all the prisoners. The thieves contrived to break into the service yard, where the food was stored, and from there break into the women's camp, which was easier to do from that location. They did this initially, but they were soon chased away by guards. At nightfall, though, the thieves regrouped, shot out all of the lights in range with their slingshots, and broke through the barrier between the men's camp and service yard with an improvised battering ram. It was at this time the Kengir rebellion proper started when the guards began shooting at the thieves, killing 13 and wounding 43.

The remaining thieves retreated and an uneasy peace followed. During the night, though, thieves, now joined by the politicals, started breaking up their bunks and cells, trying to add to their cache of shivs and arm those without weapons, while the camp authorities posted machine gunners at the hole in the wall. After a tense standoff, the camp authorities, in a surprise gesture, ordered the withdrawal of all guards from the compound.

This was actually a tactical response by the authorities. The next day they feigned acquiescence to the prisoners' demands and, while the prisoners then agreeably went to work outside the camp, the guards busied themselves repairing the broken-down wall. Nevertheless, this was arguably an error on their part because it exposed the bad faith of the guards and eliminated all remaining trust the prisoners had in their word. More importantly, though, the prisoners had, for one whole day, had total freedom (within the confines of the camp compound), mingling freely with the female prisoners, eating their fill, and fraternizing as they pleased, and this put in them a desire for freedom that would not be so easily quenched.

During this time, the first propaganda about the rebellion was released by the camp authorities (they re-enacted, in full prisoner costume, the alleged rape of the women prisoners and photographed themselves, releasing the photographs and declaring that the revolt was in fact a disguise for debauchery and hedonism).

When the prisoners became aware of these tricks, they reasserted themselves, sending the guards fleeing from the camp again. They then proceeded to re-destroy the wall that had just been repaired and release the prisoners from the camp's solitary confinement cells. The camp had been seized and would remain in the control of the prisoners for the next 40 days.

== Camp society post-rebellion ==
=== Culture ===
With the entire camp at their disposal, and with feelings of fellowship and good-will in abundance, prisoners began to enjoy some of the joys of normal life which had been denied to them. As Solzhenitsyn and others retold, men and women from different camp divisions who had romantically conversed secretly for years, but had never seen each other, finally met. Imprisoned priests presided over a number of improvised weddings. Prisoners retrieved what remained of their civilian clothing from the storeroom (the guards regularly stole and sold prisoners' items), and soon prisoners were seen adorned with fur coats and assorted colourful clothing, in addition to the religious wear that had been banned. Business, as well, resumed as best it could, with one Russian aristocrat opening a "café" serving ersatz "coffee", which proved to be quite popular with the prisoners.

Soon a number of organized recreational activities began. Because of the large number of political prisoners in the Gulag, almost every camp had a selection of engineers, scientists, intellectuals, and artists, who gave lectures to other inmates. Poetry recitals and even hastily prepared plays were performed. Hymns, composed by the Ukrainians, were performed en masse.

One hymn in particular, with its simultaneously mournful and celebratory theme and its demand for freedom, is a good example of the prevailing themes in the works produced during the rebellion:

We will not, we will not be slaves
We will not, we will not carry the yoke any longer.

In addition to the renewed presence of religious regalia, religious practices were also given new life. Notably, one of the religious sects massed at the original hole broken into the dividing wall on the first night of the rebellion, claiming that their prophet had predicted its destruction and the freedom that followed. They, according to former prisoners, then sat on mattresses for several days by the hole, praying and waiting to be taken to heaven.

=== Government ===
Soon after the camp was captured, the prisoners congregated in the mess hall and decided to elect a commander, and a former Red Army Lieutenant colonel, Kapiton Kuznetsov, was chosen. A major reason for this choice was that the Ukrainian Center insisted on having Russian command of the rebellion and, indeed, on having the entire government be as multiethnic and multinational as possible. This was done mainly to avoid the appearance of the rebellion being anti-Russian in character, but also as an attempt to create a harmonious camp society and government.

Kuznetsov and his administration were originally delegated to perform negotiations with the camp authorities on behalf of the prisoners, but as the prisoners' control of the camp lasted beyond expectation and as demand for law, order, and efficiency increased, the jurisdiction of this government increased. Therefore, various departments were quickly created; Agitprop, Services and Maintenance, Food, Internal Security, Defence, and the Technical Department were among some of them.

==== Propaganda ====
The first expansion of the government's authority came as a natural extension of its role as representative of the prisoners: propaganda. A theme was carefully set by Kuznetsov and taken over by his deputy, Yuriy Knopmus. The theme crucially undercut the main argument that would have been used by the camp authorities to end the rebellion, which was that the rebellion was anti-Soviet in nature. Instead, Knopmus schemed to portray the guards as supporters of the recently deposed Lavrentiy Beria and the rebellion as a patriotic action against them. Soon placards were raised declaring such sentiments as "Long live the Soviet constitution!" and "Down with murdering Beria-ites!"

As the new state of affairs continued, the Propaganda department's activities grew. At first they were all largely defensive in intent — literally just responding to allegations hurled at them across the fence. The guards broadcast propaganda by loudspeaker into the camp, urging surrender and decrying the loss of days of valuable prison labor and the alleged detrimental effect it was having on the Soviet economy. In response, the prisoners, using a modified loudspeaker, broadcast back a whole set of mock radio programmes, complete with comedy programs and skits, written by the Agitation and Propaganda department and announced by a charismatic female prisoner. One of the guard's stenographers recorded some of the broadcasts, and these records made their way into the Soviet archives. An excerpt of one broadcast:

Comrade Soldiers! We are not afraid of you, and we ask you not to come into our zone. Don't shoot at us, don't buckle under the will of the Beria-ites! We are not afraid of them just as we are not afraid of death. We would rather die of hunger in this camp than give up to the Beria-ite band! Don't soil your hands with the same dirty blood which your officers have on their hands!

Later, with the help of the Technical Department, their schemes became increasingly ambitious. The prisoners, realizing the precariousness of their situation, endeavored to publicize their rebellion and demands to the village adjacent to the camp, hoping to incite its citizens to assist them. To do this, they first employed specially rigged, hot air balloons with slogans written on them which were shot down and, later, kites manufactured by the Chechens, who turned out to be kite specialists. The kites were successful for a time. During favorable winds, they dropped packets of leaflets to the settlements below, but the authorities soon sent up kites to tangle the prisoners' kite's lines. Eventually the prisoners fixed leaflets to carrier pigeons, releasing dozens into the air.

==== Defense ====
Along with propaganda, defense came to the fore of the new government's list of priorities. Before the exiled camp authorities stopped the camp's electricity, the smiths and machinists (lathe-operators) in the camp fashioned all manner of weaponry in the service yard's workshops — long pikes from prison bars, sabers, staves, and clubs amongst them. In addition to this, the prisoners ground glass into dust and placed buckets of this dust throughout the camp, hoping to blind oncoming troops with it. Barricades were established in important places, and responsibility for manning them was divided amongst the camp barracks (renamed "detachments" by the Defense department), with set shifts and procedures.

The Technical Department contributed to this effort as well, namely by creating improvised explosive devices and incendiary bombs, both of which, according to Solzhenitsyn, were used during the actual invasion in June, the latter bringing down a guard tower.

==== Technical Department ====
In addition to the above-mentioned innovations, the Technical Department dealt with many other problems. When the exiled camp authorities stopped the camp's electrical supply, the electricians among the prisoners siphoned electricity from the wires passing overhead just outside the perimeter fence. This too was terminated by the authorities after a few days, and thereafter the prisoners used a modified motor as a generator and even improvised a running tap "hydroelectric station" to supply power to the government headquarters and medical barracks.

== Negotiations ==
Negotiations between the authorities and rebels began almost immediately, as was becoming the custom with prisoner disturbances, but were fraught with difficulty from the beginning. The camp authorities again immediately acquiesced to virtually all of the prisoners demands, but this time, with the past deceit still fresh in their minds, the prisoners did not accept this solution as sufficient and demanded a written agreement. A draft was composed by the authorities and passed around the camp. Negotiations then recessed until higher-ranking officers arrived on the site. Solzhenitsyn explained:

Golden-epauleted personages, in various combinations, continued coming in the camp to argue and persuade. They were all allowed in, but they had to pick up white flags […] and undergo a body search. They showed the generals around, […] let them talk to prisoners, and called big meetings in the Camp Divisions for their benefit. Their epaulets flashing, the bosses took their seats in the presidium as of old, as though nothing were amiss.

To these generals and others were presented the same set of demands: punishment of the soldiers responsible for the murder of various prisoners and beating of women prisoners; that prisoners who had been transferred to other camps as punishment for participating in a strike be brought back; that prisoners no longer had to wear degrading number patches or be locked into their dormitories at night; that the walls separating camp divisions (namely between the men's and women's camps) not be rebuilt; that an eight-hour work day be instituted; that limits be ended for the number of letters they could send and receive; that certain hated camp guards and officials be removed from Kengir; and that, most importantly, their cases be reviewed.

None of these demands were unconstitutional. All of the prisoner's demands were accounted for in the original regulation; the prisoners were asking for the enforcement of their rights.

The generals, now with Sergei Yegorov, deputy chief of the MVD, and Ivan Dolgikh, division commander of Gulag, among them, once again agreed to the prisoners' demands, but, still failing to match a written contract to their words, they were once again rejected by the prisoners.

The discussions then degenerated into threats and counter-threats. The prisoners, due to a lack of trust in their current negotiating partners, demanded that a member of the Central Committee be sent and this was refused.

=== Sowing discord ===
Prior to the raid, attempts were made by the camp authorities to cause violence within the camp, both so that the prisoners would attack each other and make the job easier for the invading troops, and to provide an ostensible justification for the armed intervention that was to come. Direct requests were made to high-ranking prisoners that they "provoke racial bloodbath" in exchange for leniency. Relying on the then existing paranoia and distrust of Jews in Russia, the authorities also attempted to spread rumors in the camp that a pogrom was imminent.

While these efforts largely failed, another objective of the authorities — to draw out orthodox Communists and Soviet loyalists — was successful and a number of them fled the camp in the days before the raid, including a high-ranking member of the prisoner's government who would later urge surrender by the guards' loudspeakers. Nevertheless, this outflow was quickly halted by Internal Security, who captured those speaking favorably of the authorities or of surrender and locked them in the camp's jail.

== Suppression ==
=== Prelude ===
During the days prior to the raid, small incursions were made. First, this was done to test the preparedness and defensive capabilities of the prisoners — alarms were sounded and prisoners quickly assumed battle positions — but later it was done for the sake of photography. This footage later became important to the authorities in their effort to identify and punish all those who participated directly with the uprising, as well as secure their justification for the raid.

At this time, the morale of the prisoners was falling. Many came to have a sense of the futility of their struggle, and this proved infectious. The leader of the prisoners, Kuznetsov, even betrayed his pessimism in a speech, retold by Solzhenitsyn:

"Comrades", the majestic Kuznetsov said confidently, as though he knew many secrets, and all to the advantage of the prisoners, "we have defensive firepower, and the enemy will suffer fifty percent of our own losses!" […] "Even our destruction will not be in vain."

The day before the raid, the guards' loudspeakers announced that the prisoners' demand to meet with a member of the Central Committee was to be granted. This had the effect of lowering the prisoners' guard and reducing hostility to and suspicion of the camp authorities. In addition, Solzhenitsyn recalls that the prisoners heard for days before the raid what they thought were the sounds of tractors running on the distance, out of sight. It turned out that the noise of the tractors was being used to conceal the sounds of tanks - which the prisoners did not anticipate would be used against them - as they were moved into position.

=== The raid ===
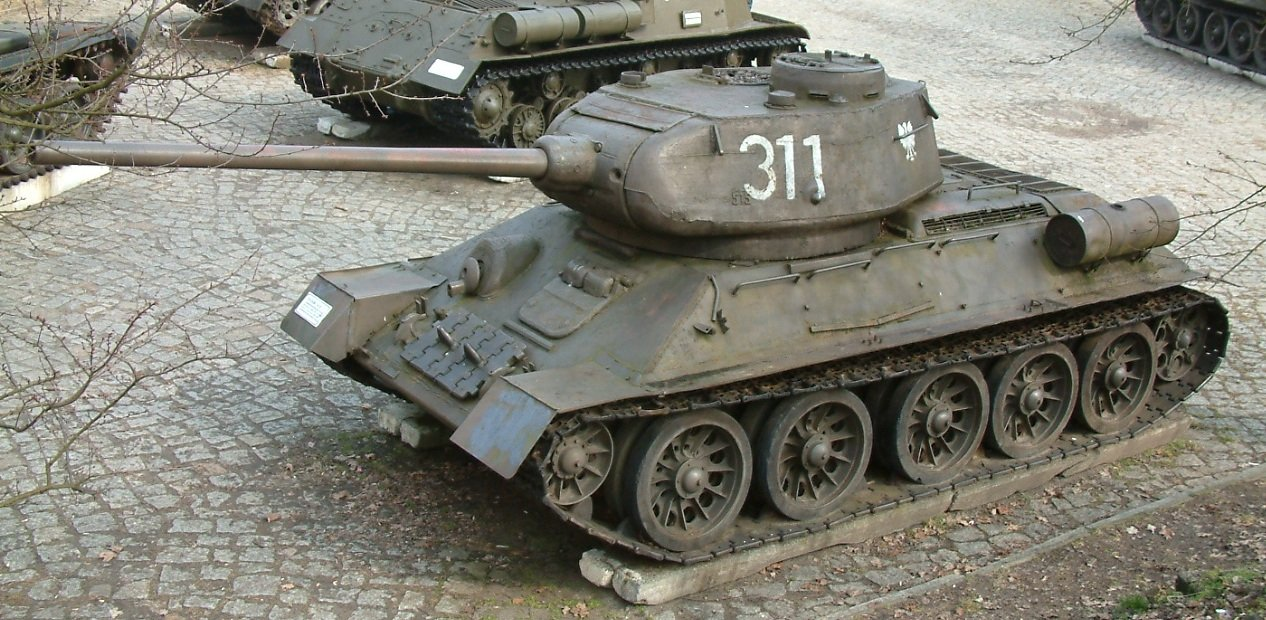
T-34 tanks were used to help end the rebellion, bringing in barbed wire-laden trestles and firing blank shells to stoke confusion and fear.

At 3:30 AM on June 26, flares were shot up into the sky and the raid began. Snipers quickly shot the sentries on the rooftops before they could sound the alarm, and the tanks rolled through the perimeter fence. Five tanks, 90 dogs, and 1,700 troops in battle-gear stormed the camp complex.

Panic and chaos followed. While some 'detachments' vigorously fought back, throwing improvised sulfur bombs at the tanks despite heavy losses, other prisoners hid or committed suicide. The tanks, T-34s, alternately ran over prisoners or brought down barrack walls where prisoners were hiding, and used blank rounds of ammunition to strike terror and confusion into the prisoners. The hundreds of Soviet soldiers used live ammunition, and many prisoners were killed. Some tanks carried in barbed wire-laden trestles, and these were immediately set down as a means of quickly dividing up the camp and hindering the prisoners' freedom of movement. The commanders of the rebellion were specifically targeted by designated squads of soldiers and they were taken into custody alive; many of them were later tried and executed. After ninety minutes of violence, the remaining live prisoners, most of whom were in hiding, were ordered to come out on the promise that they would not be shot.

=== Aftermath ===
According to a number of survivors of the camp, five to seven hundred prisoners were either killed or wounded in the rebellion, with an additional six of the highest-ranking prisoners later being executed, Knopmus among them. Notes found in the Soviet archives, though, claim that only 37 were killed, not including those who later died of their wounds or were executed, and with 106 prisoners and 40 soldiers wounded. Kuznetsov, however, had his death sentence commuted to 25 years and found himself released and fully rehabilitated after 5 years of imprisonment. Theories abound as to why, but most attribute this to the detailed 43-page confession he wrote in which he denounced scores of fellow prisoners. This confession also proved to be an invaluable source for many of the studies performed on the Kengir rebellion, although some question its veracity.

In keeping with the prevailing theme of their story, the camp administration is said to have planted weapons on the corpses of those who didn't already have them for the sake of the photographers, who were brought in expressly for this purpose. On the day after the raid, almost a thousand prisoners were shipped away to different camps and the remaining prisoners were occupied with the task of, once again, rebuilding the destroyed wall, sealing themselves back into imprisonment.

== Significance ==
Among the strikes and rebellions that were occurring in Gulags across the USSR in this period, the rebellion at Kengir was perhaps the most significant. While Stalin's death, Lavrentiy Beria's arrest, and Nikita Khrushchev's rise bore much promise for the prisoners, who had long expected general amnesties and rehabilitation to follow these events, the role of the Kengir rebellion in hastening this process cannot be overlooked. The rebellion further demonstrated to the authorities that Stalinism was not a sustainable policy option and that mass injustices such as those occurring in the Gulag would have a significant cost. In a shift that boded poorly for the Soviet regime, many of the prisoners took part knowing full well that they were doing so at the cost of their lives, and prisoners in other camps, namely in the nearby Rudnik camp, had joined with the Kengir prisoners in solidarity, beginning their own short-lived strikes.

The significance of the temporary freedom enjoyed by those prisoners was not lost on many. In a 1978 review of Solzhenitsyn's book, Hilton Kramer of The New York Times declared that the rebellion "restored a measure of humane civilization to the prisoners before the state was able to assert its implacable power again." At a 2004 reunion of Kengir prisoners, a survivor of the camp mentioned that, despite the brutality and loss of life that came with the rebellion's suppression, the 40 days engendered in the prisoners "a great feeling of freeing one's spirit", and another prisoner recalled that "I had not before then, and have not since, felt such a sense of freedom as I did then" – both sentiments stated by Solzhenitsyn. Indeed, Solzhenitsyn later dedicated a screenplay he had written to the bravery of the Kengir rebels, entitled Tanks Know the Truth (Знают истину танки). (Note: In the late 80's, rumors spread that émigré movie director Andrzej Wajda would make a movie based on said screenplay. He was reportedly interested, but was worried doing so would make enemies in Poland's at-the-time communist government.)

Most remarkably, as George Mason University historian Steven A. Barnes noted in a 2005 edition of Slavic Review, the prisoners' campaign was performed with a certain pragmatism, and their propaganda with a degree of skill, that was all but unprecedented. As noted, instead of making explicit their hostility to the Soviet regime and giving an excuse to the authorities to invade, they ostensibly expressed approval of the state while, meekly, asking for the restoration of the rights and privileges afforded to them in the Soviet constitution. This message was itself spread not only to the camp authorities and any of the MVD officials that would visit the camp for negotiations, but, crucially, to the civilian population surrounding the camp. Before the authorities came up with the idea of using their own rival kites to tangle and bring down the prisoners' kites with, they kept a large retinue of guards and warders, on horseback and motorcycle, waiting for the leaflets to be dropped from the kites so that they could, literally, chase down and retrieve them before they could be read by members of the public. The tact, cohesion, and ingenuity displayed in the rebellion was troubling to the authorities.

Nevertheless, any potential effect the rebellion could have had was limited by the nature of the Soviet regime, which was quick to use massive force. In the same Times review, Kramer issued an important caveat to his previous claim:

…Solzhenitsyn harbors no illusions about what was possible in the way of resistance… he knows very well how little they could achieve without the support of public opinion – something the Soviet state waged constant war on. "Without that behind us", he writes, "we can protest and fast as much as we like and they will laugh in our faces!" And yet the protests persisted – and still persist – because human dignity required them.

== See also ==
- List of uprisings in the Gulag
- Bitch Wars
- Russian mafia
- Novocherkassk massacre
- List of Gulag camps
