= Vekshin =

Vekshin or Vekšin (Russian: Векшин) is a Russian masculine surname, its feminine counterpart is Vekshina. It may refer to

- Daria Vekshina (born 1985), Russian volleyball player
- Nikolai Vekšin (1887–1951), Estonian Olympic sailor (1928)
