= Odil =

Odil may refer to:

== People with the forename ==
- Odil Ahmedov (born 1987), Uzbek football player
- Odil Irgashev (born 1977), Tajikistani football player
- Odil Yakubov (died 2009), Uzbek novelist
