= Akokan =

Akokan may refer to:

- Akokan, Niger, a mining town in Niger
- Akokan (album), an album by Roberto Fonseca

== See also ==
- A misspelling for Akukan mine, an abandoned Russian mining and Gulag labor camp site
