= Ivan Ivanovich Dolgikh =

Soviet NKVD officer (1896–1956)

Ivan Ivanovich Dolgikh (Russian: Иван Иванович Долгих) (13 July 1896 – 1956) was a Soviet NKVD officer and an administrator in the Gulag and one of the officials held responsible for the Nazino tragedy, which resulted in cannibalism by starving prisoners.

== Early career ==
Dolgikh was born in Barnaul, the son of a Russian worker, his education ended when he was sent to do manual work in a workshop, at 11, only barely literate. His father died in 1910. His mother left for Harbin in 1911, and did not return. Drafted in 1915, he was promoted to sergeant major and decorated for bravery during the war between Russia and Germany. Demobilised after the Bolshevik Revolution, he worked as a tin smith in Barnaul, and joined the Left Socialist-Revolutionaries. He joined the Red Army as a volunteer in May 1918, and fought as a partisan in the Altai region. Captured by the White army of Admiral Kolchak in October 1918, he was held in Barnaul prison for five months. After his release, he returned to his old trade as a tin smith, but rejoined the Red Army for the final campaign of the civil war, against the army of Baron Wrangel in the Crimea. He joined the Communist Party of the Soviet Union in 1920, and was recruited to the political police, or Ogpu, in Altai region in the same year. He was in charge of Barnaul prison in 1926-28. In 1928, he was appointed head of the administrative department of the Barnaul Ogpu.

== 'Cannibal Island' ==
In 1931, during the collectivisation of agriculture, when hundreds of thousands of peasants who classed as Kulaks, or who resisted being forced to join collective farms, were rounded up and deported to Siberia, Dolgikh was appointed head of the Western Siberia Department of Special Settlements, in charge of 300,000 deportees. The area he controlled was divided into thirty administrative districts, the most northerly of which was Alexandro-Vakhovskaya, an area of about 50,000 square km (19,000 square miles) straddling the Ob River, accessible only by riverboat from May to October. Before collectivisation, the area had a population of around 4,000, of whom a third where Ostyaks. In February 1933, the local Ogpu commander received an order telling him to receive 25,000 deportees. Unable to cope with the numbers, the Ogpu deposited about 6,000 deportees on Nazino, an island on the Ob river, with inadequate food. More than 4,000 died. At least a dozen resorted to mutilating and eating human bodies. Dolgikh headed a commission sent to investigate, on 21 June. In his report, he denied that the cannibals had been motivated by hunger, but blamed "individual degeneracy and very well-defined political intentions.", and he accused local officials of exaggerating the death toll. After a second commission had been sent in October to investigate the affair, Dolgikh received a 'severe reprimand', while other, more junior officers were arrested.

== Later career ==
Despite his reprimand, Dolgikh continued to have a successful career in the police. In 1935, he led an unprecedented mass climb up Belukha Mountain, the highest peak in Altai province, at 4,620m (15,157 feet). Forty three members of the party reached the summit.

In April 1939, Dolgikh was appointed head of Vyatlag, one the largest labour camps in the Gulag system, which held up to 20,000 prisoners. During the war with Germany, he ran another camp, in Sverdlovsk province. In 1944, he was made deputy head of the administration for prisoners of war. He retired through illness in 1951.

== Note ==
The similarly named Ivan Ilyich Dolgikh was also an NKVD officer, and head of Gulag.
