= Grigory Kirdetsov =

Russian and Soviet writer, journalist, and translator

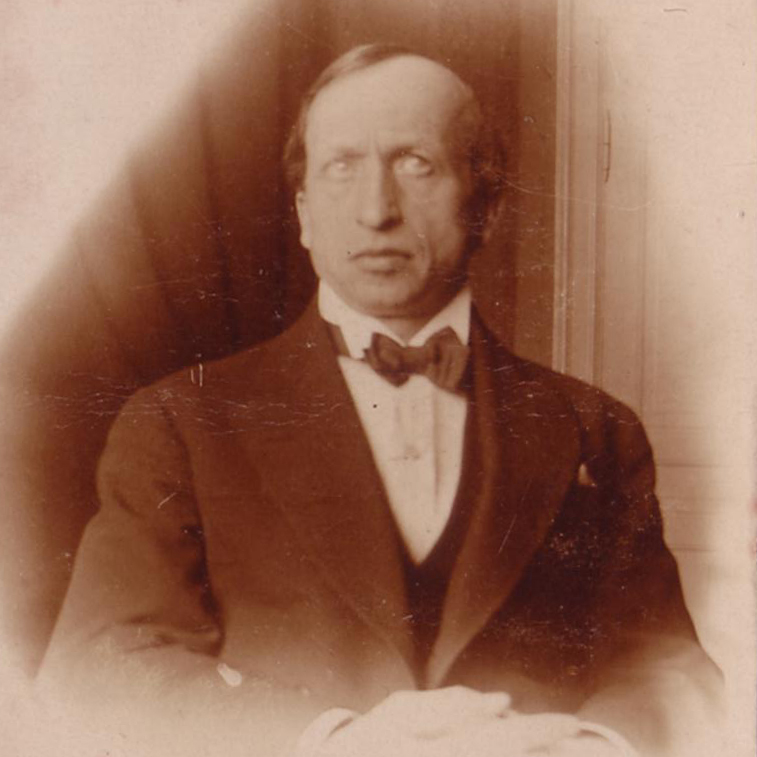
Grigory Kirdetsov, Berlin 1924

Grigory Lvovich Kirdetsov (Russian: Григорий Львович Кирдецов; Luga, Saint Petersburg Governorate, Russian Empire, 1880 – presumably Norillag, not before 1940) was a Russian and Soviet writer, journalist, and translator. Of Jewish extraction, his real name was possibly Lev (Leyba) Dvoretsky (Russian: Лев (Лейба) Дворецкий) or Dvorzhetsky (Russian: Дворжецкий), and he was also known by the pseudonym J. E. Fitz Patrick (Russian: И.Э. Фиц-Патрик). He was initially a supporter of the White movement, being an active propagandist in Yudenich's short-lived Regional Government of Northwest Russia, before moving on to Berlin, where he threw his lot with the smenovekhovtsy, eventually returning to Soviet Russia.

At some point in his early life Kirdetsov moved to Italy, studying law in Rome and also teaching Russian at the Berlitz School in Turin. From 1906 he became the St. Petersburg correspondent for Avanti!, being briefly arrested during the aftermath of the Revolution of 1905. Shortly after his release he returned to Italy, where he translated a number of works from Italian into for Russian publishing houses, among them Antonio Labriola's Reformism and Sindicalism. From 1910 and during the First World War he was a correspondent for the newspaper Birzhevye vedomosti ("Stock exchange journal") in Copenhagen.

Kirdetsov also worked for a variety of publications in pre-revolutionary Russia, including Mir Bozhiy, Vestnik Evropy, Russkaya volya and the Jewish Encyclopedia. In the fall of 1917, with the outbreak of the October Revolution, he evacuated his stepson, Count Konstantin Pavlovich Borodin (20 October 1907, Saint Petersburg – 28 March 2007, Brussels, Belgium) from Saint Petersburg. In the spring of 1918, he left Bolshevik-held territory himself, moving to Revel, where from July 1918 he edited Svobodnaya Rossiya ("Free Russia"), the official organ of the North-Western Government of general Yudenich. In 1919–1920, together with Aleksandr Kuprin he was the editor of the newspaper Svoboda Rossii ("Freedom of Russia" or "Russia's Freedom"), and in 1920–1921 the newspaper Za svobodu Rossii ("For Russia's Freedom"). In 1919–1920 he simultaneously occupied a key role in the press and propaganda department of Yudenich's army. Of this period, as well as from his own role in the administration of general Yudenich, he wrote a memoir, U vorot Petrograda ("At the gates of Petrograd").

In 1921 he emigrated once again, and joined the ranks of the social and political movement known as smenovekhovstvo. From 26 March 1922 to 1 October 1923 he edited Nakanune ("On the eve"), the main printed organ of the group in Berlin, which advocated for reconciliation with the Bolsheviks and was subsidised by the USSR. He went on to head the press department of the USSR embassy in Germany (from 1 October 1923), and was in March 1924 posted as press-attaché of the Soviet embassy in Italy. He left this position in October 1925 and relocated to the USSR, where he was employed by the People's Commissariat for Foreign Affairs, writing articles for the periodical Mezhdunarodnaya Zhizn ("International Life"), especially about Italy. In 1933 he edited a bulletin for the People's Commissariat for Agriculture, and the following year he joined the editorial staff of the Great Soviet Encyclopedia.

On 28 August 1936 he was arrested by the NKVD in the city of Kislovodsk, then in the North Caucasus Krai, after an accusation of "active participation in a counter-revolutionary group and anti-Soviet agitation" was levied against him in a special meeting of the NKVD dated 28 March 1936. He was sentenced to internal exile in the city of Turukhansk, Krasnoyarsk Krai, in Siberia. However, on 7 February 1938 Kirdetsov was again arrested by the NKVD of Krasnoyarsk Krai and sentenced to serve 8 years in Norillag for "taking part in the anti-Soviet right-Trotskyite organization". His exact death date is unknown, but the last documents regarding his imprisonment are from 1940. Kirdetsov was rehabilitated on 25 November 1957.
