= Filtration camp =

Filtration camp may refer to:

- NKVD filtration camps, camps for the screening of Soviet soldiers in enemy land or under enemy control set by the NKVD
- Filtration camp system in Chechnya, mass internment centers of Chechens applied in Russia during the Chechen Wars
- Russian filtration camps of Ukrainians, used by Russia during the 2022 Russian invasion of Ukraine before forcibly displacing Ukrainian citizens to Russia

== See also ==
- Concentration camp
- Special camp (disambiguation)
