= Concentration camp =

Form of internment camp for political prisoners

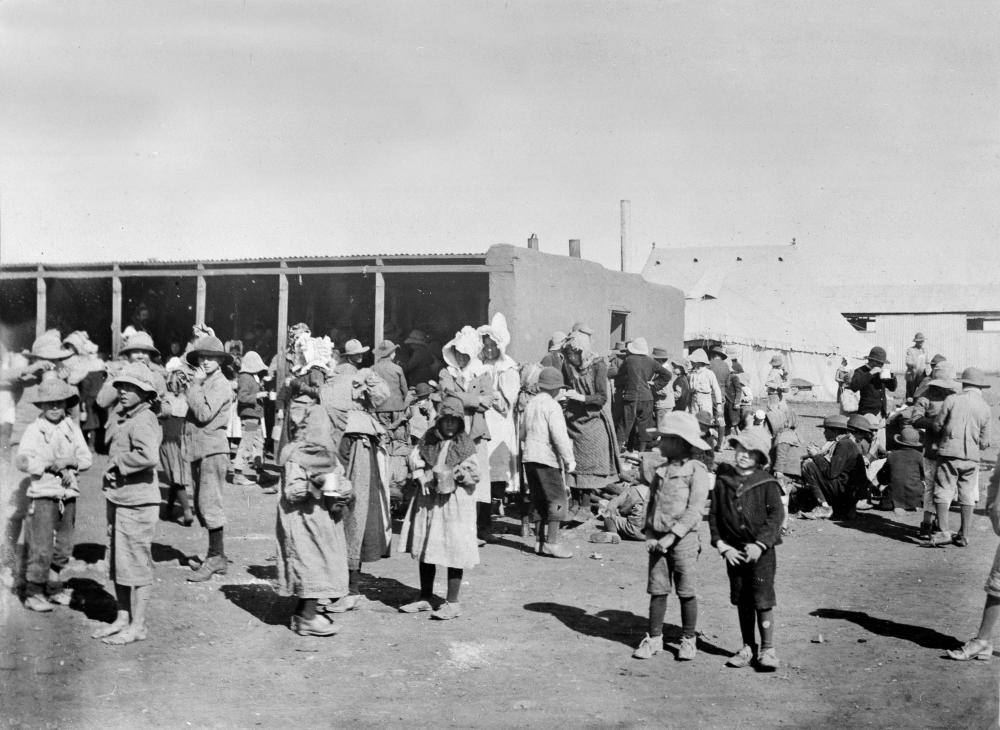
Boer women and children in a Second Boer War concentration camp in South Africa (1899–1902)

A concentration camp is a prison or other facility used for the internment of political prisoners or politically targeted demographics, such as members of national or ethnic minority groups, on the grounds of national security, exploitation, or punishment.

Prominent examples of historic concentration camps include the Nazi concentration camps (which later morphed into extermination camps), the British confinement of non-combatants during the Second Boer War, the internment of German, Italian, and Japanese Americans by the US during the Second World War, and the Soviet labour camps or gulag.

== History ==
=== Definition ===
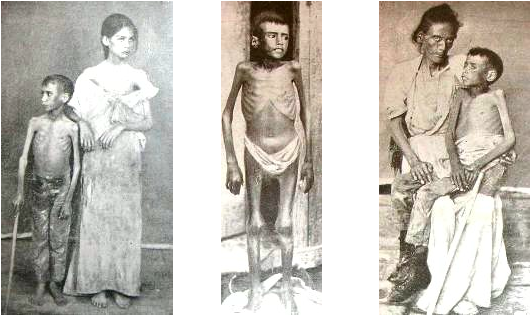
Cuban victims of Spanish reconcentration policies, 1896

The term concentration camp originates from the Spanish–Cuban Ten Years' War when Spanish forces detained Cuban civilians in camps to more easily combat guerrilla forces. Spain used concentration camps again in Cuba with Valeriano Weyler's Reconcentration policy during the 1895-98 Cuban War of Independence where rural Cubans were relocated to concentration camps. Over the following decades, the Americans during the Philippine–American War, the British during the Second Boer War, and the Germans during the Herero and Nama genocide also used concentration camps.

The term "concentration camp" and "internment camp" are used to refer to a variety of systems that greatly differ in their severity, mortality rate, and architecture; their defining characteristic is that inmates are held outside the rule of law. Extermination camps or death camps, whose primary purpose is killing, are also imprecisely referred to as "concentration camps".

The American Heritage Dictionary defines the term concentration camp as: "A camp where persons are confined, usually without hearings and typically under harsh conditions, often as a result of their membership in a group which the government has identified as dangerous or undesirable."

Although the first example of civilian internment may date as far back as the 1830s, the English term concentration camp was first used to refer to the reconcentration camps (Spanish: reconcentrados) which were set up by the Spanish military in Cuba during the Ten Years' War (1868–1878). The label was applied yet again to camps set up by the United States during the Philippine–American War (1899–1902). And expanded usage of the concentration camp label continued when the British set up camps during the Second Boer War (1899–1902) in South Africa for interning Boers during the same time period. The German Empire also established concentration camps during the Herero and Nama genocide (1904–1907); the death rate of these camps was 45 per cent, twice that of the British camps.

=== Russian camps ===
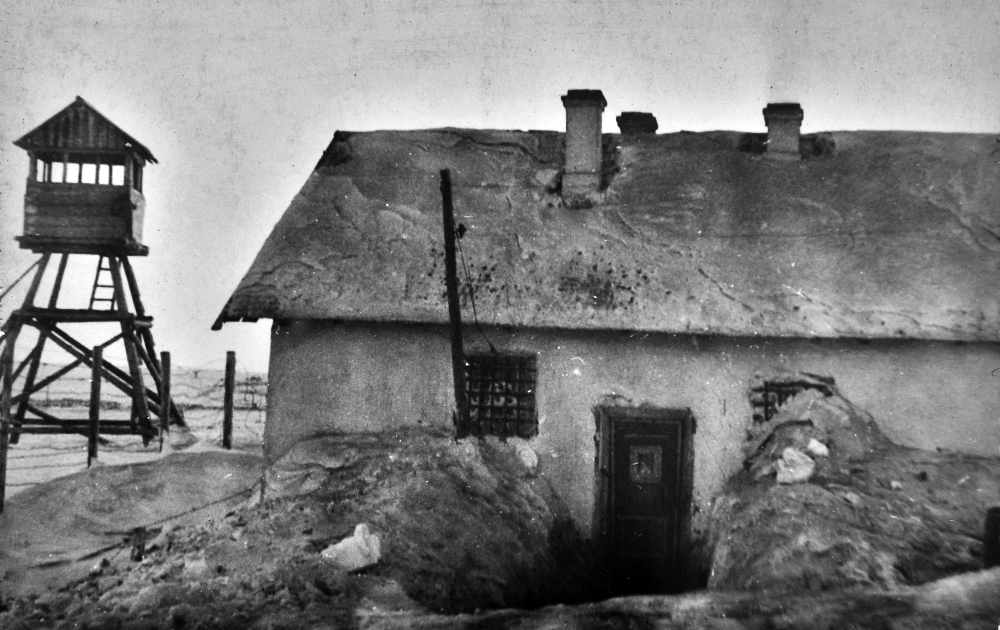
Punishment cell block in one of the subcamps of Vorkutlag, a major Russian gulag, 1945

The Russian Empire used forced exile and forced labour as forms of judicial punishment. Katorga, a category of punishment which was reserved for those who were convicted of the most serious crimes, had many of the features that were associated with labor-camp imprisonment. According to historian Anne Applebaum, katorga was not a common sentence; approximately 6,000 katorga convicts were serving sentences in 1906 and 28,600 in 1916. These camps served as a model for political imprisonment during the Soviet period. In the midst of the Russian Civil War, Lenin and the Bolsheviks established "special" prison camps, separate from its traditional prison system and under the control of the Cheka. These camps, as Lenin envisioned them, had a distinctly political purpose. These concentration camps were not identical to the Stalinist, but were introduced to isolate war prisoners given the extreme historical situation following World War 1. In 1929, the distinction between criminal and political prisoners was eliminated, administration of the camps was turned over to the Joint State Political Directorate, and the camps were greatly expanded to the point that they comprised a significant portion of the Soviet economy. This Gulag system consisted of several hundred camps for most of its existence and detained some 18 million people from 1929 until 1953. As part of a series of reforms during the Khrushchev Thaw, the Gulag shrank to a quarter of its former size and receded in its significance in Soviet society.

=== Young Turk camps ===
The camps formed part of the Armenian genocide, during which the Young Turk government deported Armenians into Syria and Mesopotamia and later ordered mass killings of survivors. From mid-1915, deported Armenians arriving in Aleppo were redirected into concentration camps across Syria and Upper Mesopotamia, including Sibil, Meskene, Ras al-Ayn, and Deir ez-Zor. By October 1915, about 870,000 deportees had reached the region, many repeatedly transferred between camps under conditions that promoted exhaustion, hunger, and disease. Food and water were frequently withheld, while dysentery, typhus, pneumonia, exposure, and malnutrition caused mortality; some camps were closed when epidemics threatened Ottoman troops. Aid organizations were barred from feeding deportees, although local officials and relief networks sometimes provided assistance.

Ras al-Ayn became a major collecting point for deportees, especially women and children. In late 1915 and early 1916, camps around Aleppo were liquidated and survivors sent toward Ras al-Ayn and later Deir ez-Zor. Deportees were also subjected to robbery, rape, abduction, forced marriage, and the sale or transfer of children.

Despite these conditions, Armenian-led relief and resistance networks based in Aleppo helped some deportees survive. At the beginning of 1916, roughly 500,000 deportees remained alive in Syria and Mesopotamia, but Ottoman authorities initiated a wave of killings, partly from fear that survivors might return home after the war. Deir ez-Zor became the principal terminal zone of the deportation system, where survivors faced starvation, exposure, and mass killing. Remote desert locations along the Euphrates and Khabur facilitated concealment and disposal of victims’ bodies. It is estimated that up to 700,000 Armenians were killed in the concentration camps between 1915 and 1918, particularly around Deir ez-Zor and the Khabur valley.

=== Nazi camps ===
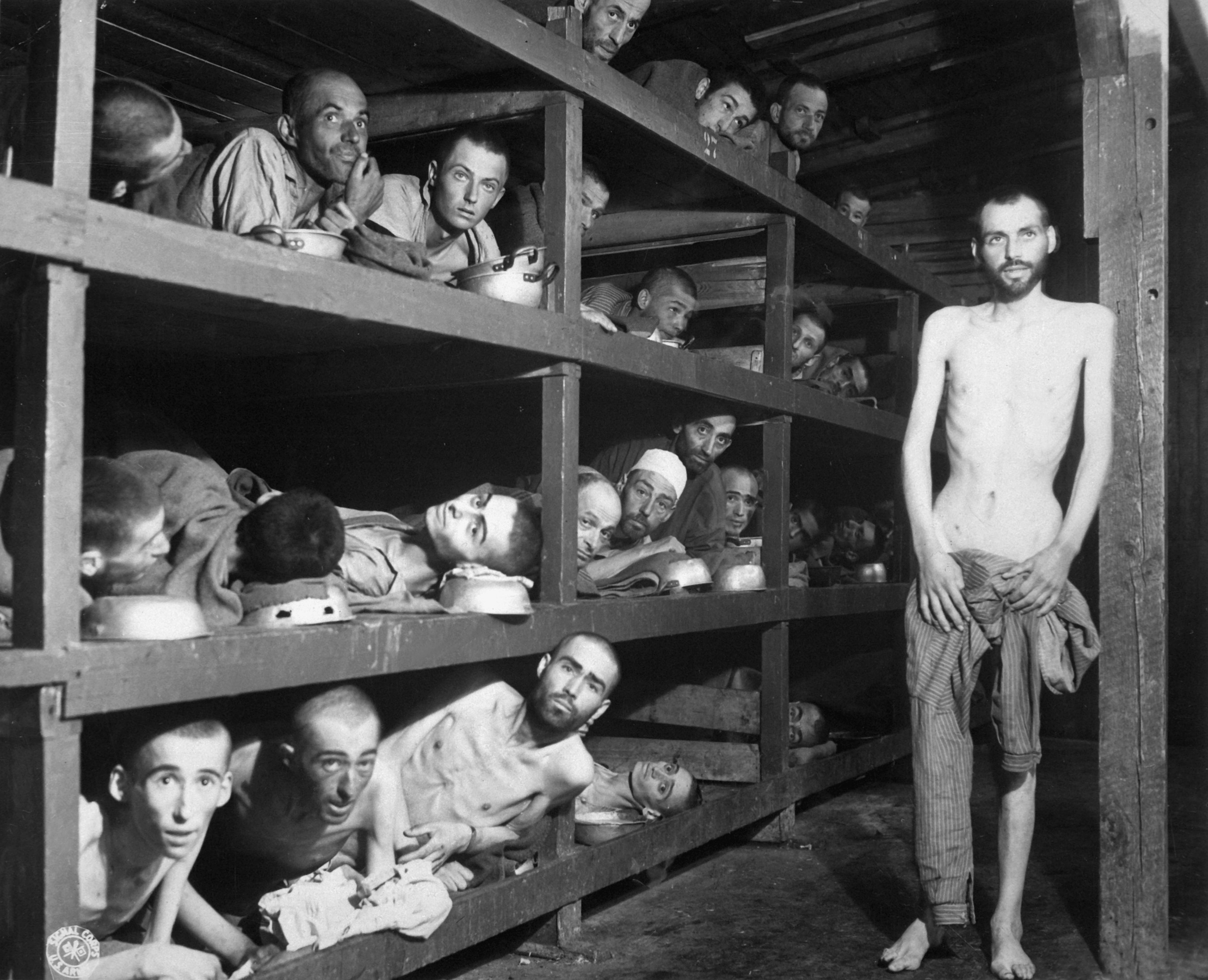
Jewish slave laborers at the Buchenwald concentration camp near Weimar photographed after their liberation by the Allies on 16 April 1945

Nazi Germany first established concentration camps for tens of thousands of political prisoners, primarily members of the Communist Party of Germany and the Social Democratic Party of Germany, in 1933, detaining tens of thousands of prisoners. Many camps were closed following the releases of prisoners at the end of the year, and the camp population would continue to dwindle through 1936; this trend would reverse in 1937, with the Nazi regime arresting tens of thousands of "anti-socials", a category that included Romani people as well as the homeless, mentally ill, and social non-conformists. Jews were increasingly targeted beginning in 1938. Following the Nazi invasion of Poland and the beginning of World War II, the camps were massively expanded and became increasingly deadly. At its peak, the Nazi concentration camp system was extensive, with as many as 15,000 camps and at least 715,000 simultaneous internees. About 1.65 million people were registered prisoners in the camps, of whom about a million died during their imprisonment. The total number of casualties in these camps is difficult to determine, but the deliberate policy of extermination through labor in many of the camps was designed to ensure that the inmates would die of starvation, untreated disease and summary executions within set periods of time. In addition to the concentration camps, Nazi Germany established six extermination camps, specifically designed to kill millions of people, primarily by gassing. As a result, the term "concentration camp" is sometimes conflated with the concept of an "extermination camp" and historians debate whether the term "concentration camp" or the term "internment camp" should be used to describe other examples of civilian internment.

=== Other camps ===
Both before and during World War II, concentration camps were established by various governments. In the late 1920s, the Dutch colonial government established the Boven-Digoel concentration camp in the Dutch East Indies (present-day Indonesia) to intern Indonesian nationalist leaders and political dissidents. They were used by Francisco Franco during and after the Spanish Civil War. During World War II, concentration camps were also established by the Italian, Brazilian, Japanese, United States, and Canadian governments.

=== Modern usage ===
The use of the former label continues to be expanded in relation to post-World War II camps, for instance, it is used in relation to British camps in Kenya which were used by the British government during the Mau Mau rebellion (1952–1960), French camps to forcibly relocate 2 million Algerians during the Algerian War, camps which were set up in Chile during the military dictatorship of Augusto Pinochet (1973–1990).

According to the United States Department of Defense as many as 3 million Uyghurs and members of other Muslim minority groups are being held in China's re-education camps which are located in the Xinjiang region and which American news reports often label as concentration camps. The camps were established in the late 2010s under Chinese Communist Party general secretary Xi Jinping's administration.

More recently, there have been instances of plots of land used as recruitment centers, for forced labor and extermination centers used by Mexican drug cartels, a prominent example being the Jalisco extermination camp, where a group of people who were looking for missing persons in Mexico found over 200 pairs of shoes and clandestine crematoriums. The internment of US immigrants under the second Trump Administration, such as the South Florida Detention Facility and CECOT, has drawn comparison to the use of concentration camps. While some outlets rejected this comparison, hundreds of Holocaust and genocide scholars wrote an open letter addressed to the United States Holocaust Memorial Museum calling the use of the term "concentration camp" appropriate.

== Gallery ==
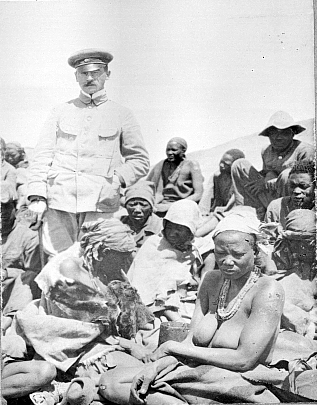
Lieutenant von Durling with prisoners at Shark Island, one of the German concentration camps used during the Herero and Nama genocide

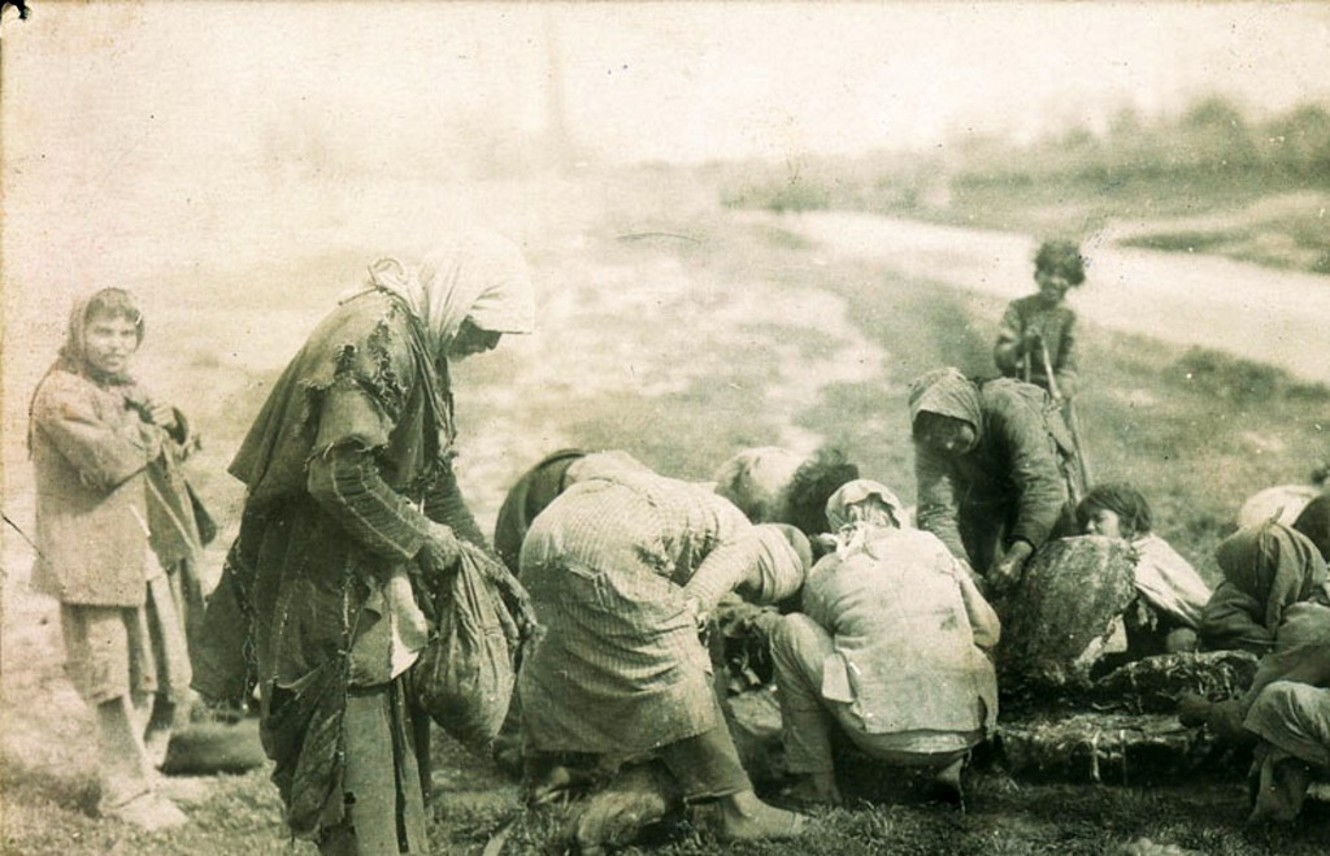
Armenian refugees collected near the body of a dead horse at Deir ez-Zor, during the Armenian genocide

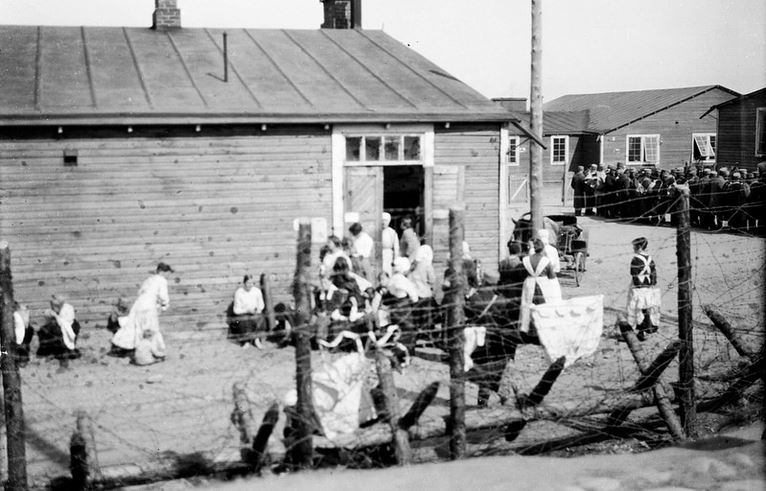
Women at the Kalevankangas concentration camp of Tampere in 1918, several months after the outbreak of the Finnish Civil War

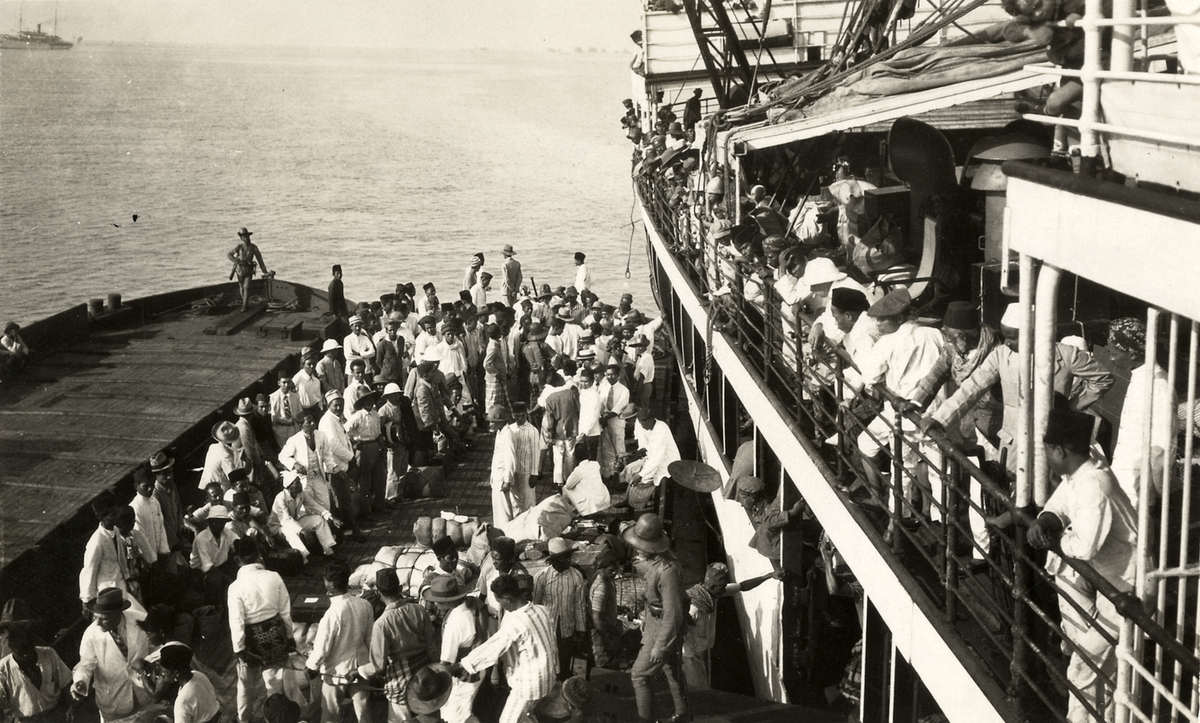
Indonesian prisoners being exiled to the Dutch camp of Boven-Digoel, 1927

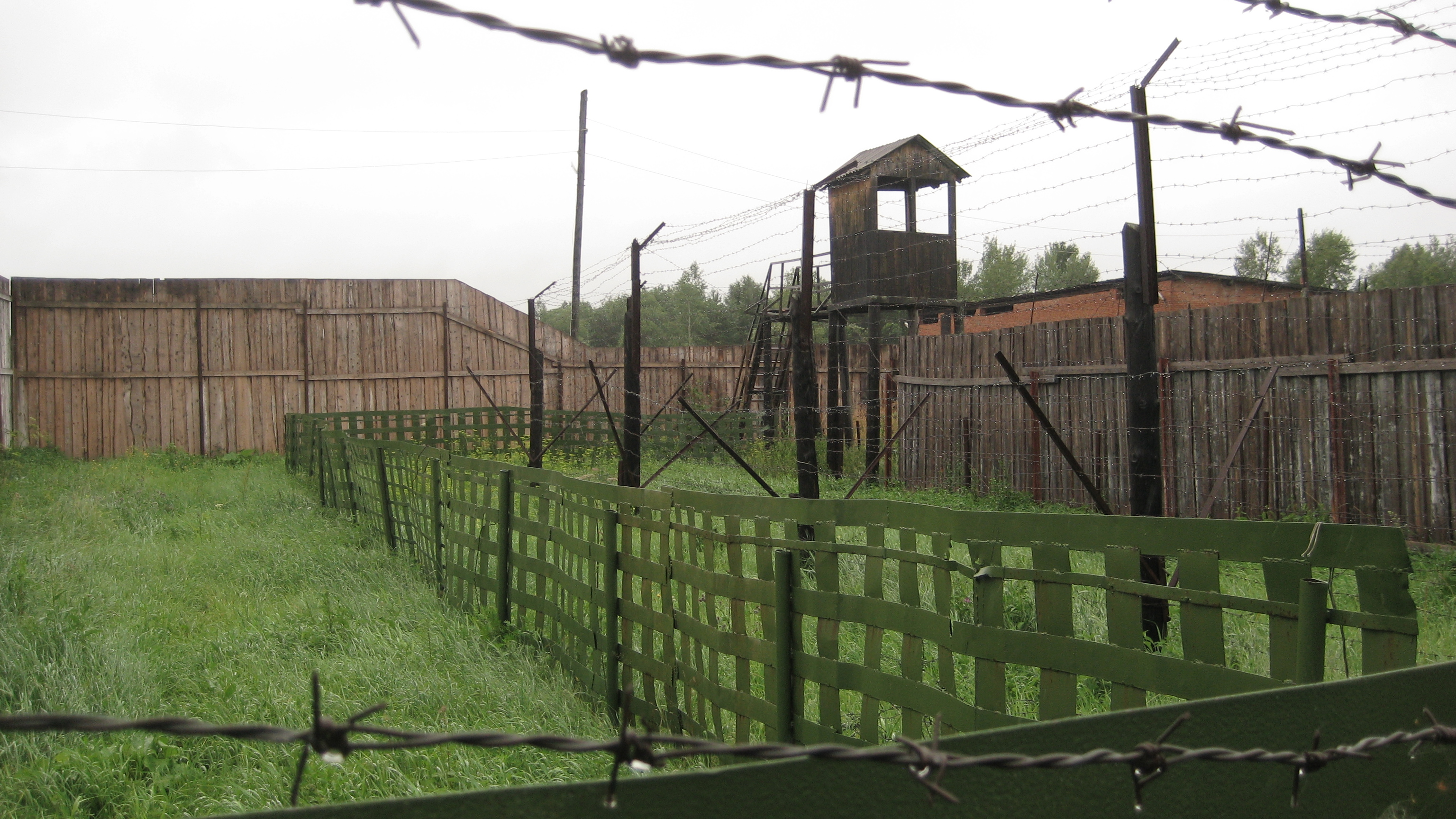
Fence at the gulag Perm-36, opened in 1943

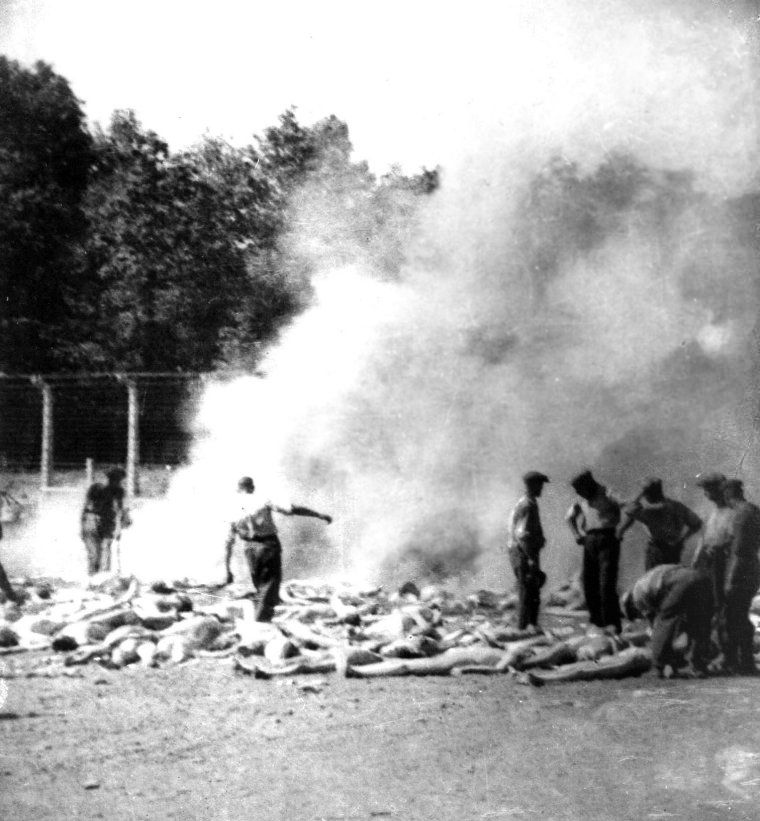
Prisoners' bodies are burned after they are killed in the gas chambers at Auschwitz concentration camp

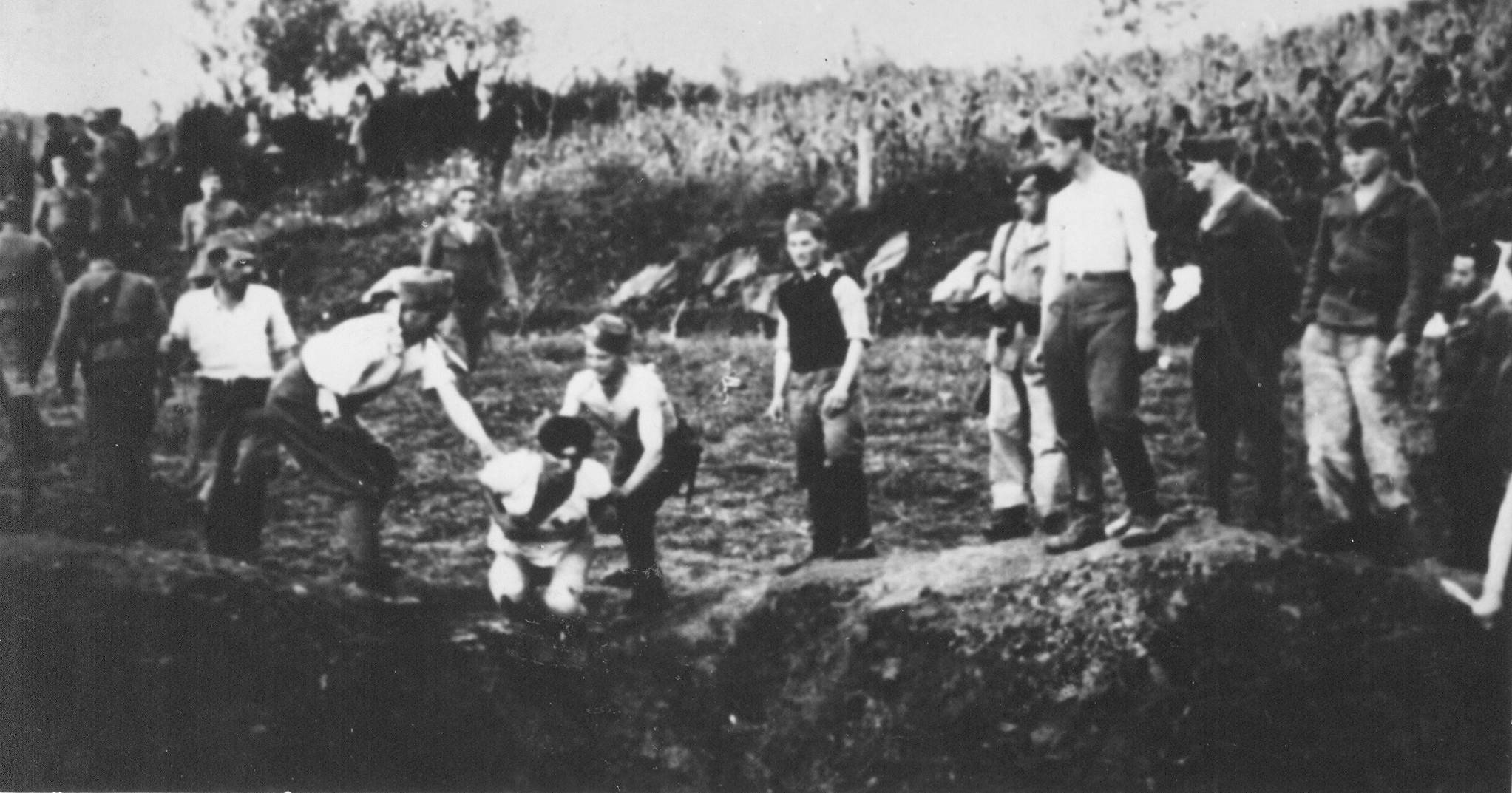
Ustaše soldiers kill prisoners near Jasenovac concentration camp

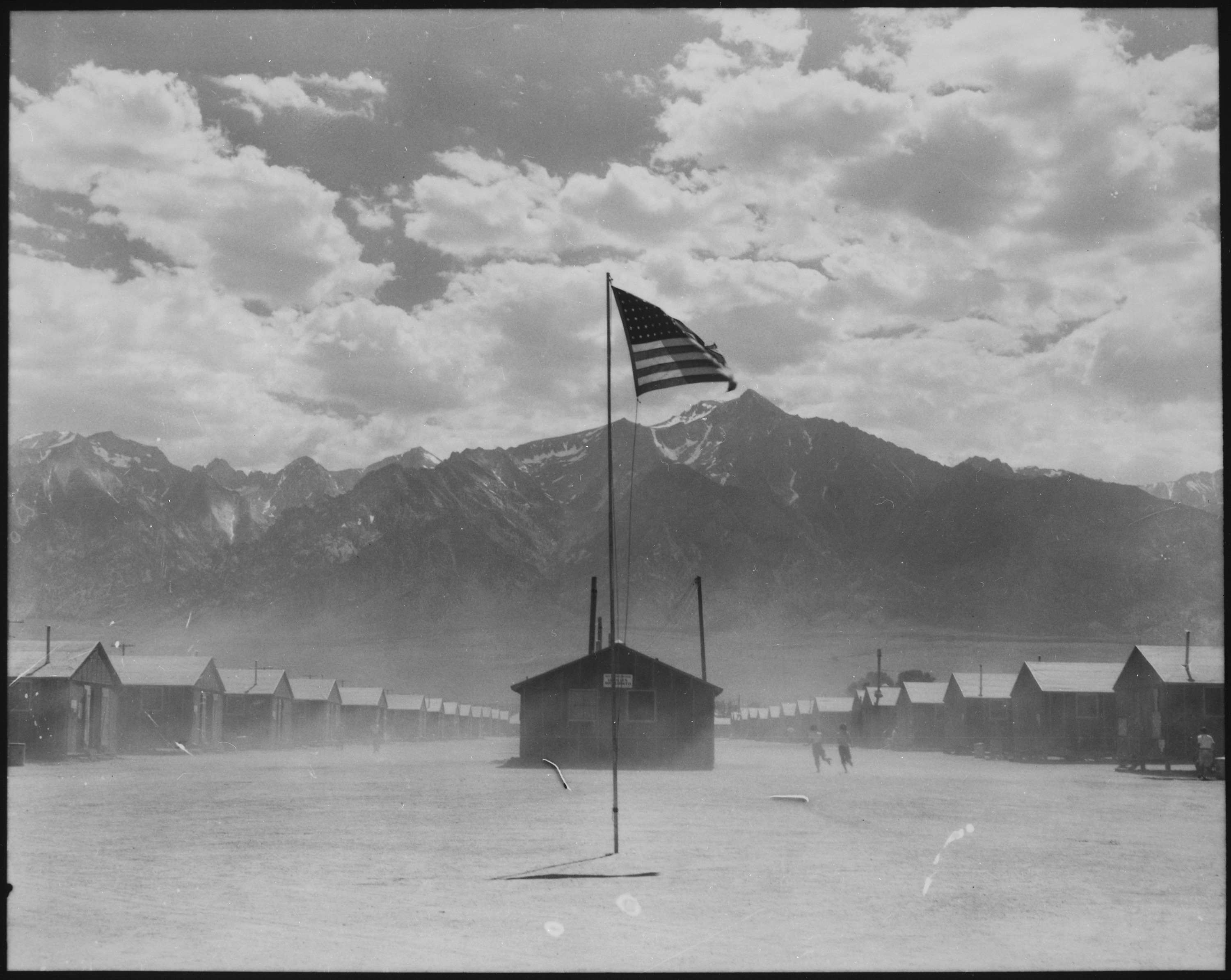
Manzanar internment camp for Japanese-Americans in 1942

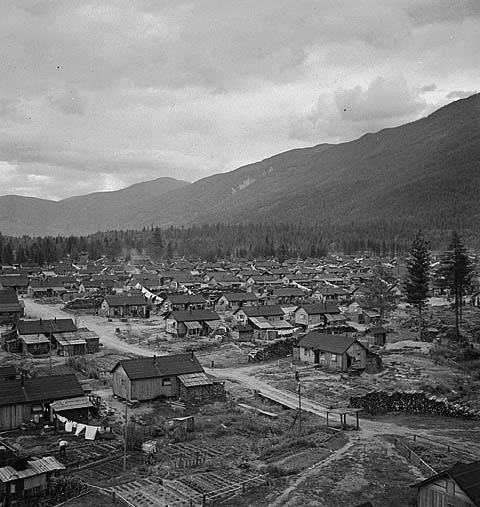
An internment camp for Japanese-Canadians in British Columbia

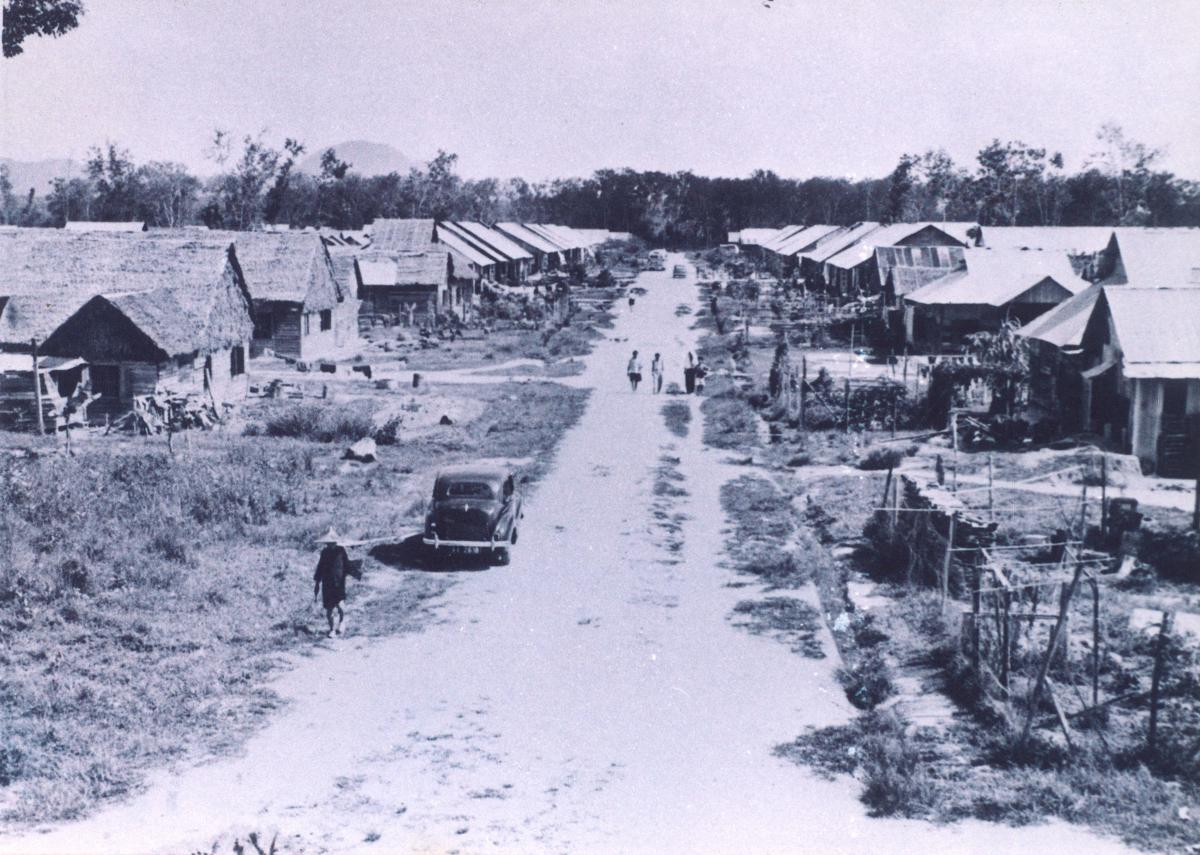
A model new village, designed as part of the Briggs Plan to separate the largely Chinese Malaysian rural populace from communist guerrillas during the Malayan Emergency (1948–1960)

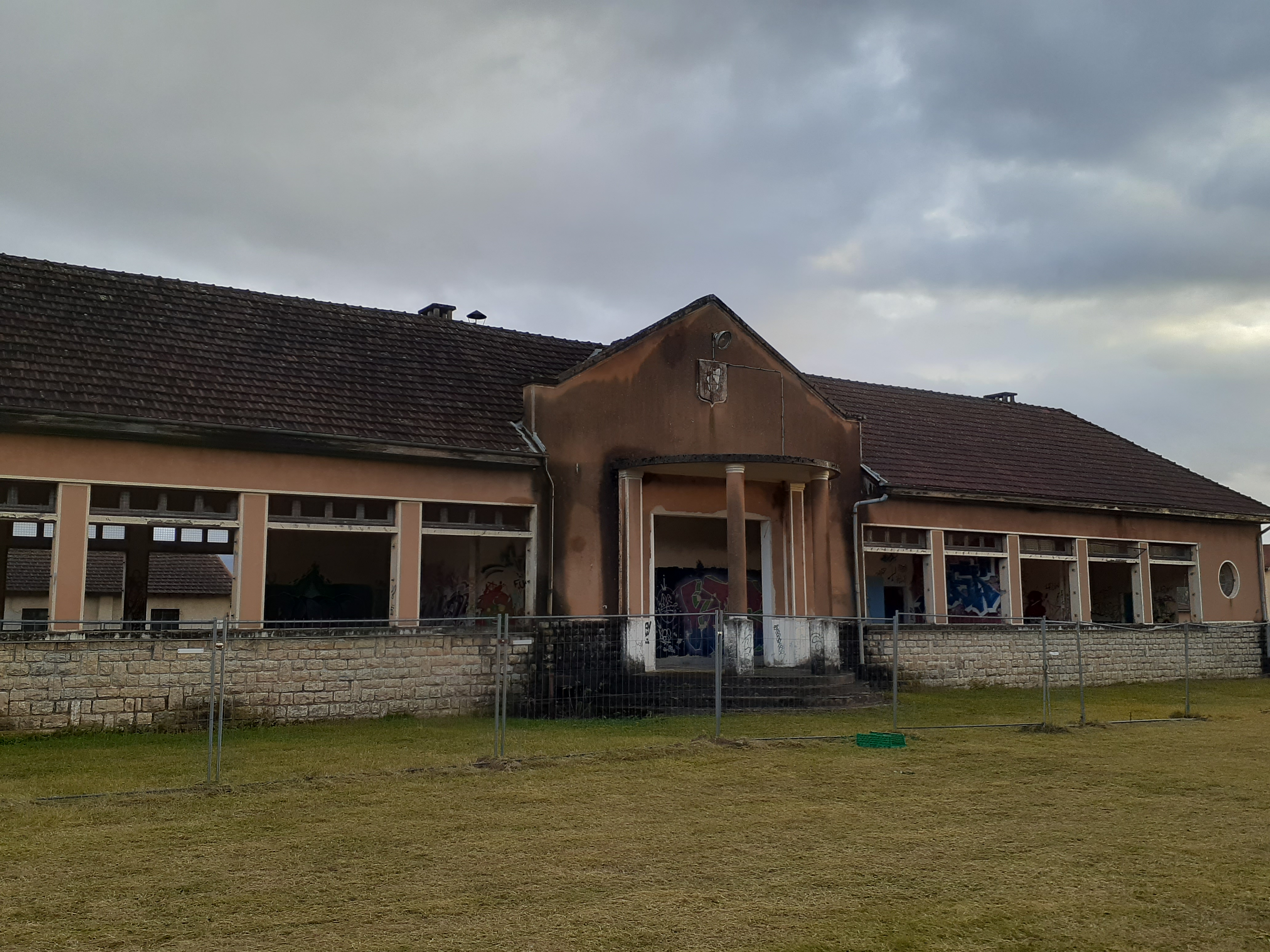
Camp de Thol, one of the French concentration camps for Algerians which was used by the French government during the Algerian War

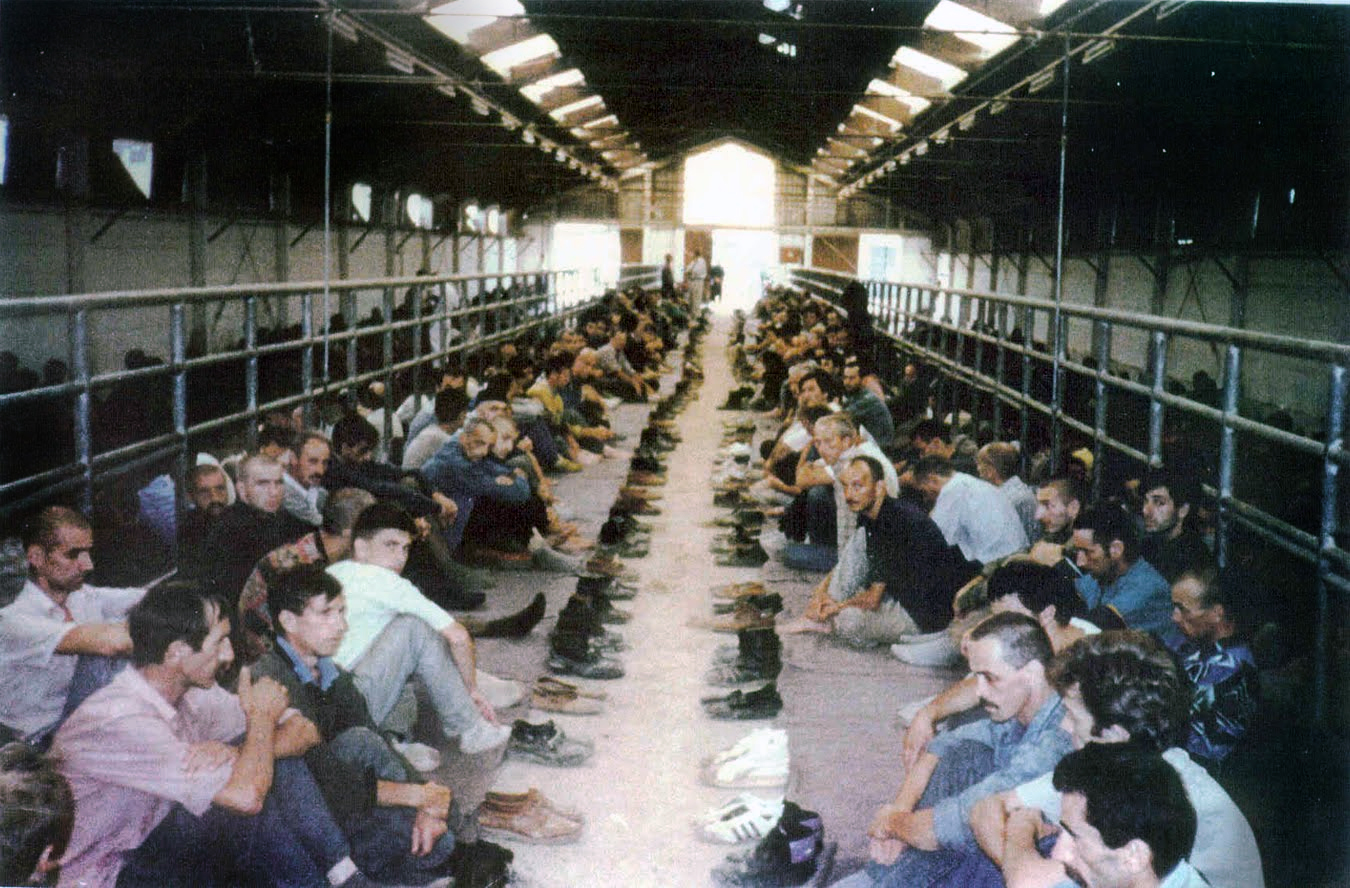
Bosniak civilian detainees of Bosanska Krajina in Manjača camp

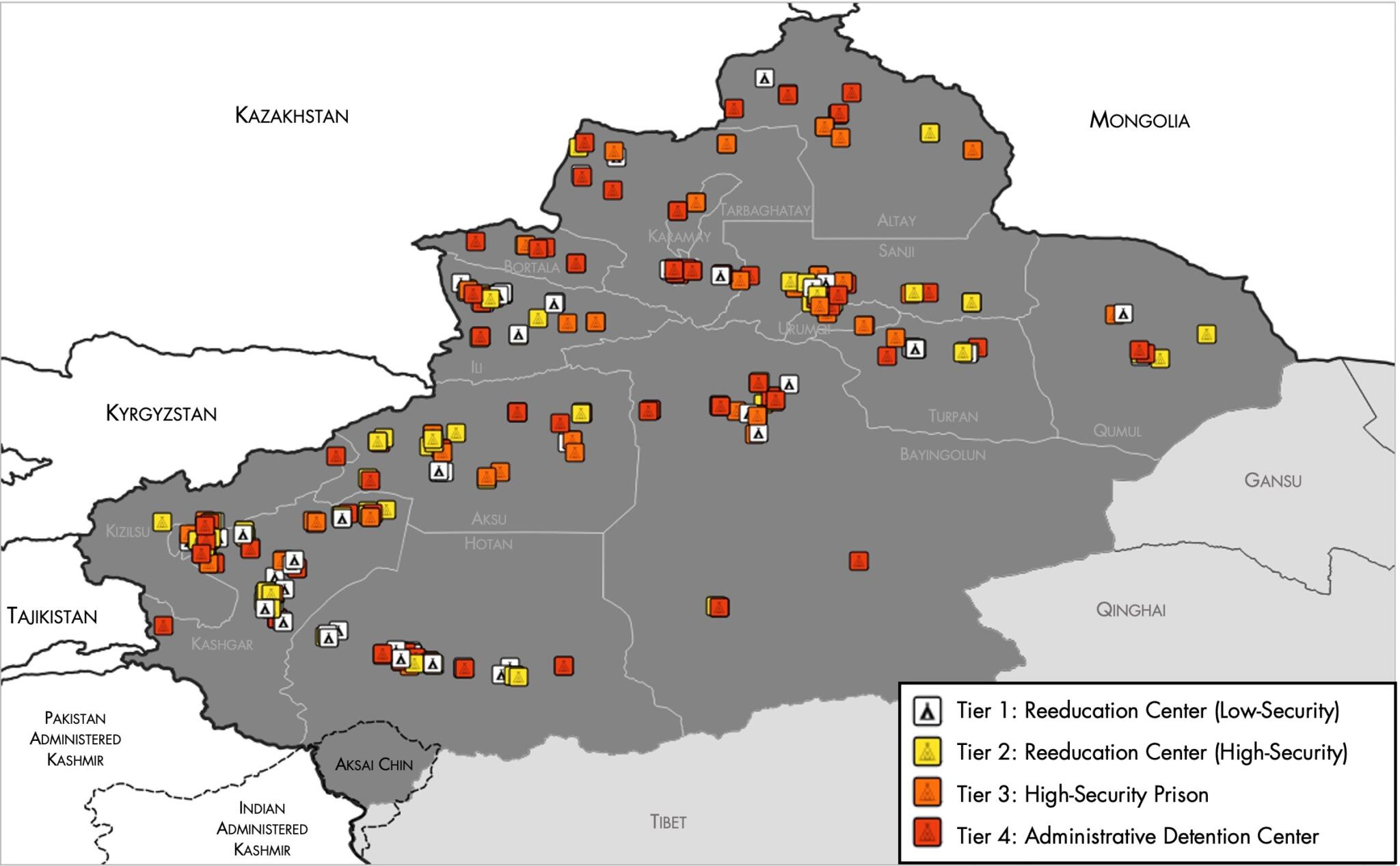
Map of the Xinjiang re-education camps in China based on data collected by the US National Geospatial Intelligence Agency and the Australian Strategic Policy Institute

== See also ==
- List of concentration and internment camps
- Civilian internee
- Extermination through labor
- Filtration camp
- New village
- Labor camp
- Kwalliso (North Korean political penal labour colonies)
- Laogai (Chinese, "reform through labor")
- Military Units to Aid Production, Cuba
- Prisoner-of-war camp
- Prisons in North Korea
- Re-education camp (Vietnam)
- Re-education through labor
- Special camp
