= Special camp =

Special camp may refer to:

- NKVD special camps in Germany 1945–1950
- NKVD filtration camps, originally known as NKVD special camps
- MVD special camp, since 1948
- Occasional classification of some gulag camp complexes : Special-Purpose OGPU Camps (лагеря ОГПУ особого назначения): e.g. Соловецкие лагеря особого назначения (Solovki prison camp), etc.

== See also ==
- Concentration camp
- Filtration camp (disambiguation)
