= Steplag =

Soviet labor camp

Steplag or Stepnoy Camp Directorate, Special Camp No. 4 (Степлаг (Степной лагерь), Особлаг (Особый лагерь) № 4) was an MVD special camp for political prisoners within the Gulag system of the Soviet Union. It was established on February 28, 1948, on the base of the Spasozavodsky (Спасозаводский) POW camp near Karaganda, Kazakhstan. Its headquarters were in Kengir or Jezkazgan. In 1956, Steplag was disestablished, and its camps were transferred to the Ministry of Internal Affairs of the Kazakh SSR.

== History ==
Main works were construction works, copper and coal mining, but various odd jobs as well.

Initially it was planned for 10,000 inmates, but it was expanded with more subcamps and at its height it held about 28,000 in 1950.

Between May and June 1954, the Kengir uprising occurred in Steplag.

== Detainees by nationality ==
Detainee statistics by nationality:

No.	Nationality	Number	%	No.	Nationality	Number	%
1	Ukrainians	9 596	46.36 %	18	Turkmens	76	0.38 %
2	Lithuanians	2 690	13.0 %	19	Ingush people	56	0.27 %
3	Russians	2 661	12.86 %	20	Chinese	55	0.27 %
4	Latvians	1 074	5.19 %	21	Tajiks	54	0.26 %
5	Belarusians	878	4.24 %	22	Koreans	52	0.25 %
6	Estonians	873	4.22 %	23	Kyrgyz people	50	0.24 %
7	Polish people	379	1.83 %	24	Japanese people	30	0.14 %
8	Germans	359	1.73 %	25	Romanians	24	0.12 %
9	Kazakhs	291	1.40 %	26	Greeks	21	0.10 %
10	Moldovans	208	1.0 %	27	Udmurts	20	0.10 %
11	Uzbeks	204	0.99 %	28	Iranian peoples	18	0.09 %
12	Jews	174	0.84 %	29	Finns and Karelians	16	0.08 %
13	Armenians	154	0.74 %	30	Bashkirs	9	0.04 %
14	Georgians	132	0.64 %	31	Pashtuns	8	0.04 %
15	Tatars	127	0.61 %	32	Turkish people	8	0.04 %
16	Chechens	124	0.60 %	33	Mongols	2	0.01 %
17	Azerbaijanis	108	0.52 %	34	Other	167	0.81 %

== Notable inmates ==
- Alexander Dolgun, US embassy clerk falsely accused of espionage; author of the memoir Alexander Dolgun’s Story: An American in the Gulag.
- Vladimir Efroimson, Soviet geneticist
- Metropolitan Ioann, Ukrainian Orthodox minister
- Tatiana Okunevskaya, Russian actress
- Maria Kapnist, Ukrainian actress
