= Berlag =

Gulag labor camp

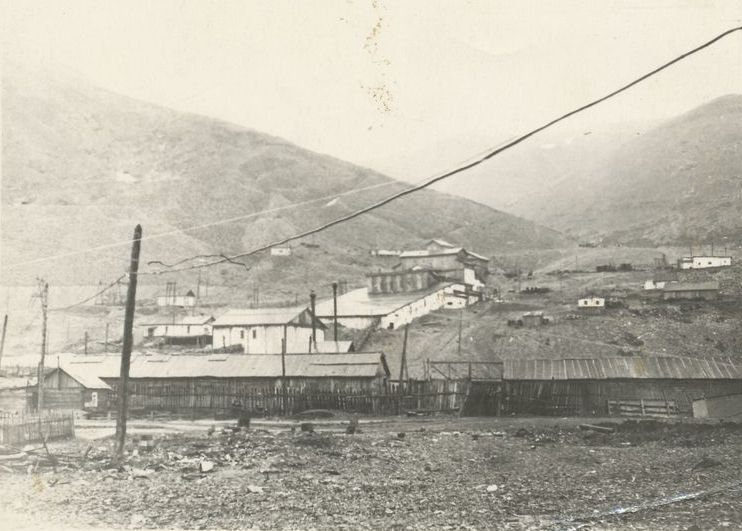
Cassiterite mine "Khenikandzha" (Хениканджа)

Berlag or Beregovoy Camp Directorate, Special Camp No. 5, Osoblag of Dalstroy (Особый лагерь № 5 — «Береговой», Берлаг, Особлаг Дальстроя) was an MVD special camp for political prisoners within the Gulag system of the Soviet Union. It was established on February 28, 1948 and operated within the Dalstroy organization. In 1954, after Stalin's death the camps of Berlag were converted into regular corrective labor camps.
