= Norillag =

Gulag labor camp in Krasnoyarsk Krai, Russia

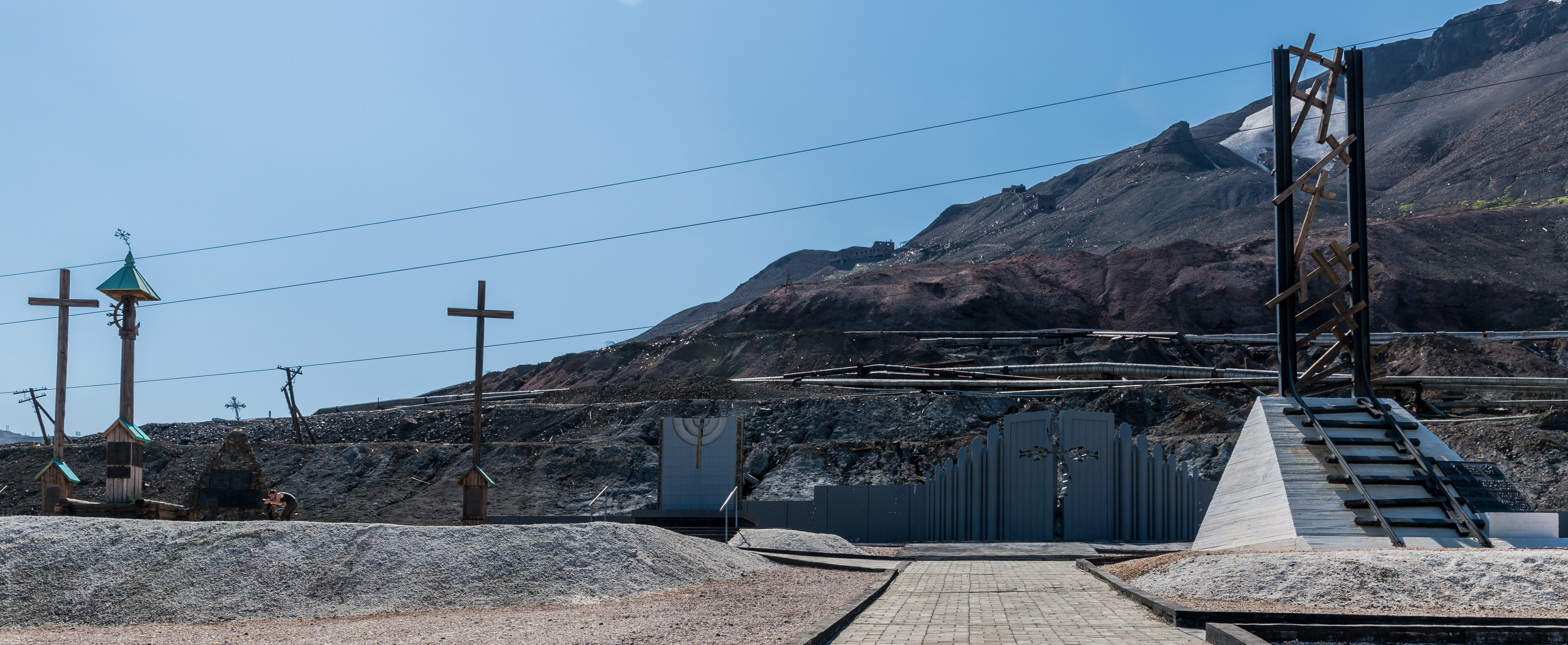
Monument to victims of Gulag in Norilsk

Norillag, Norilsk Corrective Labor Camp (Russian: Норильлаг, Норильский ИТЛ) was a gulag labor camp set by Norilsk, Krasnoyarsk Krai, Russia and headquartered there. It existed from June 25, 1935, to August 22, 1956.

== History ==
Two days after the adoption of a decree issued by the Council of People's Commissars regarding Norilsk, NKVD chief Genrikh Yagoda signed a secret order No. 00239 of June 25, 1935 "On the organization of Norilsk Nickel Complex construction". Initially, the Norillag labor force was responsible for the construction of the Norilsk mining-metallurgic complex and for mining copper and nickel. Its activities gradually expanded into virtually all economical functions of the region, from fishing to "reconstruction of the house where lived Comrade I.V. Stalin in exile".

Starting from 1,200 inmates in 1935, its numbers jumped to 9,000 in 1937 (the onset of the Great Purge) and peaked in 1951 at 72,500, housed in 30 camp sections. Memorial estimates the total number of its inmates over the history of the camp at 400,000, with about 300,000 being political prisoners. The geography of this camp system included the Norilsk area, including Dudinka and Kayerkan, as well as more remote places, including Krasnoyarsk and some agricultural camps in Kureika (village), Atamanovo and Shushenskoye.

Initially the construction activities were handled by the Norilstroy (Норильстрой), while Norillag supplied the workforce and some infrastructure.

In 1953, shortly after the death of Joseph Stalin, the Gorlag camp of Norillag system was the place of the major Gulag revolt, known as the Norilsk uprising.

It was closed in 1957, together with most of the Gulag system.

== Notable inmates ==
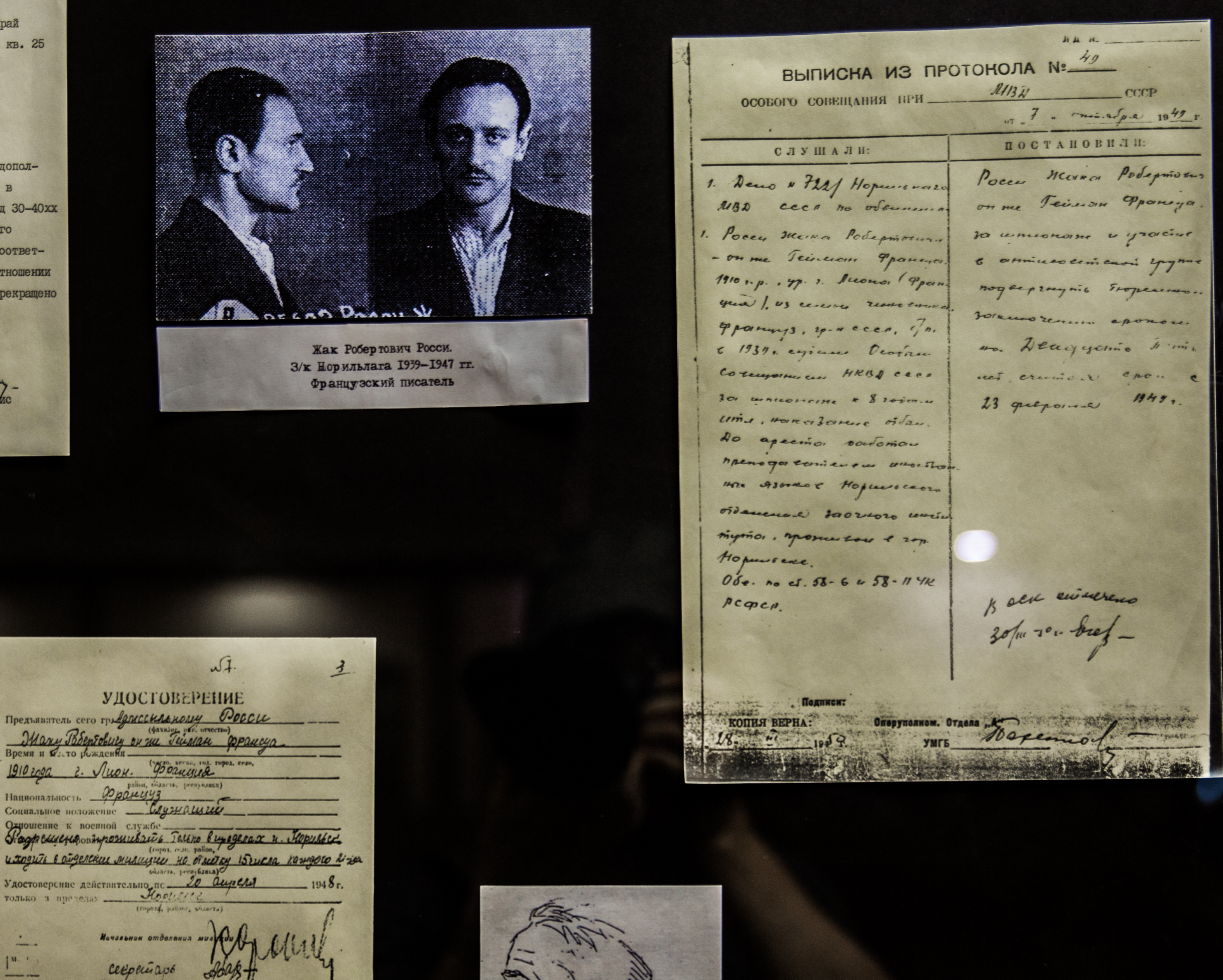
Jacques Rossi

- Aleksei Balandin
- Dmitri Bystrolyotov
- Herbert Brede (1888–1942), Estonian military commander
- Walter Ciszek (1904–1984), Polish-American Jesuit priest
- Lev Gumilev
- Eufrosinia Kersnovskaya (1908–1994), writer and artist
- Grigoriy Kirdetsov (1880–1938), journalist and translator
- Voldemar Karl Koht (1893–1942), Estonian military officer
- Nikolai Aleksandrovich Kozyrev (1908–1983), Soviet Russian astronomer and astrophysicist
- József Lengyel (1896–1975), Hungarian writer
- Jānis Medenis (1903–1961), Latvian poet and writer
- Isaiah Oggins (1898–1947), American communist and Soviet spy
- Nikolay Oyogir, Evenk writer and poet
- Jacques Rossi (1909–2004), Polish-French writer and polyglot
- Shukrullo, Uzbekistani poet (1921–2020)
- Sergey Snegov, Soviet science fiction writer
- Karlo Štajner (1902–1992), Croatian writer
- Nikolay Urvantsev (1893–1985), geologist and explorer
- Nikolai Vekšin (1887–1951), Estonian sailor
- Aleksandr Yavorsky, Russian botanist and poet
