= Sovetsky District, Stavropol Krai =

Sovetsky District Советский район (Russian)
- District
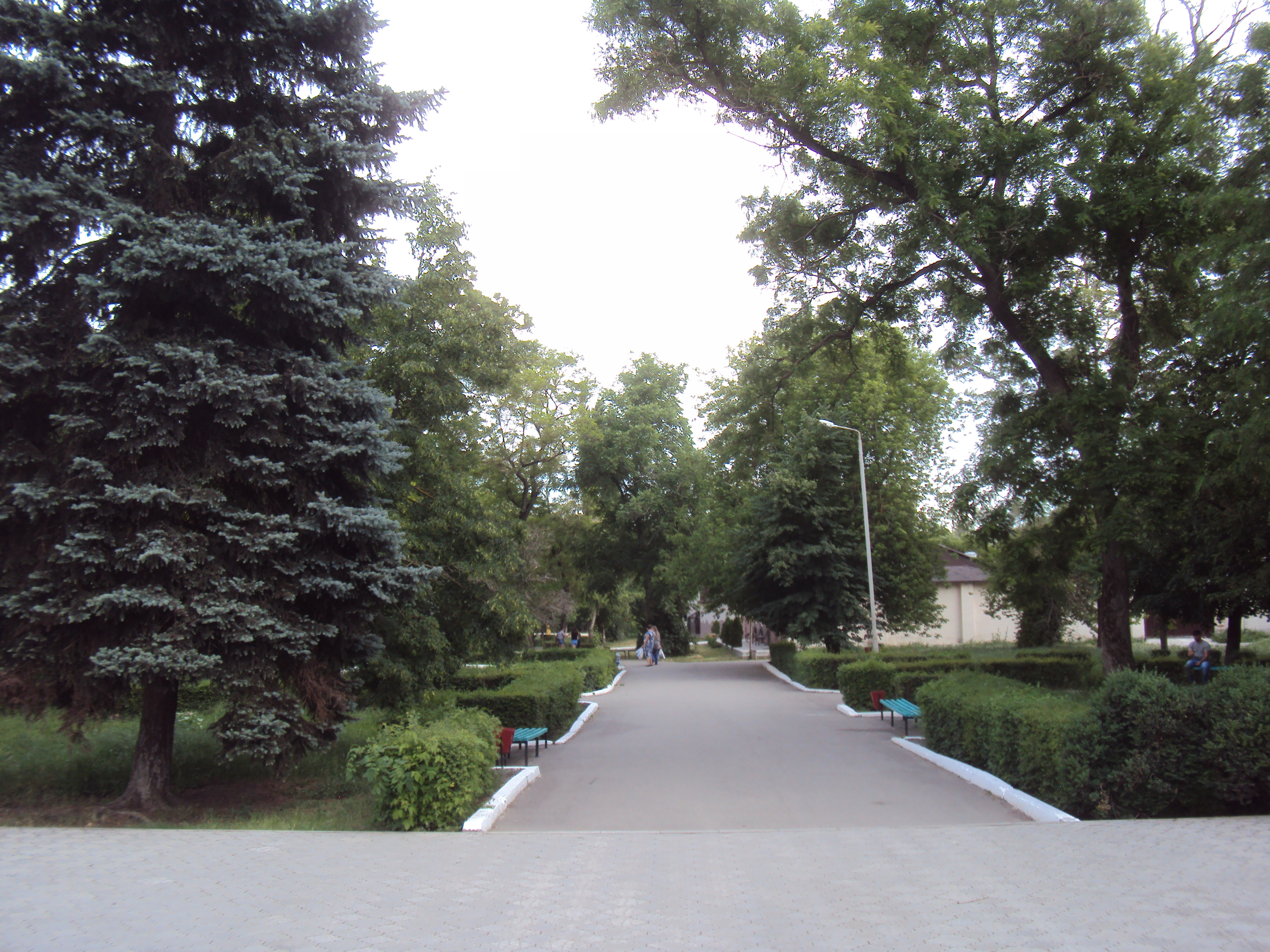
- Town park, Sovetsky District

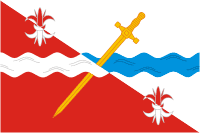
- Flag Coat of arms
- Location of Sovetsky District in Stavropol Krai
- Coordinates: 44°25′N 43°53′E
- Country: Russia
- Federal subject: Stavropol Krai
- Established: 13 April 1924
- Administrative center: Zelenokumsk

Area
  - Total: 2,089 km^{2} (807 sq mi)

Population (2010 Census)
  - Total: 62,790
  - Density: 30.06/km^{2} (77.85/sq mi)
  - Urban: 57.1%
  - Rural: 42.9%

Administrative structure
  - Administrative divisions: 1 Towns, 4 Selsoviets
  - Inhabited localities: 1 cities/towns, 25 rural localities

Municipal structure
  - Municipally incorporated as: Sovetsky Municipal District
  - Municipal divisions: 1 urban settlements, 6 rural settlements
- Time zone: UTC+3 (MSK)
- OKTMO ID: 07650000
- Website: http://www.совадмин.рф

Sovetsky District (Russian: Сове́тский райо́н) is an administrative district (raion), one of the twenty-six in Stavropol Krai, Russia. Municipally, it is incorporated as Sovetsky Municipal District. It is located in the south of the krai. The area of the district is 2,089 square kilometers (807 sq mi). Its administrative center is the town of Zelenokumsk. Population: 62,790 (2010 census); 72,762 (2002 Census); 64,993 (1989 Census). The population of Zelenokumsk accounts for 57.1% of the district's population.
