= Nikolai Vekšin =

Estonian sailor

Personal information
- Born: May 23, 1887 Haapsalu, Governorate of Estonia (then Russian Empire)
- Died: January 15, 1951 (aged 63) Norillag, Norilsk, Russian SFSR, Soviet Union
- Education: Karl May School; Imperator's Petersburg Institute of Technology
- Years active: 1911–1949?

Sport
- Country: Russia; Estonia; Soviet Union
- Club: Imperial St. Petersburg Yacht Club; Estonian Yachting Union
Medal record
Sailing
Representing Estonia
Olympic Games
Bronze medal – third place	1928 Amsterdam	6 metre class
- Updated on 8 October 2013

Nikolai Vekšin (Russian: Никола́й Алексе́евич Ве́кшин; 23 May [O.S. 11 May] 1887 in Haapsalu, Governorate of Estonia, Russian Empire – 15 January 1951 in Norillag, Norilsk, Russian SFSR, USSR) was a Russian and Estonian sailor and helmsman of the bronze-medallist Estonian team at the 1928 Amsterdam Olympic Games.

Vekšin graduated from the Karl May School and the Imperator's Petersburg Institute of Technology. He began sailing in 1911 in the Imperial St. Petersburg Yacht Club.

In the 1912 Summer Olympics he was a reserve sailor of the Russian team.

During the Russian Civil War, Vekšin served as an officer in the White Army.

In 1928 he was the helmsman of the Estonian boat Tutti V which won the bronze medal in the 6 metre class; the crew also included William von Wirén, Georg Faehlmann, Andreas Faehlmann and Eberhard Vogdt. It was the only event in the history of the Olympics when five Estonian sportspeople won medals.

After World War II and the Soviet re-occupation of Estonia Vekšin continued yacht racing. He won a silver medal of the USSR championship in 1945. He received his Soviet Master of sports title the same year.

In 1949 Vekšin was arrested by the Soviet authorities. In 1951 he died in the Norillag prison camp in Norilsk, northern Siberia.
