= Dallag =

Dallag may refer to the following Gulag camps:

- Dallag, Far East (Dalnevostochny lager) with headquarters in Khabarovsk (1929–1938)
- Dallag, Ekibastuz (Dalniy lager), an MVD special camp headquartered in Ekıbastūz (1952–1954)
