= Kengir =

Kengir Кеңгір
- village
- Location in Karagandy Province, Kazakhstan
- Coordinates: 47°50′25″N 67°36′55″E
- Country: Kazakhstan
- Region: Karaganda Region
  - Summer (DST): UTC+6 (UTC+6)

Kengir (Kazakh: Кеңгір, Keñgır) is a village in central Kazakhstan. It is situated between the cities of Zhezqazghan and Satpayev. During the Soviet era, a prison labor camp of the Steplag division of Gulag in Kazakhstan was set up adjacent to it. The camp, which was situated near the central-Kazakhstan city of Dzhezkazgan, near the Kara-Kengir River, and held approximately 5,200 prisoners, was the scene of a notable prisoner uprising in the summer of 1954. After the camp was closed, a large automotive depot was placed there.

== See also ==
- Vorkuta uprising
- List of Gulag camps
