= Zelenokumsk =

Zelenokumsk Зеленокумск
- Town
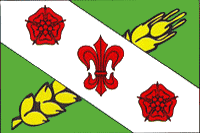
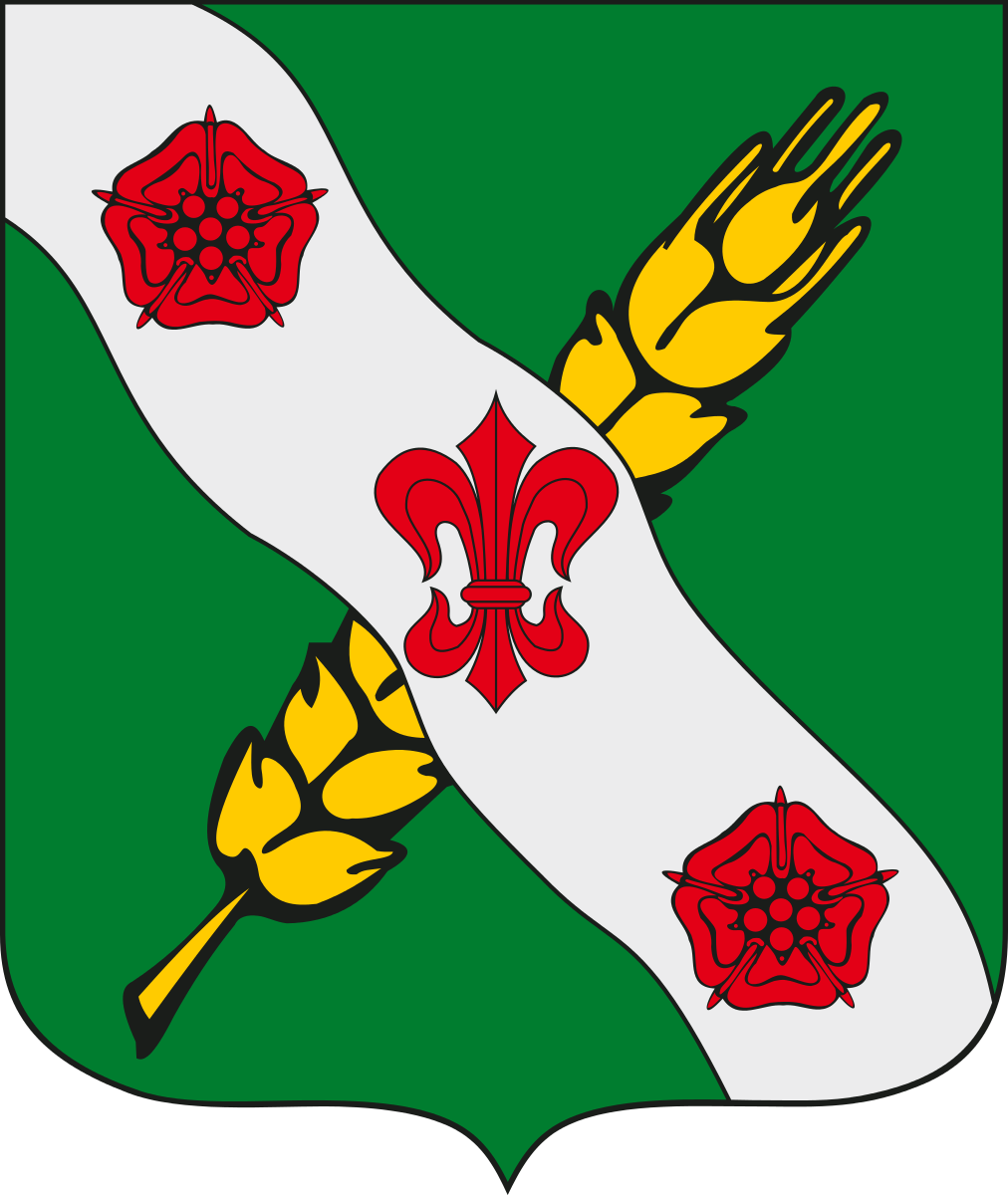
- Flag Coat of arms
- Interactive map of Zelenokumsk
- Location of Zelenokumsk Zelenokumsk (Stavropol Krai)
- Coordinates: 44°25′N 43°55′E
- Country: Russia
- Federal subject: Stavropol Krai
- Administrative district: Sovetsky District
- TownSelsoviet: Zelenokumsk
- Founded: 1762
- Town status since: 1965

Area
  - Total: 24 km^{2} (9.3 sq mi)
- Elevation: 145 m (476 ft)

Population (2010 Census)
  - Total: 35,839
  - Estimate (2025): 32,800 (−8.5%)
  - Density: 1,500/km^{2} (3,900/sq mi)

Administrative status
  - Capital of: Sovetsky District, Town of Zelenokumsk

Municipal status
  - Municipal district: Sovetsky Municipal District
  - Urban settlement: Zelenokumsk Urban Settlement
  - Capital of: Sovetsky Municipal District, Zelenokumsk Urban Settlement
- Time zone: UTC+3 (MSK)
- Postal code: 357910-357914
- Dialing code: +7 86552
- OKTMO ID: 07650101001
- Website: www.mo-zelenokumsk.ru

Zelenokumsk (Russian: Зеленоку́мск) is a town and the administrative center of Sovetsky District in Stavropol Krai, Russia, located on the Kuma River. Population: 35,839 (2010 census); 40,340 (2002 census); 35,140 (1989 Soviet census).

== History ==
It was founded in 1762 as the selo of Vorontsovo-Alexandrovskoye (Воронцово-Александровское). It was granted work settlement status in 1963 and renamed Sovetskoye. It was given its present name when town status was granted to it in 1965.

== Administrative and municipal status ==
Within the framework of administrative divisions, Zelenokumsk serves as the administrative center of Sovetsky District. As an administrative division, it is, together with six rural localities, incorporated within Sovetsky District as the Town of Zelenokumsk. As a municipal division, the Town of Zelenokumsk is incorporated within Sovetsky Municipal District as Zelenokumsk Urban Settlement.
