= Ivan Ilyich Dolgikh =

Soviet NKVD officer (1904–1961)

Ivan Ilyich Dolgikh (Russian: Иван Ильич Долгих; 1904 – 1 October 1961) was a Soviet NKVD officer, and the head of the Gulag system of labour camps from 1951 to 1954.

== Life and career ==
Born to a Russian peasant family, in Livensky Uyezd of Oryol Governorate, and educated at Moscow, Dolgikh joined the All-Union Communist Party (b) in 1931, and was appointed a lieutenant in the NKVD in Kharkiv Oblast in February 1936. According to former political prisoner Anton Antonov-Ovseyenko:

At work in the Ukraine in 1937 was a certain Lieutenant Ivan Dolgikh. He was famous for the fact that during torture-and-interrogation sessions he made arrested members of the Central Committee drink their own urine. His resourcefulness and zeal in rooting out "enemies" were noticed."

Dolgikh was promoted to the rank of captain in November 1941, and appointed deputy head of the NKVD in Khabarovsk Krai. In 1945, he was appointed head of the NKVD in Khabarovsk Krai. He was head of Gulag in 1951–54. In May 1954, he led the commission which opened negotiations with prisoners at the Kengir labour camp, in Kazakhstan, who had revolted and taken control of the camp. Dolgikh conceded to some minor demands, including the transfer of prison guards who were particularly hated, whilst forbidding food or medicines to be shipped to the camp. The rebellion was violently suppressed (unarmed people including women were crushed by T-34 tanks caterpillars) in June 1954. In 1955–56, Dolgikh was an inspector at the USSR Ministry of Internal Affairs.

In 1956, Nikita Khrushchev denounced the crimes of the Stalin era, in his Secret speech to the 20th Congress of the CPSU. Shortly afterward, Dolgikh was found guilty of 'flagrant violations of socialist law', sacked, stripped of his rank, and expelled from the Communist Party.

Dolgikh died in 1961.
