= Norilsk uprising =

1953 uprising by Gulag inmates in Krasnoyarsk Krai, Russia

- Part of the Gulag uprisings during de-Stalinization
Date	26 May – 4 August 1953
Location	Gorlag, Norillag, Norilsk, Krasnoyarsk Krai, RSFSR
Result	Uprising suppressed

Belligerents
Prisoners	Soviet Union: Ministry of Internal Affairs

Commanders and leaders
Pavel Frenkel; Mikhail Izmailov; Boris Shamaev; Ivan Vorobyov; Yevhen Hrytsiak; Pavel Filnev; Aleksandra Zelenskaya	Mikhail Kuznetsov; Alexander Sirotkin; Ivan Semyonov

Strength
16,378 people	No data

Casualties and losses
1,000 people killed and wounded	No data

The Norilsk uprising was a major strike by Gulag inmates in Gorlag, an MVD special camp for political prisoners, and later in the two camps of Norillag [ITL], Norilsk, USSR, now Russia, in the summer of 1953, shortly after Joseph Stalin's death. About 70% of inmates were Ukrainians, some of whom had been sentenced to 25 years because of MGB accusations of being involved in the "Bandera standard"; however, the Soviet secret police was notorious for fabricating such accusations. It was the first major revolt within the Gulag system in 1953–1954, although earlier numerous cases of unrest in gulags are known. It was led by Pavel Frenkiel in the first camp, Boris Shamaev in the third camp, Yevhen Hrytsyak in the fourth, Pavel Filnev in the fifth, and Lesya Zelenska in the sixth camp.

== History ==
Between May 26 and August 4, 1953, the inmates of the Gorlag-Main camp went on worker' strike, which lasted 69 days. This was the longest uprising in the history of the Gulag. According to Soviet archives, there were up to 16,378 inmates on strike at the same time. It is significant that the uprising took place before the arrest of Lavrentiy Beria and its suppression coincided with news of his arrest. The preconditions for the uprising can be seen as the following: the arrival of waves of prisoners to the Gorlag, who had participated in the uprisings of 1952, the death of Stalin on March 5, 1953, and the fact that the amnesty that followed his death only applied to (non-political) criminals and convicts with short prison terms, the percentage of which was very low in Gorlag. There were two camp systems in the vicinity of Norilsk. The majority of inmates in special camp Gorlag had been convicted for political crimes. The majority of prisoners in Norillag belonged to non-political criminals, so called bytoviki. The uprising was provoked by the shooting of several prisoners on the orders of the camp administration. All categories of inmates took part in the uprising, with the leading roles played by former military men and participants of national liberation movements of western Ukraine, Lithuania, Latvia, Estonia and Georgia.

The inmates did not have any weapons, although initially during the inquest it was suggested by the Ministry of Internal Affairs to classify the uprising as "an anti-Soviet armed counter-revolutionary uprising". (Eventually the Soviet court used the term "mass insubordination of the inmates to the camp administration".) The action was not simply a strike: actions included a wide spectrum of nonviolent forms of protest within the Soviet law: meetings, letters to government, hunger strikes. For this reason, the term "Uprising of the Spirit" was suggested, as a form of nonviolent protest against the Gulag system. An account of life in the Norlisk Gulag, and the uprising, can be found in the memoirs of inmate Danylo Shumuk.

== See also ==
- List of uprisings in the Gulag
