= Akukan mine =

Mine in Russia

The Akukan mine (Russian: Рудник Акукан) operated during 1927-1932 for the excavation of muscovite (potash mica). It was located in the Akukan Ravine north of Baikal Lake, Buryatia, 40 km North-East-East off Nizhneangarsk, 7 km North of the village Kholodnaya (now settlement Kholodnoye, 55.88243°N 109.76177°E).

There are documentary indications that to man the mine a Special-Purpose Camp (lager osobogo naznachenia) of OGPU was operated. It held both regular criminals and political convicts. At the same time there are documents regarding the use of the labor of "special settlers". In August 1932 the mine was closed as exhausted. The locals refer to the mine site as "the former labor camp". In the collection "The Beloved Northern Land" compiled by N.K Kiselyova the place is referred to both as a labor camp and a special settlement. It is conjectured that the camp operated until 1931, and the special settlement thereafter.

In 1930 it held about 200 inmates and there was an uprising and escape of the inmates.

Currently a tourist trail exists from the automobile road, then from the Kholodnaya river along the mountain trail.

A memorial cross is installed at the location.
