= Odil Yoqubov =

- Born: 20 October 1926; Turkistan, Kazakh SSR, USSR
- Died: 21 December 2009 (aged 83); Tashkent, Uzbekistan
- Citizenship: Soviet Union → Uzbekistan
- Education: National University of Uzbekistan
- Occupations: writer, journalist, translator
- Writing career
- Language: uzbek
- Period: 1951-2009
- Notable awards: People's writer of Uzbekistan

Odil Yoqubov (20 October 1926 – 21 December 2009) was an Uzbek writer and recipient of the title "People's writer of Uzbekistan".

== Biography ==
He wrote dozens of novels and was celebrated as a writer, both in the Soviet era as in the first decade of the independence of Uzbekistan since 1991. He served as chairman of the Uzbek Writers Union from 1987 to 1992. Also, he was editor-in-chief of the newspaper "Uzbekistan Literature and Art," and heading the Uzbek state film studio.

He was vice president of the Assembly of Culture of Central Asia and served in the Congress of People's Deputies while Mikhail Gorbachev was president.

His writing reflected care for people's demands of officials and a skeptic attitude towards the state.

Yoqubov raised important political issues, such as cotton monoculture and Uzbek soldiers dying during the Soviet–Afghan War, during sessions of the Congress of People's Deputies.

Among Yoqubov's most famous publications in the Uzbek language are the short stories titled "Peers," "Two Loves," "Muqaddas," "Bird Wings," and novels "It's Not Easy To Become A Man," "Treasures of Ulugbek," "Conscience," "White-White Swans," and "Justice."

He was a close friend of the Kyrgyz writer Chingiz Aitmatov. He was buried at Chigʻatoy Cemetery in Tashkent.
