= Gorlag =

MVD special camp in the Gulag system

Gorlag or Gorny Camp Directorate, Special Camp No. 2 (Горлаг — Горный лагерь, Особый лагерь No. 2, Особлаг No. 2) ) was an MVD special camp for political prisoners within the Gulag system of the Soviet Union. It was established on February 28, 1948 on the part of the premises of Norillag, Norilsk, Krasnoyarsk Krai, RSFSR. In 1954, after Stalin's death it was merged back into Norillag (Norilsk ITL), which was closed in 1957 together with most of the Gulag system.
