= Ivan Ziatyk =

Ukrainian Catholic priest and martyr

Blessed Ivan Ziatyk CSsR
- Born: December 26, 1899; Odrekhova, Austrian Galicia, Austria-Hungary (now Odrzechowa, Poland)
- Died: May 17, 1952 (aged 52); Ozerlag prison camp, Russian SFSR, Soviet Union (defunct; now part of Irkutsk Oblast, Russia)
- Cause of death: prisoner abuse, hypothermia
- Beatified: April 24, 2001 by John Paul II

Ivan Ziatyk CSsR (Ukrainian: Іван Зятик, pronounced [iˈwɑn ˈzʲɑtɪk]; December 26, 1899 – May 17, 1952) was a Ukrainian Catholic priest, Redemptorist, and lecturer, considered to be a martyr by the Catholic Church.

== Early life ==
Ziatyk was born on December 26, 1899, the day after Gregorian Christmas, in the hamlet of Odrekhova near Sanok in southeastern Poland. He and his older brother Mykhailo were born to Maria and Stefan Ziatyk, who were rural peasants who lived in poverty. The family were Ukrainian Greek Catholics. His father Stefan died when Ivan was 14 years old.

== Seminary ==
In his late teenage years, Ziatyk decided to prepare for the Catholic priesthood. In 1919, he entered the Ukrainian Catholic seminary in Przemyśl where he studied Christian spirituality, philosophy, theology together with the history and liturgy of the Byzantine rite of Catholic Church. He was ordained to the diaconate and then priesthood in 1923. From 1925 until 1935, Ziatyk worked the seminary as a prefect and lecturer. In addition to his role as the spiritual director for seminarians, he lectured in dogmatic theology and catechetics. He also performed a similar role at the local girls' gymnasium.

== Life as a Redemptorist ==
Despite resistance from this superiors in the Church, on June 15, 1935, Ziatyk began his novitiate with the Redemptorists. Although he was already an ordained priest, he was required to spend a year in the novitiate, located in Hołosko, a town just outside Lwów (now Holosko, a suburb of Lviv, Ukraine), making his first profession in August 1936.

During his first year as a Redemptorist, Ziatyk lived in the monastery dedicated to Our Lady of Perpetual Help in Stanisławów (now Ivano-Frankivsk, Ukraine). However, in autumn of the following year, he moved back to Lwów, to support a monastery there whose director had been absent, serving as both assistant superior and treasurer. In 1938, he was appointed to teach dogmatic theology at the newly opened seminary back in Hołosko.

In 1941, Ziatyk was made superior of the monastery dedicated to the Dormition of the Mother of God in German-occupied Tannstadt (now Ternopil, Ukraine), where he served until taking the same position at a monastery in Zboiska in 1944. There, he also served as an educator for teenage boys interested in becoming Redemptorists at the local gymnasium.

== Persecution and death ==
After the Second World War, the Soviet regime renewed its oppression of Christian denominations. The Soviets sought to abolish the Ukrainian Catholic Church by merging it with the Ukrainian Orthodox Church, which was considered easier to control as it was both state-sanctioned and did not acknowledge the spiritual leadership of the Bishop of Rome.

In 1946, all Greek-Catholic bishops were arrested and, by spring, the Soviet secret police had arrested all Redemptorists in Ternopil, Stanislaviv, Lviv, and Zboiska, relocating them to an unheated wing of the monastery in Holosko. Members of the order gathered at the monastery had their activities constantly monitored by the secret police for the next two years. The members of the community were also subjected to periodic interrogation, where they were asked to betray their religion and fellow arrestees in exchange for relief. When Archbishop Joseph Slipyj was arrested, he delegated the Belgian priest Joseph De Vocht to lead the church. On October 17, 1948, all the Redemptorists in Holosko were transported to a Studite monastery in Univ. After De Vocht was deported back to Belgium in late-1948, he appointed Ziatyk to take his place.

Eventually, Ziatyk came under extreme scrutiny; Soviet leadership called for his arrest on January 5, 1950 and a warrant for his arrest was issued on January 20. He was apprehended on January 24 and withstood several interrogations before finally, on February 4, being formally accused of "promot[ing] the ideas of the Roman Pope, of spreading the Catholic Faith among the nations of the whole world and of making all Catholics". The case lasted two years, during which Ziatyk lived in prisons in Lviv and Zolochiv. During his internment, he was interrogated 72 times, all at night and often accompanied with prisoner abuse.

On November 21, 1951, Ziatyk was convicted to 10 years imprisonment and forced labor at Ozerlag prison camp for "cooperating with anti-Soviet nationalistic organization and anti-Soviet propaganda". During his imprisonment, he was repeatedly tortured. On Good Friday 1952, he was taken from his cell, beaten with sticks, soaked in water, and exposed in the Siberian wilderness. He died in the prison hospital on May 17, 1952. He is buried in "Cemetery 373 in the Lake Baikal zone, in the district of Tajshet in the region of Irkyts’k [sic]".

In an interview with one of Ziatyk's fellow prisoners, Antolii Medellian, he said:

[Fr. Ivan Ziatyk] stood and prayed the whole day; for the whole day, he prayed every moment. He was such a pleasant person to talk to. You could hear many wise and instructive words from him; this was especially so in my case, as at that time I was a youngster.

On April 6, 2001, the Holy See recognized Ivan Ziatyk as being a martyr and he was beatified by Pope John Paul II on June 27, the feast of Our Lady of Perpetual Help, the patroness of the Redemptorists.
