= Virchenko =

Virchenko is a surname. Notable people with the surname include:

- Nina Virchenko (born 1930), Ukrainian mathematician
- Oleksii Virchenko (born 2001), Ukrainian Paralympic swimmer
