= Algirdas Petrusevičius =

Lithuanian politician (born 1937)

Algirdas Petrusevičius (born 23 February 1937 in Klaipėda) is an anti-Soviet dissident, partisan and political prisoner, a leader in the creation of Lithuania's army, an inventor of weapons for guerrilla warfare, and a member of Lithuania's parliament from 1996 to 2000.

== Biography ==
From 1953 to 1956, Algirdas Petrusevičius was second-in-command in the Kaunas underground organization "Geležinis vilkas" (Iron Wolf). On Lithuania's independence day, February 16, 1956, he raised the Lithuanian flag in the Kaunas city hall square. In the subsequent gun battle, he was arrested, sentenced and imprisoned in Siberia, being held at Ozerlag near Tayshet. He twice attempted escape, was wounded and lost his arm. He returned to Lithuania in 1968.

From 1990 to 1993 he led the newly independent Lithuania's Defense Department weapons arsenal "Vytis". He invented pistol-machine guns Vytis suitable for guerilla war, as well as hand grenades, and along with his colleagues, land mines. In 1996, he was elected chairman of the Union of Volunteer Founders of Lithuania's Army.

From 1996 to 2000 he was a member of Lithuania's parliament Seimas as part of the Tėvynės sąjunga party. In Seimas, he was a member of the committee for security and defence.

In 2007, he was sentenced to four years of detention for illegal use of weapons after political provocation in the style of Russian secret services: using this case conservative party was discredited twice - before municipality elections in 2007 and parliament election 2008. Lithuania's supreme court voided the sentence. Afterwards, his trial was begun anew.
