= Lychakivskyi District =

Coordinates: 49.8331°N 24.0833°E

Lychakivskyi District Личаківський район
- Urban district in Lviv
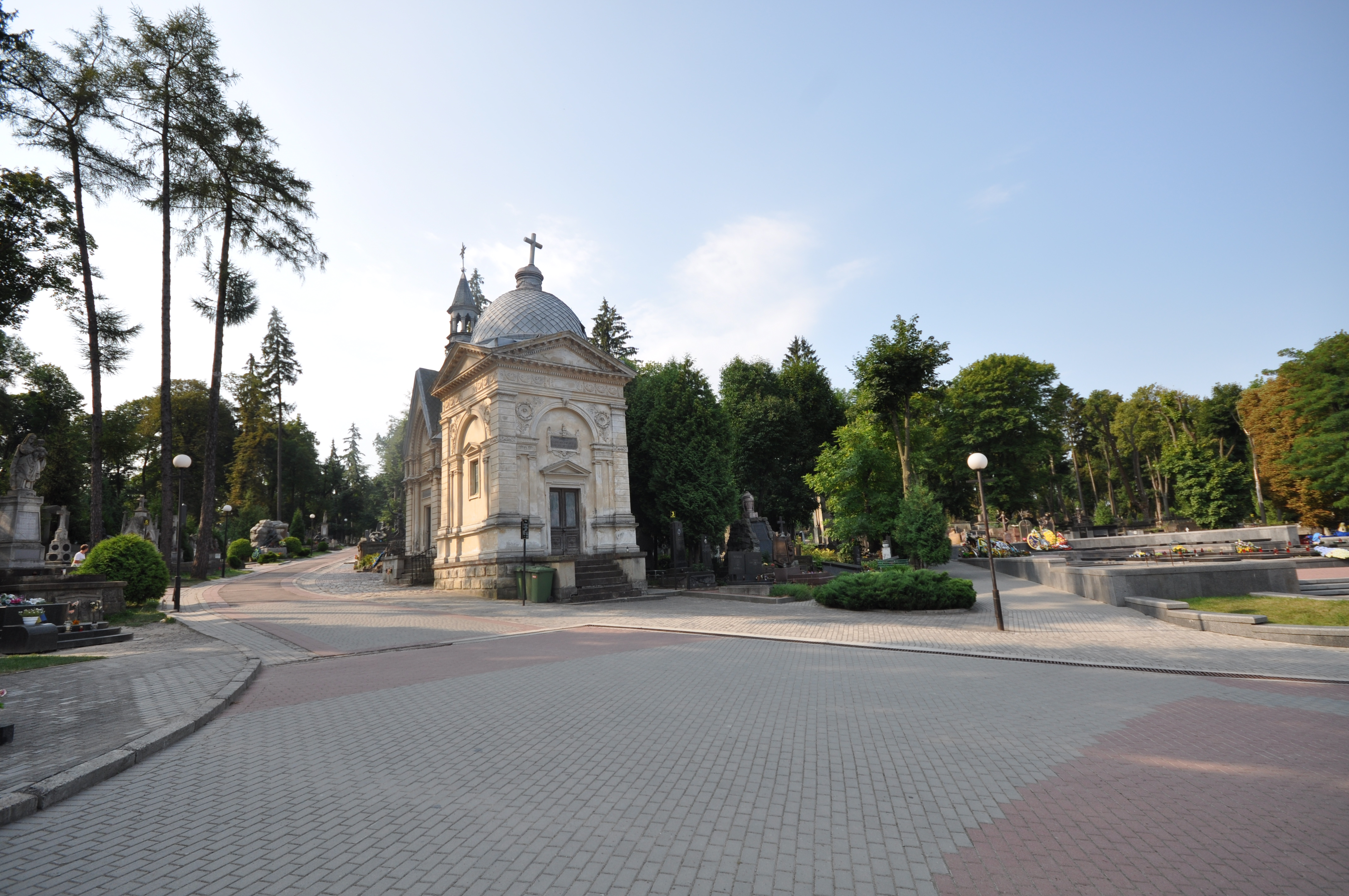
- Lychakiv Cemetery

- Map of Lviv and its districts with Lychakivskyi highlighted in red.
- Country: Ukraine
- Oblast: Lviv Oblast

Population
  - Total: 102,639
- Time zone: EET

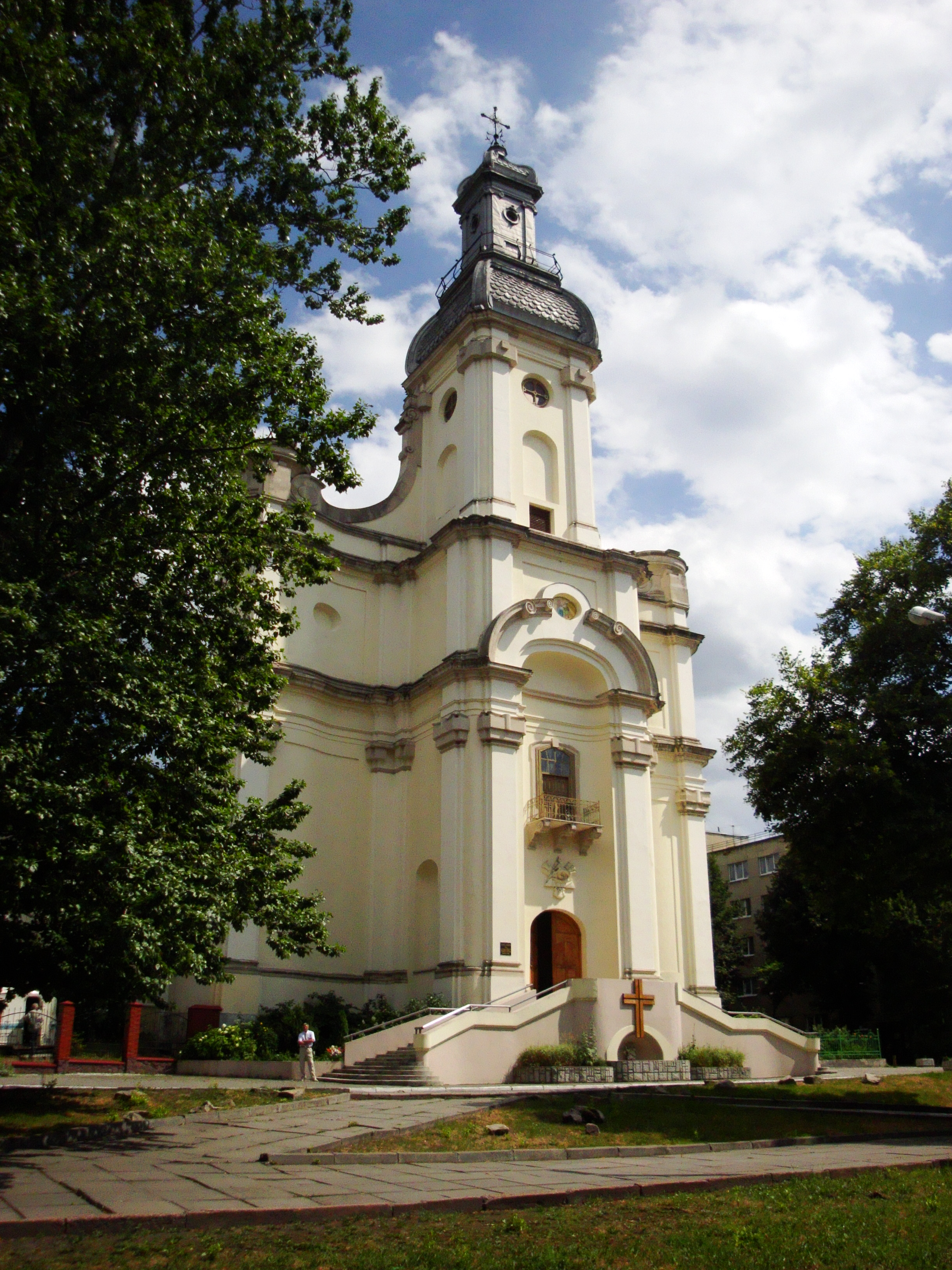
Church of Holy Trinity

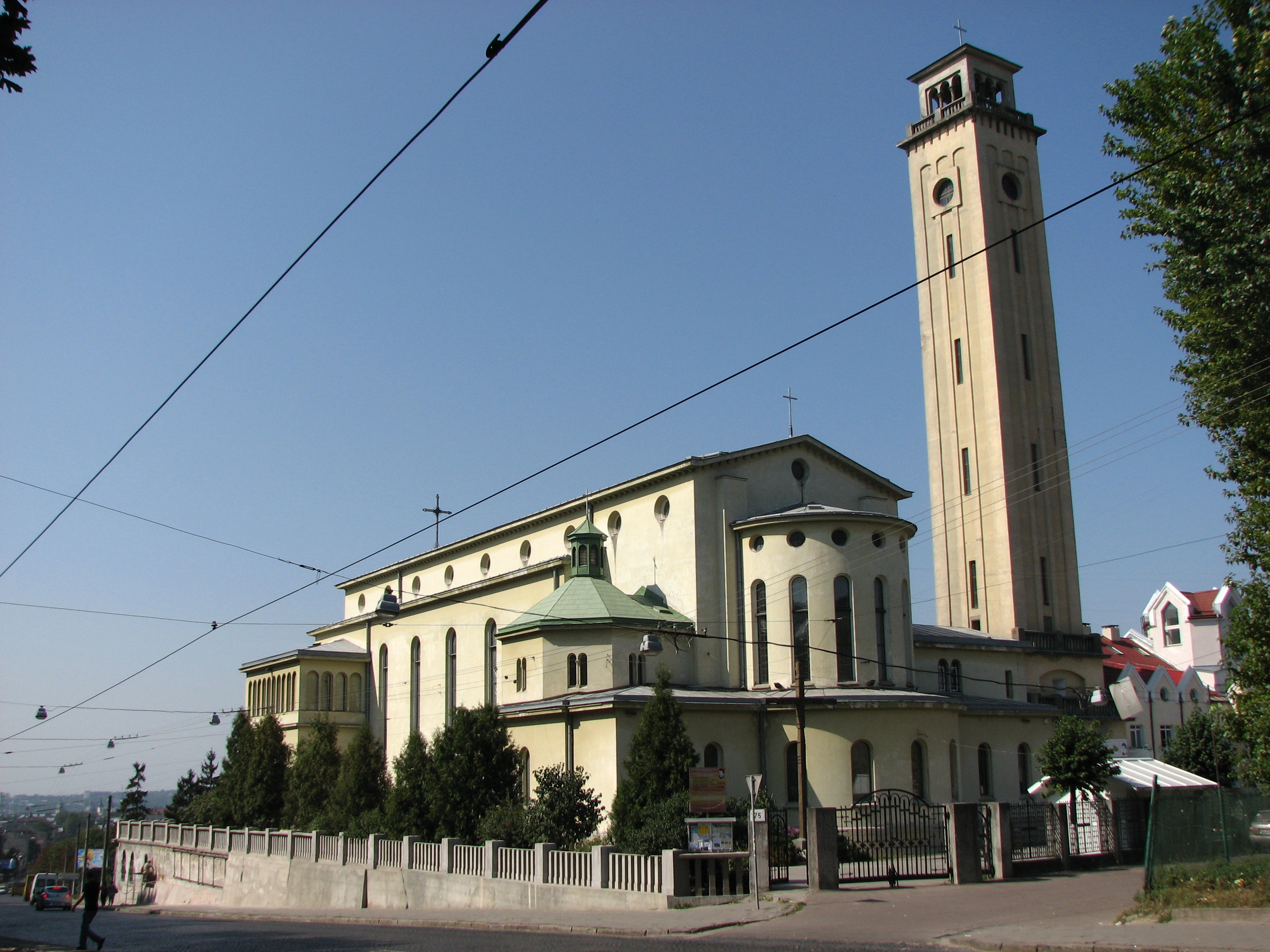
Church of the Intercession

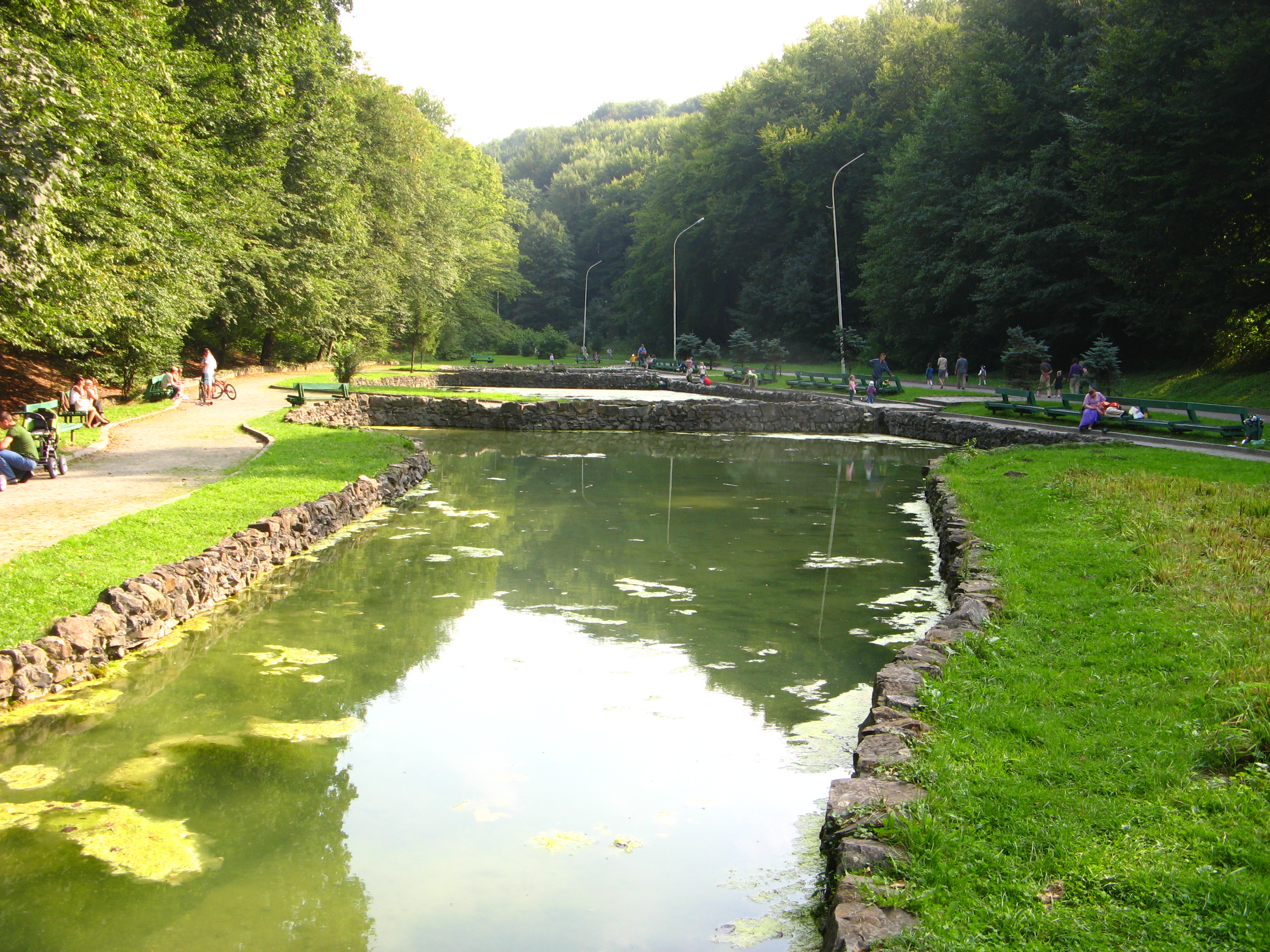
Pohulianka park

Lychakivskyi District (Ukrainian: Личаківський район) is an urban district of the city of Lviv, named after the historical district of Lychakiv. This district covers eastern part of the city. It contains such neighborhoods as Mayorivka, Pasiky, Pohulianka, Yalivets and Lychakiv itself. In the east it includes the Vynnyky forest, which borders the city of Vynnyky.

== Historical localities ==
=== Lychakiv ===
Lychakiv was historically famous for the local cabbage, which was sold on Lviv's markets both fresh and as sauerkraut. A popular local dish of red cabbage with apples is named after the locality. Inhabitants of the area also traditionally engaged in trade with buckwheat and other grains. During the mid-19th century a chapel dedicated to Virgin Mary, the patroness of Lychakiv, was constructed by locals on the road to Hlyniany. Destroyed by Soviet authorities in 1959, it was restored in 1998.

In 1894 an electric tram line was opened between downtown Lviv and Lychakiv, despite the protests of local cabmen. In 1914 the route was expanded to Lychakiv railway station, and by the late 1930s reached the neighbourhood of Pasichna. The line to Lychakiv was the most profitable of the early tram lines in Lviv. In modern times the line is popular among students living in nearby dormitories.

In times of Austrian and Polish rule Lychakiv was known as the most criminal suburb of Lviv. Members of street gangs (batiars) were locally nicknamed "antyk" or "antek", possibly after the local parish church of Saint Anthony.

==== Military cemetery ====
Following the occupation of Lviv by Russian troops, in 1915 a military cemetery for the Russian dead was established on the lands of Sofia Jabłonowska in Lychakiv. Austrian soldiers killed during fights over the city were buried on the nearby plots of Lychakiv Cemetery. After the city's liberation by Austrians in June 1915 the area was reserved for the burial of Austrian army personnel (including Ukrainian Sich Riflemen), and fighters of the allied German and Ottoman armies, both of Christian and Muslim faiths. Victims of the June 1941 Soviet massacres were also buried at the cemetery.

After the Second World War Soviet authorities demolished much of the Austrian-era cemetery and used the territory for own burials. The lower part of the cemetery, where many soldiers of the Soviet Army were interred, became known as the "Field of Mars". In 1989 a cross in memory of the participants of 1918 November Uprising was installed on the location by members of Memorial society, and in 1996 a monument to the victims of Soviet repression was established nearby. During the 2010s a number of memorials to Austro-Hungarian soldiers of different ethnicities were opened on the territory of former cemetery. Soviet burials, meanwhile, served as a place for Communist demonstrations.

In 2021, as part of Decommunization in Ukraine, the Soviet Red star was removed from the cemetery. Following the Russian invasion of Ukraine in 2022, Lviv's authorities adopted a project, according to which the area will be transformed into a memorial cemetery for Ukrainian soldiers. In 2023 the first stage of exhumation works was finished, with the remains of Soviet servicemen being transferred to Holosko cemetery.

==== Church of the Holy Trinity ====
The Church of Holy Trinity, initially known as the monastery church of the Benedictine Order of Perpetual Adoration of the Holy Sacrament, is one of the oldest buildings in the district. Founded in 1718, it was rebuilt starting from 1743 and reconstructed in 1902-1904. In Soviet times the church was transferred to Lviv Veterinarian Institute and used as a sports hall. In 1995 the restored building was transferred to the Ukrainian Greek Catholic Church.

==== Church of the Intercession ====
Initially known as the Catholic Church of Our Lady of Ostra Brama, the building was erected shortly before Second World War on a hill above Lychakivska Street, which runs downwards in the direction of the city centre. In Soviet times it served as a warehouse, but in 1992 was transferred to the Greek Catholic Church. The 60-meter high belltower is designed in Florentine style and provides a panorama of the whole city.

=== Pohulianka ===
The area of Pohulianka is located along the Pasika stream, a tributary of Poltva. Starting from the 17th century, a local spring supplied water to Lviv's Old Town. The area was historically known as a popular place for picnics, where summer residences of many well-off Leopolitans were located. In 1911 a Mennonite community acquired a villa in the area.

== See also ==
- Urban districts of Ukraine
