= Adam Stankievič =

Belarusian Roman Catholic priest, politician, and writer

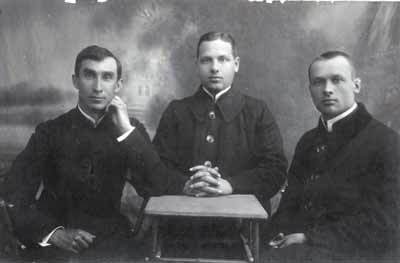
Photo of Belarusian Roman Catholic priest writers (from left to right) Janka Bylina (1883—1956) Adam Stankievič (1892—1949) Kazimier Svajak (1890—1926)

Adam Stankievič (Belarusian: Адам Станкевіч, Polish: Adam Stankiewicz, January 6, 1892 – November 29, 1949) was a Belarusian Roman Catholic priest, politician and writer. Stankievič was one of ideologists of the Belarusian Christian democratic movement in the early 20th century.

Adam Stankievič was born in Arlianiaty (now in Hrodna Voblast), near Ashmyany. In 1914 he graduated from a priest seminary in Vilna (Vilnius in Lithuanian). Adam Stankievič was one of the founders of the Belarusian Christian Democratic Union and the Belarusian Christian Democracy. He was one of the first priests to use Belarusian language in church services.

In December 1919 Adam Stankievič became member of the exiled Rada of the Belarusian Democratic Republic. He was an active member of the Belarusian national movement in Poland-controlled West Belarus. In 1922 he was elected to the Sejm as member of the Bloc of National Minorities.

Unlike his fellow-villager, the notable West Belarusian politician and scientist Jan Stankievič, Adam refused to cooperate with the Germans after their invasion in Poland. During World War II he lived in Vilnius where he published Belarusian religious literature. At this time Stankievič remained outside of the Belarusian political movement, rejecting any possibility of collaborating with the Nazi Germans. In many ways he assisted the anti-German resistance and especially the persecuted Jews whom he often harbored in his church.

In 1944 Adam Stankievič refused to flee from Belarus with the retreating German armies. He was arrested by Soviet authorities soon after re-installation of Soviet control over Vilnius. In 1949 he was sent to the Ozerlag camp near Taishet, Irkutsk oblast, where he died.
