= Leo Bauer =

German politician and journalist

Leopold Bauer
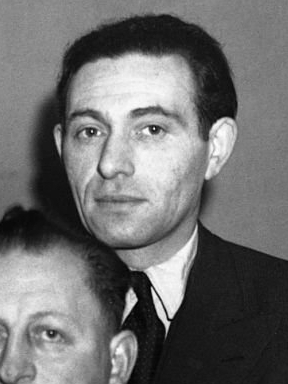
- Bauer in 1947
- Born: Eliezer Lippa Ben Jossip David ha Cohen; 18 December 1912; Skalat, Eastern Galicia, Austro-Hungary
- Died: 18 September 1972 (aged 59); Bonn, West Germany
- Occupations: Political activist Political journalist Special advisor to Chancellor Brandt
- Political party: SPD; KPD; SED
- Spouse: 1. Aenne

Leopold Bauer (born Eliezer Lippa Ben Jossip David ha Cohen: 18 December 1912 – 18 September 1972) was a German political activist and journalist, originally from Galicia. For reasons of race and politics he spent the twelve Nazi years in exile. That eventful period included more than one year locked up by the authorities in Switzerland where grounds for his conviction included "damaging [Swiss] neutrality" ("Verletzung der Neutralität"). After 1945 he remained politically engaged. In 1953 he was deported by a military court in East Berlin to the Soviet Union for execution. In the event his sentence was commuted to a 25-year stretch in a Siberian labor camp. Then in October 1955, he was released to West Germany in the context of a general agreement between the governments in Bonn and Moscow for the return of surviving German prisoners of war. Leo Bauer later became a specialist advisor to Chancellor Brandt on East-West German relations ("Ostpolitik").

== Life ==
=== Provenance and early years ===
Leopold Bauer was born in Skalat, a small town in Eastern Galicia which at that time was part of the Austro-Hungarian empire. (Today it is in western Ukraine.) His father was a watchmaker and a gold trader. During the second half of the nineteenth century the population of Skalat had been boosted by the arrival of large numbers of Jews seeking to escape the pogroms taking place in the western territories of Russia. There are estimates that by 1900 approximately 50% of the town's population were Jewish. In July 1914 war broke out. According to one source it was in order to get away from more pogroms that the family fled to the west. Elsewhere it is stated simply that they wished to get away from the advancing Russians. They ended up in Chemnitz, in southern central Germany which is where Leo Bauer attended school between 1919 and 1930. He was granted German citizenship in 1924 or 1925.

- "There were two things that made me ripe for the propaganda of the communists: their evidently unrelenting battle against the Nazis and their enthusiastic commitment to social revolution"
- "Zwei Grunde waren es, die mich reif für die Propaganda der Kommunisten machten – ihr scheinbar konsequenter Kampf gegen die Nazis und ihr begeistertes Eintreten für die soziale Revolution."
  Leo Bauer, quoted by Nina Grunenberg in 1984

At school, while still only fourteen, Bauer was influenced by a teacher who was a member of the Social Democratic Party (SPD) to join the Young Socialists ("Sozialistische Arbeiter-Jugend") in 1927. The next year he joined the party itself. The period was one of renewed economic austerity and intensifying political polarisation: Bauer quickly became involved in the confrontations that the organised labour movement was facing. In 1930 the family moved to Berlin. Instead of moving to a new school, during 1931/32 he was privately tutored. In 1932 he passed the school final exam (Abitur), which opened the way to university-level education. Politically he tended towards the left wing of the Social Democratic Party. He switched to the Socialist Workers' Party ("Sozialistische Arbeiterpartei Deutschlands" / SAP) in 1931, and to the Communists in 1932.

=== University and régime change ===
In 1932 he enrolled at Berlin University and embarked on a degree course covering Jurisprudence and Applied Economics ("Nationalökonomie "). His situation changed swiftly after the Hitler government took power in January 1933 and lost no time in transforming Germany into a one-party dictatorship. The antisemitism that in 1932 had merely been a toxic rhetorical device for populist politicians was now transformed into a core pillar of government strategy. Leopold Bauer was excluded from his university studies because of his Jewish provenance and/or of his illegal political activism.

During 1932/33 Bauer was employed by the party's "M-Apparat", which operated in Germany till 1937 as the Communist Party's (rather misleadingly named) intelligence branch. Within the organisation he was known by the code name "Rudi". The Communist Party had been targeted with increased intensity by the authorities since the end of February 1933 and Bauer, by now aged 21, was one of many party comrades arrested and detained during March 1933. He was placed in a recently completed concentration camp. It was only with the help of a former school friend who had now joined the "SA" (a Nazi paramilitary organisation) that his release was secured in June 1933. (The friend was himself shot a year later in the context of the so-called Röhm purge.) Bauer resumed his illegal activity for the "M-Apparat".

=== National Socialist years and exile ===
In December 1933, using the cover name "Rudolf Katz", he emigrated to Prague from where, with other comrades, he was ordered by the party leadership to move on in February 1934 to Paris. Over the next few years, he worked against the National Socialist régime in Germany. He helped found and participated in the "Friends' Circle of the German Popular Front", and from 1935 involved himself in refugee support. Between 1936 and 1939, still based in Paris, he served as Assistant Secretary to the League of Nations High Commissioner for Refugees from Germany. Both Paris and Prague were centres of political activity for exiled German Communists during the middle and (in the case of Paris) later 1930s. After the Munich Agreement Leo Bauer was sent back to Prague where, again using the pseudonym "Rudolf Katz" he played a central role in organsising the evacuation of German Communist Party cadres to England.

War broke out in September 1939 and for most Parisians there were few immediate changes. That was not the experience of several thousand German political refugees who had sought refuge from persecution by moving to Paris, however. Leo Bauer was among those arrested in Paris in September 1939. He was held in a succession of internment camps between then and the Franco-German armistice of June 1940. In July 1940 he managed to escape to Switzerland with his party comrade Paul Bertz. In Switzerland he lived illegally under the identity of a bank employee in Geneva and the name "Paul-Eric Perret". He became a Communist Party informant/contact ("Vertrauensmann") in West Switzerland and took part in "frontier work" involving the Franco-Swiss border.

Leo Bauer met Noel Field in October 1941. There is no consensus between sources over whether Field should be regarded principally an American spy working to undermine the Soviet Union or a Soviet spy working, during the war years, in France and Switzerland to support Jewish communist and anti-fascist refugees. There were more Geneva meetings between Bauer and Field between October 1941 and October 1942, with Bauer serving as a link man between Noel Field and the exiled Communist Party leader Paul Bertz, who was hiding in Bern (central Switzerland). The meetings evidently came to the attention of the Swiss authorities, and on 27 October 1942 the bank clerk and espionage suspect Paul-Eric Perret (as Leo Bauer was still known in this context) was arrested at his Geneva home. At the same time significant quantities of incriminating material relating to his party work were found. For Bauer a year of investigatory detention followed. He faced trial and was convicted in October 1943, found guilty of passport falsification, intelligence activities, "damaging [Swiss] neutrality" and "communist activities". The sentence was a thirty-month jail term of which twelve months had already been served during investigatory detention. He appears to have spent his time in investigatory detention and several subsequent months in the Saint-Antoine prison, after which he was moved to the Bassecourt internment camp, recently created for "political detainees".

In May 1944 he secured early release from the internment camp at Bassecourt, albeit subject to post-release conditions and monitoring (Aufbewahrungspflicht. In June 1944 he began to work for the National Committee for a Free Germany, an organisation having its origins in the prisoner of war camps of the Soviet Union which, during the final part of the war, was extending its remit outside the Soviet Union. Bauer became its regional leader for western Switzerland. He established links to the Swiss Party of Labour (Partei der Arbeit der Schweiz / PdA), established earlier that year by members of the (since 1940 illegal) Communist Party of Switzerland. He also became secretary to the Centrale sanitaire suisse (CSS), a medical welfare organisation originally set up seven years earlier to help ("internationalist" anti-Franco) victims of the Spanish Civil War. Among conservative elements in Switzerland it is still viewed as seriously "left-wing", and in 1944 the CSS was believed to be closely aligned with the Communist Party.

=== Postwar Germany (US occupation zone) ===
Leo Bauer returned to Germany in July 1945. He returned not to his former home city of Chemnitz, which was now part of the Soviet occupation zone, but to Frankfurt am Main which was becoming the principal military and administrative center for the American occupation zone. Here he established himself as the Frankfurt representative of the CSS. There are also references for his having also been operating as a secret informant ("geheimer Mitarbeiter") for one of the Soviet intelligence services during his time in Frankfurt. He would later recall that during this period he heard himself described by a senior party comrade as "the kind of highly ambitious young party official who evidently wanted to go all the way to the top". (Note: der Typ eines sehr ehrgeizigen jungen KPD-Funktionärs der ganz nach oben kommen möchte.") Frankfurt was the principal city in the newly configured State of Hesse. With the western two-thirds of Germany carved into four separate military occupation zones, Bauer fought enthusiastically for a unified "antifascist Democratic Germany". From Bauer's communist perspective that ambition failed because (except in the Soviet occupation zone) negotiations to merge the (neo-communist) Socialist Unity Party with the Social Democratic Party failed. During the later 1940s Leo Bauer emerged as a leading figure in the regional Communist Party leadership team, and as one of the most prominent politicians in Hesse, though he also found it all too easy to generate mistrust, even among party comrades. Leo Bauer never made any attempt to present himself as a "typical" Communist party official. He dressed well and presented himself as self-confident and cosmopolitan. He was happy to discuss with people from a range of different countries, from different parties and from a broad range of social backgrounds. One commentator suggests that this was because most of his exile from Nazi Germany was spent in Paris and Geneva, both intellectually dynamic and diverse cities. But the thirty men who had flown into Berlin on 30 April 1930 with a carefully honed nation-building programme for Germany had lived for twelve years in Moscow during the most oppressive years of Stalin's dictatorship. The public face of Germany's political leadership team in the Soviet occupation zone was Walter Ulbricht.

During 1945/46 Bauer became a freelance contributor to the Frankfurter Rundschau, a mass-market daily newspaper which in August 1945 was the first daily newspaper to be granted a licence by the military administration. During 1946/47 he was also the producer of a party newspaper called "Wissen und Tat" (loosely, "Knowledge and Action"). In February 1946 he was appointed one of the two Communist Party members of the twelve-person Beratender Landesausschuss (loosely, "Advisory State Committee") for the state of Hesse. This was a precursor body to a regional parliament: members were not elected but nominated by their parties and selected according to a complicated (and contentious) process that broadly reflected the balance of support for the parties (leaving out the National Socialists) that had been apparent in 1932, which was the last time free elections had been held in Germany. Elections were held in December 1946 and Leo Bauer became one of the ten Communist Party members in the state parliament ("Landtag"). He was deputy leader of the Communist Party group in the assembly and a vice-president of the parliament. In reality, his participation in the state parliament came to an end in 1948, however; although he was formally a member till 30 June 1949.

=== Postwar Germany (Soviet occupation zone) ===
Although in the Soviet occupation zone the Communist Party had been merged and relaunched in April 1946 as the Socialist Unity Party, links between the merged party in the Soviet zone and the unmerged Communist Party in the western zones remained close. Bauer's party responsibilities involved driving regularly across to (East) Berlin in order to report on the party's progress in Hesse and receive any instructions that might be provided there via the Soviet military administrators. In October 1947, while driving to one of these meetings, he was involved in a serious traffic accident near Eisenach and, according to one source, obliged to remain in the Soviet occupation zone between 1947 and 1949 in order to recover. It is not clear whether he was completely immobilised or whether he was able to make further visits to the west during this period, but it is clear that East Berlin became his home, and he progressively lost his leading position within the regional party leadership team in Hesse, where his political duties were taken on, formally in 1949, by Ludwig Keil.

In 1949 Leo Bauer became editor-in-chief of Deutschlandsender, a radio station transmitting from the eastern (i.e. Soviet-occupied) part of central Berlin. A new long wave transmitter had been installed in 1947 in order to extend the reach of a service committed to the "ideological rearmament" ("ideologische Aufrüstung") of the western occupation zones. There are indications that Bauer's approach was sometimes out of line with the culturally dour preconceptions of the Ulbricht party establishment. He refused to start the daily transmissions with "light morning music", insisting instead that "Bach and Mozart are just right for the workers' breakfast time" ("Bach und Mozart sind für die Arbeiter zum Frühstück gerade gut genug"). It must also have been in 1949 that exchanged his Communist Party membership for membership of the Socialist Unity Party ("Sozialistische Einheitspartei Deutschlands" / SED) which was by now well on its way to becoming the ruling party in a new kind of German one-party dictatorship. Very quickly things now began to turn sour. Bauer found himself on the receiving end of pointed criticisms from the increasingly powerful Party Central Committee, both with respect to his political views and regarding his lifestyle choices. Bauer was inclined to dismiss this as the result of "petty intruge" ("kleinliche Intrige") orchestrated by Walter Ulbricht, and refused to appreciate the dangers he faced. He was certainly not inclined to see evil in The Party, which he still saw as "the only path to a meaningful life" ("der einzige Weg zu einem sinnvollen Leben "). Bauer needed the party and the party still had a use for him, but fast moving political currents were emerging to undermine him: he was becoming all too dispensable.

=== Purge victim ===
On 23 August 1950 Leopold Bauer was arrested because of his former connections with Noel Field (who had been arrested in Czechoslovkia the previous year and then handed over to the Hungarian authorities and subjected to a high-profile show trial). Bauer was suspected of having provided extensive help to the "class enemy". Ulbricht personally identified him as "an agent". Bauer was excluded from The Party on 1 September 1950. It became apparent that this was part of a wider political purge. Other comrades caught up in the arrests included Lex Ende and Willi Kreikemeyer. Paul Merker had been expelled from the party a week earlier. Merker was another of the leading party officers who had spent the Hitler years not in Moscow but in the west: for the "Moscow team" surrounding Walter Ulbricht that in itself seems to have aroused suspicion. There have also been commentators who have pointed out that a remarkably high proportion of East Germany's 1950 purge victims were Jewish.

Leo Bauer and his wife were arrested by the Ministry of State Security ("Stasi"). He was taken to the Stasi investigatory detention center in the Schumannstraße, and then to the main Stasi detention and interrogation center at Berlin-Hohenschönhausen. Then in August 1951 he was transferred again, this time to the Soviet military jail at Berlin-Karlshorst. (The Soviet occupation zone had been relaunched as the Soviet sponsored German Democratic Republic (East Germany) in October 1949, but fraternal military administrators remained present in large numbers at the Soviet military complex in Karlshorst.) During questioning Bauer was tortured both by his German and by his Russian interrogators. In his 150-page confession he incriminated not only himself, but friends and comrades.

Sources are not fully consistent as to the date of Bauer's trial; but it appears to have been on 28 December 1952 that he was convicted by a Soviet military tribunal and, identified as an "American spy", sentenced to death by shooting. His former political comrade (and according to at least one source former life-partner), Erica Glaser was a co-accused at the same hearing: she was given the same verdict and sentence. In January 1953 he was deported from Berlin to the Soviet Union where the sentence was to be carried out. He was still waiting in his death cell some weeks later when Joseph Stalin died. In the end, the death sentence was never carried out. In June 1953, in what was subsequently presented as an official act of mercy ("eine Begnadigung"), a twenty-five-year term in a labour camp in eastern Siberia was substituted. Bauer was detained initially in a punishment camp at Tayshet. He was then transferred to Camp 013 near Bratsk. In November 1954 he was moved again, to the "hospital camp" ("Krankenlager") at Vikhorevka.

=== Krushchev thaw ===
Following the death of Stalin a (cautious) political thaw emerged in the Soviet Union. The new First Party Secretary, Nikita Khrushchev, was keen to reach out to foreign governments so as to try and improve the Soviet Union's international standing. In September 1955, following several months of "behind the scenes diplomacy", Chancellor Adenauer visited Moscow in order to agree the return home of the surviving German detainees still being held in the Soviet Union. Negotiations involved slightly under 10,000 prisoners of war who had arrived as members of Hitler's invading armies during the early 1940s and approximately 20,000 German civilians, many of whom had arrived as political refugees and fallen foul of Stalin's purges or been imprisoned in the atmosphere of intensified paranoia that took hold in the Soviet Union following the German invasion of 1941. As a result of the agreement concluded during Adenauer's 1955 visit to Moscow the detainees were permitted to return to Germany with effect from 7 October 1955. Leo Bauer was included.

=== Postwar Germany (German Federal Republic) ===
"What was so remarkable about Leo Bauer?"

- "In his conversations he could confuse you, unsettle you and force you to justify yourself, think again and then rethink through your whole position. He could effortlessly pinpoint the weknesses in the arguments of others and, if he wanted to corner an interlocutor."
- "Er konnte durch seine Gespräche verunsichern, verwirren, zur Selbstbehauptung zwingen, zum Nachdenken und Überdenken bringen, er konnte mühelos beim anderen Schwachstellen aufspüren und, wenn er wollte, ihn oder sie in die Enge treiben."
  Nina Grunenberg in 1984,
  quoting "Karrieren eines Außenseiters, Leo Bauer zwischen Kommunismus und Sozialdemokratie 1912 bis 1972" by P. Brandt, J. Schumacher, G. Schwarzrock & K. Sühl

Since his enforced relocation to the Soviet occupation zone, the three western occupation zones had been merged and relaunched with a new currency in May 1949 as the US sponsored German Federal Republic (West Germany). This was the country to which Leo Bauer now returned, settling in Frankfurt am Main and launching himself on a new career as a "political educator" and journalist. In 1956 he rejoined the Social Democratic Party (from which he had withdrawn in 1931), although for many years there would be those inside the party who found his conversion from communism to social democracy unconvincing.

During 1957/58 Bauer worked as a member of the regular staff of the weekly news magazine Quick. Between 1959 and 1961 he worked as a freelance journalist. Headhunted by Henri Nannen, in 1961 he became social policy editor on another national weekly news magazine, Hamburg-based Stern.

During the middle 1960s, Leopold Bauer joined the circle of advisors around Willy Brandt, who in 1964 had succeeded the recently deceased Erich Ollenhauer as leader of the Social Democratic Party ("Sozialdemokratische Partei Deutschlands" / SPD). Brandt admired Bauer's quick-witted insightfulness, and his deep understanding of the inner workings of the East German Leninist power structure and the workings of the comrades' quasi-socialist society. Brandt was sympathetic of the extent to which Bauer had suffered during his life. Although Bauer's advisory role was initially an informal one, in 1967, when Brandt wanted to reach out to the Communist Party of Italy, he appointed the ex-communist Leo Bauer to travel to Rome on behalf of the SPD party executive to make the first contacts.

Between 1968 and 1972 Bauer was the editor in chief of "Die Neue Gesellschaft", the SPD's rather cerebral monthly political magazine. He also signed a contract with the Friedrich Ebert Foundation as a research associate.

In 1969 Willy Brandt took over from Kurt Georg Kiesinger as Chancellor of Germany and Leo Bauer became a personal advisor to the chancellor, employed in the Federal Chancellery. He advised, principally, on East-West German relations ("Ostpolitik") at a time when the governments on both sides of the internal border were keen to regularise various pieces of unfinished business which had persisted since 1949. Yet despite his position at the heart of the West German political establishment, Bauer remained an outsider. Rumour persisted that Hans-Jürgen Wischnewski regarded Bauer's constant closeness to the chancellor as a threat to his own position of trust as the party's "chief executive" ("Parteigeschäftsführer"). As far as the party's deputy leader was concerned, Bauer himself stated that Helmut Schmidt was "likely to be one of those who believed his own role was diminished because [Bauer] was so firmly ensconced as Brandt's advisor".

Towards the end of his life Leopold Bauer became seriously ill as a result of the torture to which he had been subjected in the 1950s. He was still not quite 60 when he died in Bonn.
