= 35th Infantry Division (Poland) =

Podlaska Cavalry Brigade
- 35 Dywizja Piechoty
- Active: 1939
- Allegiance: Poland
- Branch: Polish Armed Forces
- Type: Cavalry
- Part of: Operational Group Wyszków
- Engagements: World War II: Battle of Lwów

Commanders
- Notable commanders: Jarosław Szafran

35th Infantry Division (Polish: 35. Dywizja Piechoty) was a reserve unit of the Polish Army in the Second Polish Republic. It did not exist in peacetime organization of the army, and was formed between August 31 – September 4, 1939, during the Invasion of Poland.

The division consisted mainly of units which until September 1 manned Fortified Area of Wilno (Obszar Warowny Wilno), and forces of the Border Protection Corps, which guarded northeastern corner of the country. After its formation, the division joined Operational Group Wyszków.

On September 7, 1939, the division, commanded by Colonel Jarosław Szafran, was sent to the area south of Białystok, where it waited for train transports to move it westwards. On the next day however, Polish Commander in Chief Edward Śmigły-Rydz ordered the division to march to the rail junction at Czeremcha, where it boarded trains to Lwów, some 500 kilometers south (see also Battle of Lwów (1939)).

By September 13, 35th Infantry Division was ready to take part in action. On the next day, it manned western line of defence of the city, and on September 15, it attacked the advancing Wehrmacht in Kortumowa Gora and Holosko. Polish attack, in which bayonets were used, halted the Germans, which had to call for artillery support. On September 18, in order to create a link with 10th Motorized Cavalry Brigade, the 35th I.D. attacked along the line Holosko – Brzuchowice. The attack began in the afternoon, and by evening, Polish forces captured complex of a sanatorium along the road to Brzuchowice. Meanwhile, however, 10th Motorized Cavalry Brigade was ordered to break through to Hungary.

On September 19, Polish defenders of Lwów found out about forces of General Kazimierz Sosnkowski, which tried to break into the city from forests in the area of Jaworów. General Władysław Langner immediately ordered the 35th I.D. to attack German positions near Zamarstynow and Holosko. After initial success, Poles were repelled by German tanks, and failed to aid General Sosnkowski. The 35th I.D., which had used up all its ammunition, capitulated in forests near Brzuchowice. Its commandant, Colonel Jarosław Szafran, was later captured by the Soviets, and murdered in Katyn massacre. Furthermore, the NKVD murdered the following officers of the division:

- Colonel Lucjan Janiszewski, who commanded divisional infantry,
- Colonel Piotr Parfianowicz of 205th Infantry Regiment,
- Colonel Edward Koscinski of 206th Infantry Regiment,
- Colonel Wladyslaw Jozef Mikolajczyk of 207th Infantry Regiment,
- Colonel Wladyslaw Aleksander Suryn of 33th Light Artillery Regiment
- Major Doctor Jan Wincenty Krolikiewicz of Sanitary Company,
- Major Erwin Ludwik Herman Bordolo of Field Court Nr. 33.

In August 2026 research work started to prepare the exhuming and further reburying the remains of the division's soldiers who died in battle in Holosko and had been buried in a mass grave in the village cemetery. This work was carried out with the help of employees of the Institute of National Remembrance of Poland and the Wrocław Medical University.

== Sources ==
- Tadeusz Jaruga: Wojsko Polskie : krótki informator historyczny o Wojsku Polskim w latach II wojny światowej. 7, Regularne jednostki Wojska Polskiego w 1939 : organizacja, działania bojowe, uzbrojenie, metryki związków operacyjnych, dywizji i brygad. Warszawa : Wydawnictwo Ministerstwa Obrony Narodowej 1975.
- Jerzy Prochwicz, Korpus Ochrony Pogranicza w przededniu wojny, Część II. Przemiany organizacyjne i przygotowania wojenne KOP w 1939 roku, Wojskowy Przegląd Historyczny Nr 4 (150) z 1994 r., s. 3–13,
- Ryszard Dalecki: Armia „Karpaty" w wojnie obronnej 1939 r., Rzeszów 1989, wyd. II, ISBN 83-03-02830-8

== See also ==
- Operational Group
- Polish army order of battle in 1939
- Fall Weiss
