= Nina Virchenko =

Ukrainian mathematician

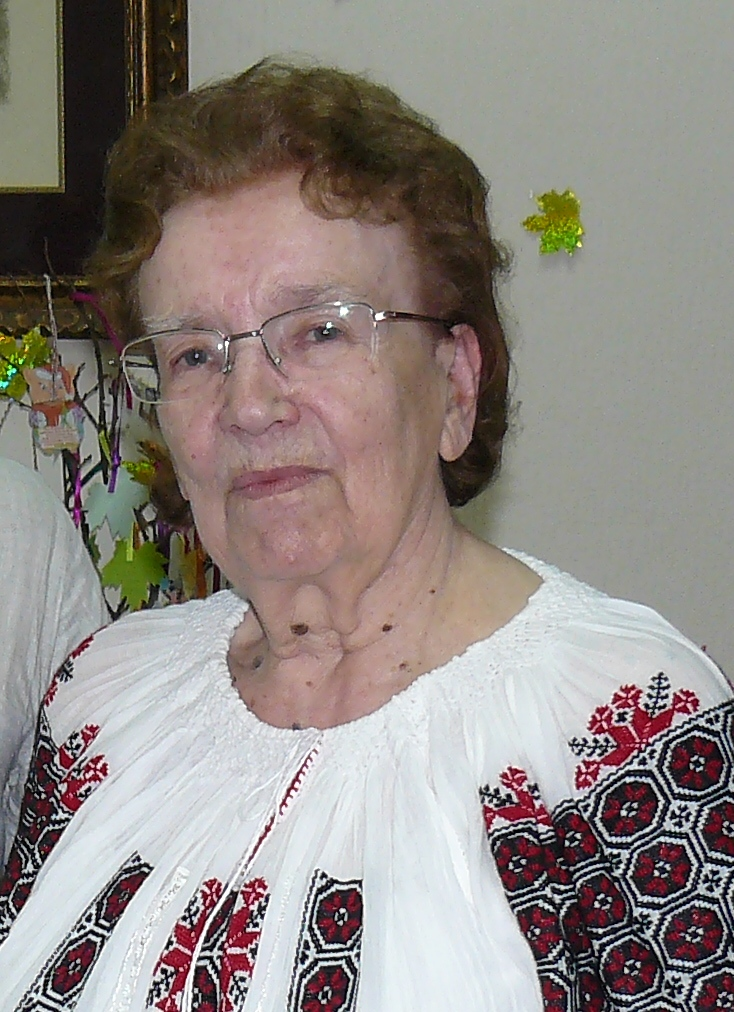
- Nina Virchenko, Ukrainian Independence Day, 2014
- Born: 5 May 1930 (age 96); Zavadivka, Ukraine
- Education: Taras Shevchenko National University of Kyiv
- Known for: Work on integral equations and generalised functions; Books on mathematical methods and history; Former political prisoner; Research on political prisoners
- Spouse: Rostyslav Dotsenko
- Scientific career
- Fields: Mathematics
- Workplaces: Taras Shevchenko National University of Kyiv; National Technical University of Ukraine "KPI"

Nina Opanasivna Virchenko (Ukrainian: Ніна Опанасівна Вірченко; born May 5, 1930) is a Ukrainian mathematician, academic, author, and member of the Ukrainian resistance movement. While a student in Kyiv in 1948, she was arrested on charges of Ukrainian nationalism, and was a political prisoner in a gulag in Eastern Siberia for six years.

On her return to Kyiv, she was able to return to university in 1956, going on to graduate school in 1961. She went on to study mathematics and become a professor of mathematics at Kyiv Polytechnic Institute. Virchenko was finally awarded her PhD in 1988, with a dissertation on integral equations. As well as mathematical studies, she has published on the history of mathematics and repressed mathematicians in Ukraine, as well as books for the general public.

== Early life and education ==
Nina Virchenko was born on May 5, 1930, in Zavadivka, a village in Ukraine. Her mother was a midwife and her father was a former officer of the Ukrainian People's Army. In 1937, the family moved to Chervone. Virchenko attended Zhytomyr School No. 36. When she was a teenager, she gave herself the pseudonym Ужма (UZHMA), which was an acronym for Ukrainian—Woman—Mathematician—Astronomer. In 1947 at age 16, she passed the entrance examination to Moscow University, but enrolled to study mathematics at the National University of Kyiv (KSU) as her parents did not want her to move so far away. She joined a rocket and aerodynamics group, doing multiple parachute jumps.

Virchenko also became involved in the movement for Ukrainian independence from the Soviet Union, writing and distributing leaflets, which led to her imprisonment in a gulag for political prisoners from December 1948 to January 1954. When she was released, she was not allowed to return to university, and taught mathematics in village high schools. Virchenko was able to return to university in Kyiv in 1956, entering KSU's graduate school in 1961.

== Imprisonment and advocacy for political prisoners ==
Virchenko was denounced to the Soviet secret police, NKVD, and was arrested in June 1948 with a group of teachers and other students. She was imprisoned in Lukyanivska Prison. In December, she was sentenced to 10 years' prison on political charges, and sent to the Ozerlag gulag for political prisoners in Tayshet, Eastern Siberia. Virchenko's forced labour included logging and working in a stone quarry. Conditions and treatment in the gulag were brutal. Prisoners were given numbers, and names were not used: hers was R-840. There was no radio and no newspapers, and prisoners had no writing paper. Virchenko created poetry, which was shared orally among the prisoners, and she also taught mathematics, drawing in sand or snow with a stick. She was released after six years because she had been convicted as a minor. She and her husband, who was also a former Gulag detainee, were subjected to KGB surveillance in a later wave of repression of Ukrainian academics.

Virchenko continued to support fellow prisoners, and were outspoken advocates on rights and the freedom and welfare of political prisoners. Virchenko was the Chair of the scientific and methodological council of the All-Ukrainian Association for Political Prisoners and Victims of Repression. In 2016, Virchenko was one of over 80 former Soviet political prisoners who co-signed an appeal to the Dutch public to vote in favour of the European Union-Ukraine Association Agreement.

Virchenko had been interested in the work of Ukrainian mathematician Mikhail Kravchuk for some time. When she learned that he had died in a gulag, she began studying his life and mathematical legacy. She wrote a book about him, organized a series of international mathematical meetings in his honor from 1992, the 100th anniversary of his birth, and advocated for a monument in his honor. Virchenko was also the scientific advisor for a documentary Oleksandr Riabokrys, called "Голгофа академіка Кравчука" (Academic Kravchuk Calvary). Riabokrys also filmed a short documentary about Virchenko, titled ужма (UZMA).

== Academic career ==
In 1965, Virchenko became an assistant professor in mathematics at KSU. From 1974 to 1990, she was an assistant professor of mathematics at then National Technical University of Ukraine (now called Igor Sikorsky Kyiv Polytechnic Institute), promoted to professor in 1990. She was awarded a PhD in 1988, for her dissertation, Dual (Triple) Integral Equations (in Russian). Virchenko's studies included special functions, integral equations, and partial differential equations.

As well as over 350 scientific publications in mathematics, Virchenko has published articles and books on the history of mathematics, including for the general public. This includes a book on mathematical aphorisms and quotes, published in three languages. Virchenko also published a memoir in 2011.

She has received several awards and honours, including the Yaroslav the Wise Award from the Academy of Sciences of Ukraine (1999), medal "Building of Ukraine" (2001), Medal of Andrew the First-Called (2005), badge from the Ministry of Education and Science "Petro Mohyla" (2007), and Honored Worker of Education of Ukraine (2006).

== Personal life ==
Virchenko married writer and translator Rostyslav Dotsenko (19 April 1931 – 24 October 2012) in 1964. Dotsenko was also a former political prisoner. They had two children.
