= Iryna Senyk =

Ukrainian activist

- Іри́на Миха́йлівна Се́ник
- Born: Iryna Mykhailivna Senyk; June 8, 1926; Lviv, Ukraine
- Died: October 25, 2009 (aged 83); Boryslav, Ukraine
- Resting place: Lychakivske Cemetery, Lviv
- Education: University of Lviv
- Occupations: poet; nurse; political dissident

Iryna Senyk (Ukrainian, Іри́на Миха́йлівна Се́ник; June 8, 1926, Lviv - October 25, 2009, Boryslav) was a Ukrainian poet, nurse, and Soviet political dissident. She was imprisoned in Stalinist camps as were her mother and brother. She was a member of the Ukrainian Helsinki Group and an honorary member of PEN International.

== Biography ==
Iryna Mykhailivna Senyk was born on June 8, 1926, in Lviv. Her parents were Mykhailo Senyk and Maria Senyk.

From 1939, she was a member of the Youth of the Organization of Ukrainian Nationalists (OUN), and in 1941, she became a full member of the organization, working in the regional propaganda department. She studied at a folk school and a private girls' gymnasium before entering University of Lviv in 1944.

In December 1945, while a student at the University of Lviv, she was arrested on charges of "treason against the homeland" (Article 54-1 "a") and "involvement in a counter-revolutionary organization" (Article 54–11) of the Criminal Code, and imprisoned on Lontsky Street. She was sentenced in 1946 to ten years in concentration camps in Siberia (Ozerlag, Angarlag, and Irkutsk Oblast) and life in exile on charges of links with the Ukrainian Insurgent Army. Despite all the camp bans, she continued writing poetry, which she had been doing since the age of nine, secretly writing on scraps of paper. While in camp, she learned how to embroider pieces on religious themes. She left the camp in 1956, with the second disability group, exiled in the Siberian Anzhero-Sudzhensk, Kemerovo region; the term of the exile expired in 1968.

"I secretly composed my grief-stricken lines in my head, and in the morning I would recite them to my cellmates.... How was I to thank all those who saved my life, who gave me the gift of kind words every day? I gave them my poetic lines." -Iryna Senyk

After the exile, Senyk arrived in Ivano-Frankivsk as the return to Lviv was not possible. For a short time, she worked as a nurse with prisoners in a tuberculosis hospital. She became acquainted with Viacheslav Chornovil, Valentin Moroz and other activists of the resistance movement against Russification and national discrimination of the Ukrainian people - the Shestydesyatnyky ("Sixties activists"). She also helped to spread samizdat. In December 1969, she signed the statement of 16 former political prisoners "Again chamber affairs?" addressed to the Chairman of the Presidium of the Supreme Soviet of the Ukrainian Soviet Socialist Republic, which was directed against the practice of conviction in prison. The statement was published in the Ukrainian Herald No. 1 in 1970 and broadcast on Radio Liberty.

In 1972, Senyk, a nurse, was arrested and sentenced to six years in prison camp and five years in exile, with an expected release date of November 17, 1983. While serving her sentence in a Mordovian camp, repressed for her beliefs, she became an invalid, her arm broken during an accident at a rock quarry. In 1979, now in exile, she was a signatory to the "Members of the Ukrainian Public Group to Promote the Implementation of the Helsinki Accords", dated October 6, 1979. Since 1979, she was a member of the Ukrainian Helsinki Group. She was also an honorary member of PEN International. Senyk was a signatory of the 1987 Ukrainian Association of Independent Creative Intelligentsia (UANTI) declaration.

== Awards ==
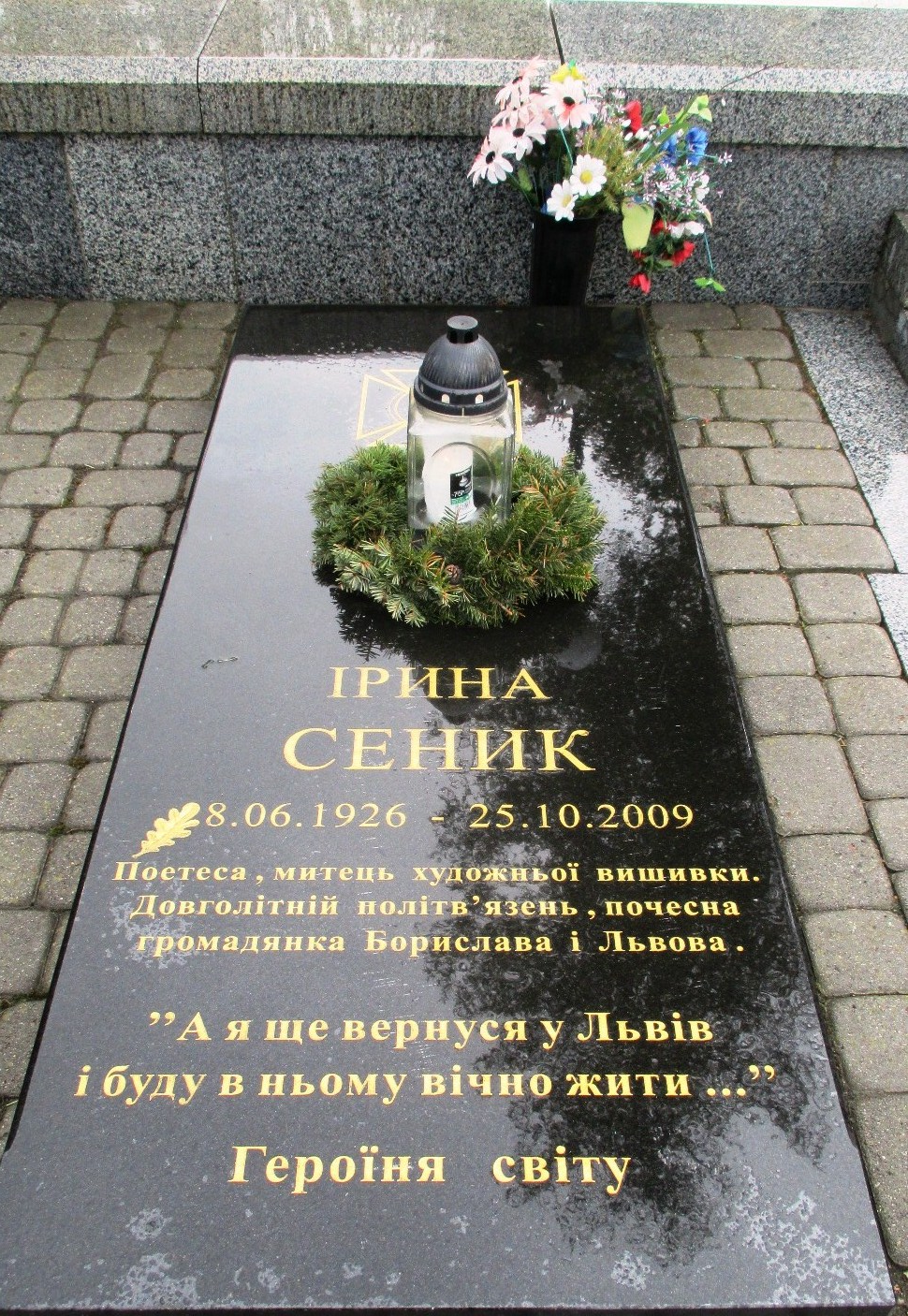
Iryna Senyk

- 2005, Order of Princess Olha, 3rd order
- 2006, Award For Courage, 1st order

== Selected works ==
- Suviĭ polotna : poeziï, 1990
- White aster of love : collection of poetry embroidery and contemporary dress designs, 1992 (in English and Ukrainian)
- Bila aĭstra li︠u︡bovy : zbirka virshiv, vyshyvok ta zrazkiv suchasnoho odi︠a︡hu, 1992
- Zahratovana i︠u︡nist ́ : poeziï, 1996
- Slavni dochky Ukraïny-Rusi, 1999
- V nas odna Ukraïna, 1999
- Knyz͡hechka Babusi Iryny dli͡a chemnöi dytyny (Babusia Iryna's little book : won't you come and have a look)
