= Rostyslav Dotsenko =

Ukrainian translator, literary critic and author

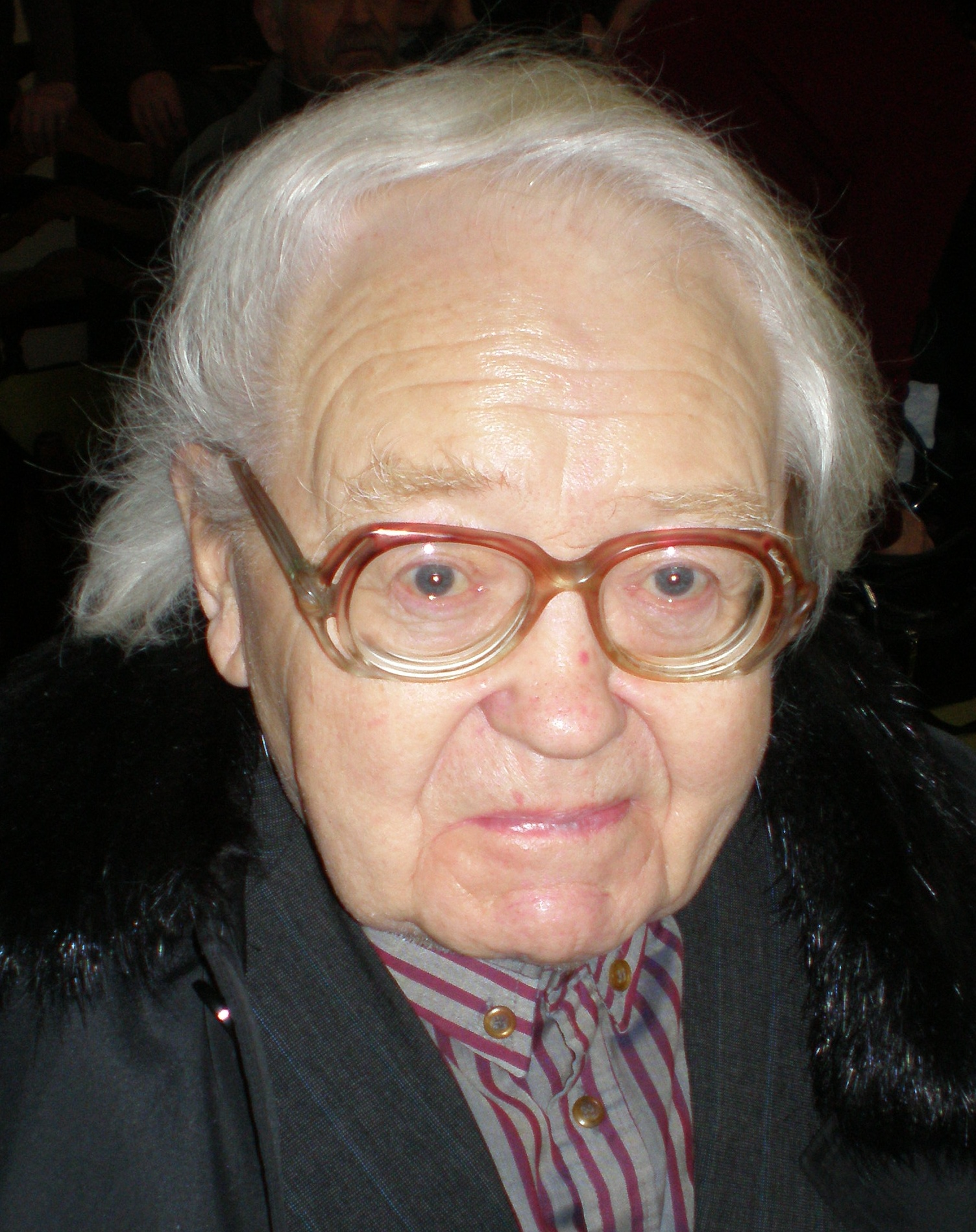
Dotsenko in 2011

Rostyslav Dotsenko (19 April 1931 in Kyiv – 24 October 2012 in Kyiv) was a Ukrainian translator, literary critic, and author of aphorisms and maxims. He was a member of the National Writers Union of Ukraine and a political prisoner of Stalin's concentration camps for 10 years.

== Biography ==
Rostyslav Dotsenko was born in Kyiv 1931. After graduating Kiev school No. 92 entered Kiev Taras Shevchenko National University on the department of Ukrainian Philology.

On 14 February 1953 he was arrested on charges of "Ukrainian bourgeois nationalism." In May of the same year, he was judged with fellow students Hryhoriy Voloschuk and Mykola Adamenko. According to the Article 54 part 10 and part 11 of the second part of Ukrainian SSR Criminal Code, he was sentenced to 8 years of corrective labour camps with confiscation of property.

From 1953 to 1956 Rostyslav Dotsenko was serving his sentence in Volga concentration camps involved in hydroelectric construction. In the spring of 1955, a dozen of political prisoners were convicted of youthful non-conformism and organized oppositional to ruling Soviet elites as "Group of revolutionary Marxists" Rostyslav Dotsenko was one of the active members of this group as he is the co-author of the program and statutory documents of the group. Communist Party interpreted these documents as "reactionary party of fascistic type" due to the GRM provocateur, the group was discovered in April 1956. In April 1956, its members (A. Sukhodolskyi, R. Dotsenko, J. Mazur, D. Pysarev, D. Slobodyan, V. Cherepanov, A. Stasishkis, A. Myroshnichenko, A. Ahbalov and others) were arrested and trialled in September of the same year. Rostyslav Dotsenko under the Articles 58–10, 58–11 RSFSR Criminal Code got another 7 years of imprisonment. The new sentence started in October 1956 and until May 1957 Rostyslav Dotsenko served in Khabarovsk; then from June 1957 to April 1960 in Irkutsk and from April 1960 to April 1963 in Mordovia.

In the concentration camps Dotsenko had met the leading figures of Ukrainian national liberation movement – Patriarch Josyf Slipyj, many of former UPA soldiers, members of the Lithuanian resistance movement, as well as many scientists, philosophers, artists and other members of intelligentsia . Rostyslav Dotsenko refers to those times as "From Mordovian cannabis, unexpectedly I entered the Sixtiers and politics in the Soviet Union in the second half of 1950) where gladly acquainted with Ivan Svitlychny Dziuba, Lina Kostenko, Alla Horska and many, many others outstanding personalities of those revival years." Then he made more than 30 translations from English, French, Polish, particularly the works of Oscar Wilde, James Fenimore Cooper, William Faulkner, Charles Dickens, Margaret Mitchell, J. Luckyj, Arthur Conan Doyle, Robert Louis Stevenson, Jonathan Swift and some others. Dotsenko is also an author of "Thoughts for the night". Rostyslav Dotsenko was the originator of books by L. Hrebinka, L. Lyman, J. Litvin.

He was married to Professor Nina Virchenko.

In the early 1970s, the "Dnipro" publishing house gathered a group of writers led by Ivan Dziuba, who worked with Mykola Lukash and Hryhoriy Kochur – recent prisoners of the Soviet concentration camps. Rostyslav Dotsenko was threatened with arrest again. After refusing to cooperate with the KGB he was fired from his job in publishing house and forbidden to publish. After Ukraine release from Soviet occupation, Dotsenko focused on studying of killed by communists' authors. At the same time he ordered the publication of works by Leonid Hrebinka, popularized in periodicals works by O.Teliha, O.Kurinnyi, О.Hryhorenko]], A.E. Jaworowskiy, H.Mazurenko, P. Karpenko-Krynytsya, A. Tarnavskyi, L.Lyman.

Dotsenko is the author of the book "On Lightning's edges" about poet, human rights activist and his personal friend Yuriy Lytvyn. Rostyslav is Laureate of awards named after Rylskyi and Lukash.

== Literature, criticism, journalism, aphorisms ==
- Overview of the Ukrainian Shakespeares. [Review]. / / Vsesvit (Universe)., 1965. Number 8. P. 113–15.
- New Ukrainian "Hamlet." [Review of H. Kochur's translation] / / Vsesvit (Universe)., 1965. Number 9. P. 158–60.
- Language speed and slowness of dictionaries/ / Batkivshchyna (Fatherland). 1966. Number 12. P. 161–165.
- Poet of human courage. [About Jack London] / / J. London Martin Eden. K.: Molod' (Youth).1968. P.333-342.
- Translation and daily press. / / Literatyrna Ukraina (Literary Ukraine). 1968, 06.08.
- Chores of school library. / / Batkivshchyna (Fatherland)., 1969. Number 4. P. 210–211.
- Hemingway – who we have and not have. / / Batkivshchyna (Fatherland) ., 1971. Number 6. P. 157–164.
- Faulkner: the approaches to writer's style. / / Vsesvit (Universe)., 1971. Number 9. P. 114–117.
- Something about the style of Faulkner / / Faulkner W. hijackers and other works. K. Dnipro., 1972. P 489–505.
- Ukrainian Indologist. [About Paul Ritter]. / / Batkivshchyna (Fatherland)., 1972. Number 5. P 216–217.
- New English-Ukrainian dictionary. [Review] / / Literatyrna Ukraina (Literary Ukraine). 1974, 13.12.
- A valuable dictionary [Review of the Dictionary of foreign words] / / Batkivshchyna (Fatherland), 1976. Number 9. P. 208–210.
- Open in a second time. [About "Hamlet" translated by L. Hrebinka] / / Batkivshchyna (Fatherland), 1976. Number 4. P 214–216.
- Journey to the Emerald Isle. / / Owner of the house: the story of Irish writers. K. Veselka (Rainbow)., 1981. P 159–166.
- Faulkner About the past that stands in the way of the future / / B. Faulkner home. Novel in Short Stories. Translation V. Kornienko, P. Dotsenko. K.: Molod’ (Youth)., 1983. P. 3–16.
- Because the heroes are primarily people ... [Review] / / Fatherland (Batkivshchyna)., 1985. Number 2. P. 201–203.
- The magical world of Irish tales / / Tales of the Emerald Island: Irish folk tales. K., Veselka (Rainbov)., 1987. P. 5–10.
- On the evening of life, and at dawn of hope. Interview with Hryhoriy Kochur / / Ukraine. 1989, 23.04. No. 17 (1681). P. 0-3
- Fulfilled and unfulfilled duty [Review on the book. of the Agatangel Krymskyi] / / Batkivshchyna (Fatherland)., 1981. Number 9. P 207–211.
- Under the insatiable censorship eye. / / Ukraine. 1989, 10.12. No. 50 (1714). P. 20–22.
- Do not forget your duty. [To 70th Lukash's anniversary] / / Ukrainian language and literature at school., 1989. Number 12. P. 5–7.
- Poet, going through the night. [About P. Karpenko-Krynytsya] / / Zhyva Voda (Live Water)., 1992. Number 11.P . 6.
- The word that boils with love. [About Martha Tarnavska] / / Literatyrna Ukraina (Literary Ukraine). 1992 13.08. No. 32 (4493).
- Translation – for self-enrichment or self-stealing? / / Starovyna (Antiquity)., 1993. No. 1 (37). P. 10–13.
- Free Thought of epistolary boxes. [ Nytchenko] / / Sychasnist' (Modernity)., 1999. Number 6. P. 162–167.
- For Ukraine he was tortured .... [About L. Hrebinka] / / Nowi Dni (New days). 1995, July. Number 544. P.13-17.
- Who is hidden under O.T.? / / Literatyrna Ukraina (Literary Ukraine). 1997, 09.01. p. 7
- Returning of Galya Masurenko / / Kyiv., 1997. No. 5–6. P 58–61.
- Far-Eastern string of Ukrainian lira. [About H. Turko] / / Zhyva Voda (Live Water). 1997, August. No. 8 (72).
- About English Ukrainistiks – and beyond. [Bibliographic works of Tarnavska] / / Vsesvit (Universe)., 1998. Number 1. P. 171–175.
- Halya Masurenko who will come to us / / Zhyva Voda (Live Water). 2000, August. No. 8 (108). P. 6
- Poetry on the soul distance. [About L. Lyman] / / Suchasnist' (Modernity). 2,000. No. 7–8. P. 54–7.
- Farewell and hope. [From memories of Halya Masurenko] / / Literatyrna Ukraina (Literary Ukraine) . 2000, 09.11. Number 25/26. P. 7.
- Yuriy Victorious of Ukrainian poetry. [About Y.Lupa] / / Zhyva Voda (Live Water). 2001, February. Number 2 (114). P. 2.
- Ukrainian hundred years old antiquity. By portrait O.Konyskyi / / Ukrainian language and literature at school 2001. P. 8–13.
- Letters from captivity (1953–1963). Letter to Belorus] / / He just goes ... Collection to anniversary of Rostislav Dotsenko. K.: Zadruga., 2001. P. 132–269.
- Crossroads of translated and experienced. / / Oksana Solovey. Translations. Edited by D. Cherednychenko. Foreword by R. Dotsenko. K. Zadruga., 2001. P. 3–6.
- Luxury and poverty of Ukrainian Encyclopedia. [Article-review] / / Ukrainskyi pohliad (Ukraine Sight)., 2001. No. 1–2. P. 169–176.
- Mykola Adamenko / / Moloda Ukraina (Young Ukraine). 2002, 24.01. Number 8 (18271). P. 4.
- Leonid Lyman near and far. [ Preface ] / / Lyman L. Memory (poetry and prose). Compiler, editor and author of notes Rostislav Dotsenko. K. Zadruga ., 2002. P. 5-18
- Argonaut who bypassed Gulag. (About L. Maloshychenko-Chernov ). Dyvoslovo (Dialogist)., 2002. Number 11.
- Debut – first and farewell. [About V. Yurchenko] / / Literatyrna Ukraina (Literary Ukraine). 2003 12.06. P. 5
- Singing poetry and prose of Kupchinsky. / / Berezil., 2003. No. 11–12. P. 170–177.
- Slovoskyp Martha Tarnavska. / / Tarnavska M. Pulsary., 2004. P. 252–265.
- The life of designer, decorating the world (Leonid Lyman – 1922–2003) / / Svoboda Slova (Liberty)., 2004. 20.08. Number 34. P. 23–24.
- Poetry of life and death. [About Herasim Sokolenko] / / / Kyiv., 2005. Number 12. P.75-83.
- Poltava "izarets." [About O. Izarskoho – O. Malchenko] / / Literatyrna Ukraina (Literary Ukraine). No. 32 (5220). 23 August 2007. P. 7.
- Rostyslav Dotsenko. Yuriy Lytvyn – poet during prison walls of era .. ( Memoirs and reflections ). The serie "Calvary of millions". " By order of the Kiev Society of political prisoners and victims of repression. Editor G. Gaovyi . Ukrainian Center of culture. K. 2007. 30 pages .
- Farewell before the future meetings. Obituary A. Izarskoho / / Nashe Zhyttia (Our Live). New York, 2007. Number 11. P. 9-10, 28.
- "On Ukraine I will return ..." [About L. Drazhevska] / / Berezil., 2007. No. 7–8. P. 159–172.
- Inevitability of strict flow of life. [About O. Smotrych] / / Kyrier Kryvbasu (Courier of Kryvbas)., 2008. No. 5–6. P.313-321
- Overseas view on Ukrainian identity. [About Vadym Lesych] / / Chudovyi Svit (Wonderful World)., 2008. Number 1. P. 24–26.
- Hamsun, hunger and collaboration / / Euro-Atlantic., 2009. Number 2. P. 58–62.
- Shakespeare's Hamlet in "the Ems" Kyiv 1882 / / Kyiv., 2010. No. 4–5. P. 174–184.
- Far Eastern lyricist Ukrainian spirituality. [About G.Tyrkova] / / Dzvin (Bell)., 2011. Number 2. P. 145–146.
- Rostyslav Dotsenko. Bright ideas for the night. Aphorisms and something close to it. Ternopil: Educational book – Bogdan., 2011. 296 pp.
- Roads of Leonid Lyman / / Literatyrna Ukraina (Literary Ukraine)., 2012. 2.08. No. 29 (5458). P. 15.

== Basic translations ==
- Evan Hunter. School jungle. Novel. Translated from English in collaboration with V. MAKSYMCHUK. / / Vsesvit (Universe)., 1967. Number 1.
- Oscar Wilde. The Picture of Dorian Gray. Novel. Trans. from English. Afterword by R. Dotsenko. Kyiv: Dnipro., 1968.
- Fenimore Cooper. Last of the Mohicans. Novel .Transl. from English. K.: Veselka (Rainbow)., 1969.
- William Faulkner. Thieves. Novel. / / W. Faulkner. Theft and other works. Foreword of Denysova T., R. Dotsenko's afterword. Kyiv: Dnipro., 1972.
- Mark Twain. Famous frog jumper from Kalaverasu . The murder of Julius Caesar. Science against talent. A lovely old man . Italian guides. Stories and pamphlets. / / Mark Twain. Stories and pamphlets. Kyiv: Dnipro., 1972.
- William Faulkner. Bear. Red leaves. Rose for Emily. Arid September. Ellie. Justice. Arson. Courtship. Uncle Willie. Stories and novels. / / W. Faulkner. Red leaves. Novels. Kyiv: Dnipro., 1978.
- Brian Friel. Honorary citizens. Play.Transl. from English. / / Vsesvit (Universe)., 1978. Number 5.
- English proverbs and sayings. Collection. Translated from English. R. Dotsenko. Preface N. Zhluktenko. Kyiv: Dnipro., 1980.
- The owner of the house. The story of Irish writers. Collection. Compilation, afterword, biographies and translated from the English. Dotsenko. K.: Veselka (Rainbow). 1981
- Ray Bradbury. Rust. Talking at a reduced rate. Stories. Transl. from English. / / Adventure, travel, science fiction. Collection of short stories, essays, K.: Molod’ (Youth)., 1983. P. 202–218.
- V.S. Naipol Migel Street. Novel. Transl. from English. / / Vsesvit (Universe)., 1983. Number 2.
- Margaret Mitchell. Gone with the Wind. Novel. Books 1 and 2. Kyiv: Dnipro., 1992.
- Lem Stanislaw. Uranium ears. Stories from the "Tales of" robots. Stories from " Keberiada." / / Kyiv: Dnipro., 1990.
- Frank O'Connor. Guests from Ireland. Novels. (Content: Visitors from Ireland. Alec. Patriarch. The train. Grandeur of law. Miser. Christmas morning. First confession. Apostate. Drunkard. My Oedipus Complex. Idealist. A man with character. Private property. Wife-American. Corker Family . Spirits.) Trans. from English. Kyiv: Dnipro., 1984.
- Simak K. Biggie. Story. Transl. from English. / / Adventure, travel, science fiction. Collection of novels, short stories, essays. K.: Molod’(Youth)., 1985. P. 199–238.
- William Faulkner. In his last hour. / / Vsesvit (Universe)., 1986. Number 6.
- Charles Dickens. Great expectations. Novel. K.: Veselka (Rainbow)., 1986.
- Tales of the Emerald Island. Collection of Irish folk tales. Compilation, introduction and translation of the English. R. Dotsenko (collection of 38 stories). K.: Veselka (Rainbow)., 1987.
- RL Stevenson Bed François Villon. House in the dunes. / / RL Stevenson's works in five volumes. Volume 1. Kyiv: Ukrainoznavstvo (Ukrainian studies). 1995
- Luckyj Yuri. Between Gogol and Shevchenko. Transl. from English. K. Tshas (Time) series "Modern Ukrainian literature." 1998.
- Oscar Wilde. The Picture of Dorian Gray. Novels, plays. [Contents: The Picture of Dorian Gray, Lady Windermere Fan, The Importance of Being respectful]. Transl. from English., preface and notes RI Dotsenko. Kharkiv: Folio., 2006.
- Bohenskyy Jacek. Ovid Nazon – poet.Novel. Translated from Polish by R. Dotsenko. Lviv: "Pyramid.", 2011.

== Literature ==
- Pokalchuk Y. faith in man. [Review of the book.: W. Faulkner. Thieves.] / / Vsesvit (Universe)., 1972. Number 10.
- Vynnychuk Y. Guests of Green Island / / Vsesvit (Universe)., 1985. Number 12. P. 134–136.
- Striha M. A new approach to the Dickens / / Vsesvit (Universe)., 1987. Number 7. P. 128–130.
- Kontsevych E. "Generous sprout of mighty roots ..." / / K: Radianskyi pusmennyk (Soviet writer)., 1988.
- Kochur H. Rostislav Dotsenko – 60 / / Literatyrna Ulraina (Literary Ukraine). 6 June 1991.
- Rozhenko M. sixties: the years of repression – the years of protest / / People newspaper., 1995. Veresen’ (September). No. 33 (214). P. 4–5.
- Chorna L. anniversary year events / / Nasha Vira (Our faith)., 1997. April. No. 4 (108). P. 4.
- Shovkun B. From cohort of artists / / Literatyrna Ulraina (Literary Ukraine). 01.07.1999. No. 216 (4842).
- Shuhevich Y. where did you see Nationalists in Ukraine? / / Politics and Culture. 05–11.09.2000. No. 32 (67). P. 4–7.
- Rostislav Dotsenko – Laureate Of Mykola Lukash award / / Literatyrna Ulraina (Literary Ukraine). 08.02.2001. Number 5 (4902). P. 3.
- Bilous A.M. Adamenko M. Kaharlytskyi M., V. Kornienko et al. He just goes ... Collection of the anniversary of Rostislav Dotsenko. K.: Zadruga., 2001.
- Habor V. Dotsenko R.I. / / Ukrainian journalism in names. 2006. P. 132–136.
- Dotsenko R.I. [Biography] / / Resistance Movement in Ukraine: 1960–1990. K.: Smoloskyp (Torch)., 2012. P. 239–240.
- Eternal Memory: Rostislav I. Dotsenko / / Ukrainske Slovo (Ukrainian word). 31.10–06.11.2012. No. 44 (3504).P
- Losses: Rostislav Dotsenko / / Literatyrna Ulraina (Literary Ukraine). 01.11.2012. No. 42 (5471) P. 5. . 4.
- Bright memory about Rostislav Dotsenko / / Slovo prosvity (The word of education). 01–07.11.2012. No. 44 (681). P. 4.
- Rostislav Dotsenko: obituary / / Ukrainian literary newspaper. 03/11/2012. No. 22 (80).
- L. Lukyanenko from the darkness of totalitarianism – to eternity. / / The path of victory. 14 November 2012. No. 46 (3047). P. 6.
- L. Lukyanenko, Tarnavska In memory of Rostislav M. Dotsenko / / Svoboda Slova (Liberty). 23 November 2012. Number 47. P. 17.
