= Ozerlag =

Coordinates: 56.1267°N 99.7731°E

Ozerlag (Озерлаг) was an MVD special camp (osoblag No. 7, osoby lager No. 7) in the Soviet GULAG labor camp system for political prisoners. It was established in 1948 near Tayshet and included a chain of camp sites (lagernye punkty) along the Baikal–Amur Mainline branches constructed by the inmates, up to Bratsk and later further to Ust-Kut.

== Notable detainees ==
- Leo Bauer (1912–1972), German political activist and journalist
- Moisei Beregovsky (1892–1961), Ukrainian Jewish folklorist and ethnomusicologist
- Johannes Grant (1890–?), Estonian military commander
- Jazep Hermanovich (1890–1978), Belarusian Greek Catholic priest and poet
- Oleksander Hrekov (1875–1958), Ukrainian military commander
- Stasys Ignatavičius, Lithuanian engineer, member of anti-Soviet resistance
- Mikhail Kalik (1927–2017), Soviet and Israeli film director and screenwriter
- August Kolk (1902–1997), Estonian military commander
- Ján Košút (1926–2013), Slovak political prisoner
- Victor Krasin (1929–2017), Russian human rights activist and economist
- Yuriy Lytvyn (1934–1984), Ukrainian lyrical and prose writer, journalist and human rights activist
- Hugo Pärtelpoeg (1899–1951), Estonian lawyer and politician
- Algirdas Petrusevičius (born 1937), Lithuanian anti-Soviet dissident
- Viktoras Petkus (1928–2012), Lithuanian political activist
- Hugo Raudsepp (1883–1952), Estonian playwright and politician
- Lidia Ruslanova (1900–1973), Russian folk singer
- Iryna Senyk (1926–2009), Ukrainian poet and nurse
- Dmitry Shebedev (1911–1955), Soviet draughts player
- Adam Stankievič (1882–1949), Belarusian Roman Catholic priest, politician and writer
- Manfred Stern (1896–1954), Soviet spy
- Andrei Tsikota (189–1952), Belarusian Roman Catholic and Greek Catholic priest
- Karl Tuvike (1892–1960), Estonian Lutheran clergyman
- Maya Ulanovskaya (1932–2020), American-born Russian-Israeli writer and translator
- Nina Virchenko (born 1930), Ukrainian mathematician, academic and author
- Hava Volovich (1916–2000), Ukrainian writer, actress, puppet theater director
- Sergey Voytsekhovsky (1883–1951), Imperial Russian, White movement and Czechoslovak military commander
- Ivan Ziatyk (1899–1952), Ukrainian Catholic priest
