= Angarlag =

Gulag labor camp

Angarlag, also Angarstroy, Angarsky ITL (Russian: Ангарлаг, Ангарстрой, Ангарский ИТЛ) was a Gulag labor camp during 1947-1960 headquartered in Bratsk, Irkutsk Oblast, RSFSR. Initially, it was under the control of the Western Directorate of Baikal-Amur Mainline Construction and Camps. In 1948 it was resubordinated to the Chief Directorate of Railroad Construction Camps, later directly to GULAG.

Its major projects were the construction of segments of Baikal-Amur Mainline and a bridge across Angara.

In 1948 the Taishetlag was merged into Angarlag. Later some other divisions and enterprises were transferred to Angarlag.

== Notable inmates ==
- Iryna Senyk (1926-2009), Ukrainian poet, nurse, and Soviet political dissident
- Karl Rägo (1989-1955), Soviet Estonian military officer
