= Holosko =

Coordinates: 49°51′N 24°01′E

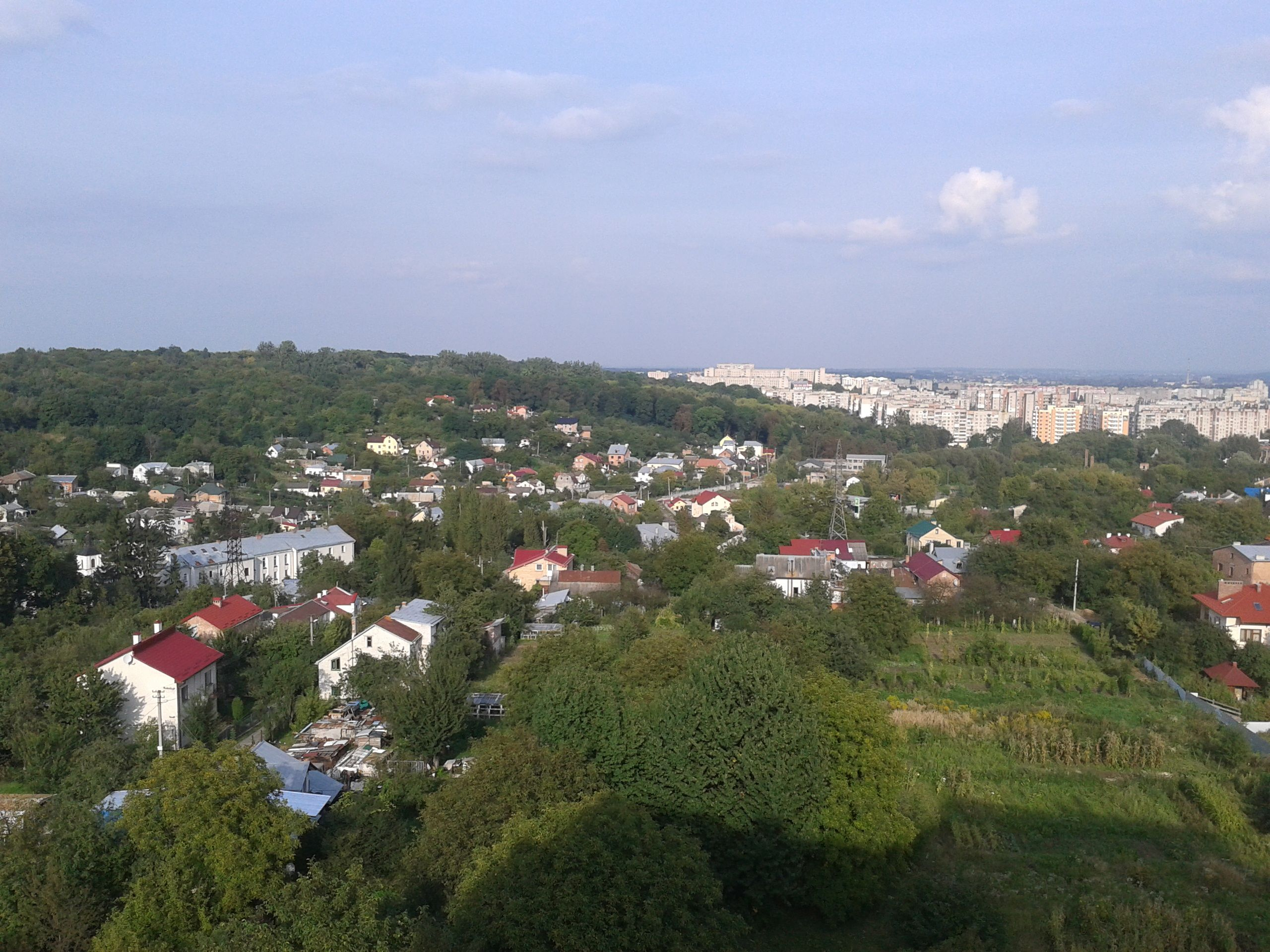
A skyline of Holosko

Holosko is a residential area of Lviv, Ukraine located to the north of Varshavska (Warsaw) Street, on the site of former suburban villages of Holosko Velyke (Ukrainian: Голоско Велике, Polish: Hołosko Wielkie) and Holosko Male (Ukrainian: Голоско Мале). Before the Nazi German and Soviet invasions of Poland in September 1939, the area belonged to Lwów Voivodeship in eastern Poland.

== Name ==
According to some scientists, the name of Holosko could derive from Holovsko, the historical capital of Antes people, which was located on Lviv's Castle Hill. According to another theory, the toponym is of Turkic origin and is connected to numerous lakes in the area of Poltva river.

== History ==
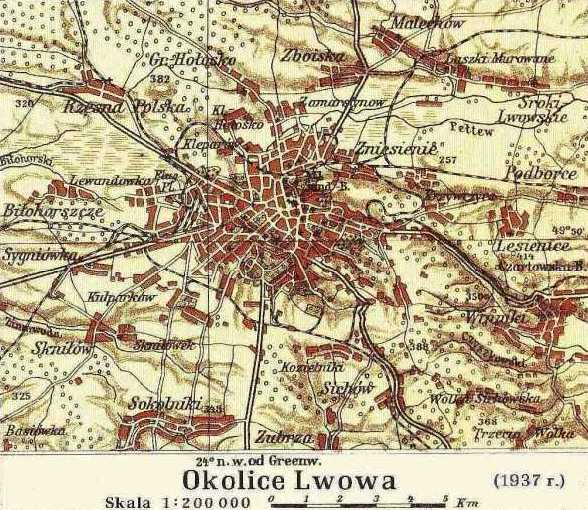
Lwów and its surroundings before 1937

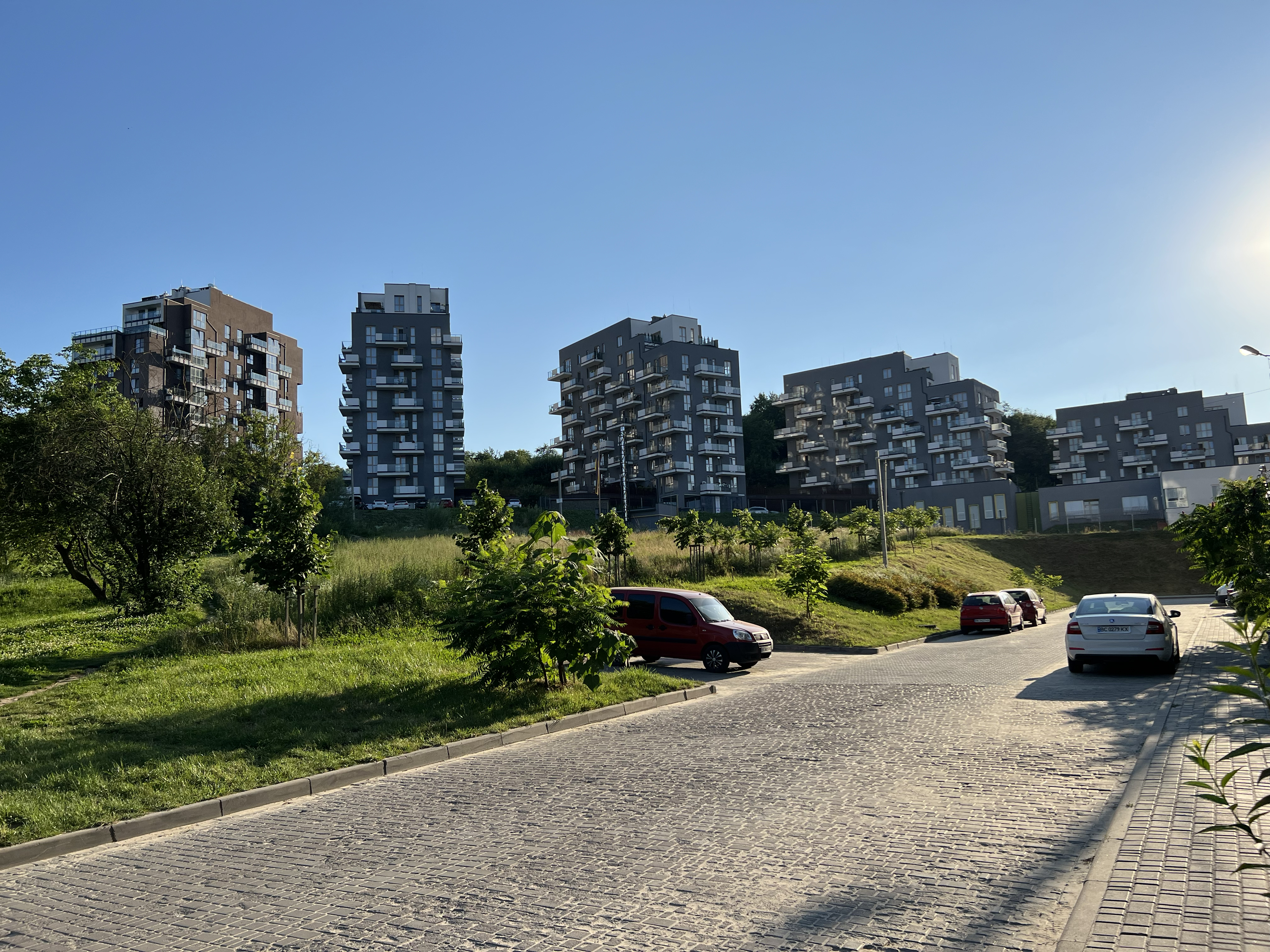
A modern residential area in Holosko

The area is first mentioned in documents from 1401 under the name of Holovsko. It was founded by burgher Mikola Zimmermann. In 1415 the settlement was acquired by the city of Lviv and changed its name to Holosko Velyke (Greater Holosko). A nearby settlement founded by burgher Jan Hanel became known as Holosko Male (Little Holosko).

The church of Intercession of the Theotokos in Holosko was first mentioned in 1539 and belonged to Lviv's Saint Georges Cathedral, but didn't survive to our times. Trade fairs were taking place in front of the church starting from 1701.

The Baroque Church of Assumption of St. Anne was constructed in Velyke Holosko in 1775.

Large sandy grounds, which used to be located in the area, were forested by Lviv's authorities in the early 19th century.

In 1910 a tuberculosis sanatorium opened in a forest in Roztochchia hills near Holosko.

In 1923 a Redemptorist monastery was established Velyke Holosko by Belgian monks with the support of metropolitan Andrey Sheptytsky.

In 1930 Male Holosko became an administrative part of Lviv.

Holosko Velyke was a site of a fierce defence by the Polish 35th Infantry Division - Reserve (35 Dywizja Piechoty - Rezerwowa) on September 15–16, 1939, against the invading German forces during the Battle of Lwów. Soldiers of the Polish Army who died the battle were buried in a mass grave in the village cemetery.

Velyke Holosko was administratively subjected to Lviv under German occupation in 1942-1944 as part of Zamarstyniv district. After the war it became part of Briukhovychi District, and was finally attached to Lviv in 1958.

In 2008 the last artillery shells were removed from an ammunition depot, which had been functioning in a forest area near Holosko since the late 19th century.

In August 2026 research work started to prepare the exhuming and further reburying the remains of the Polish soldiers who died in the September 1939 battle. This work was carried out with the help of employees of the Institute of National Remembrance of Poland and the Wrocław Medical University.

== Bibliography ==
- (in Polish) Tadeusz Jaruga: Wojsko Polskie : krótki informator historyczny o Wojsku Polskim w latach II wojny światowej. 7, Regularne jednostki Wojska Polskiego w 1939 : organizacja, działania bojowe, uzbrojenie, metryki związków operacyjnych, dywizji i brygad. Warszawa : Wydawnictwo Ministerstwa Obrony Narodowej 1975.
- (in Polish) Jerzy Prochwicz, Korpus Ochrony Pogranicza w przededniu wojny, Część II. Przemiany organizacyjne i przygotowania wojenne KOP w 1939 roku, Wojskowy Przegląd Historyczny Nr 4 (150) z 1994 r., s. 3-13,
- (in Polish) Ryszard Dalecki: Armia „Karpaty” w wojnie obronnej 1939 r., Rzeszów 1989, wyd. II, ISBN 83-03-02830-8
- Stepan Makarczuk, “Straty ludności w Galicji Wschodniej w latach II wojny światowej (1939–1945),” in Polska–Ukraina: Trudne pytania, vol. 6 (Warsaw: Światowy Związek Żołnierzy Armii Krajowej, Związek Ukraińców w Polsce, and Karta, 2000), p.240
