= Tayshet =

Town in Irkutsk Oblast, Russia

Tayshet Тайшет
- Town
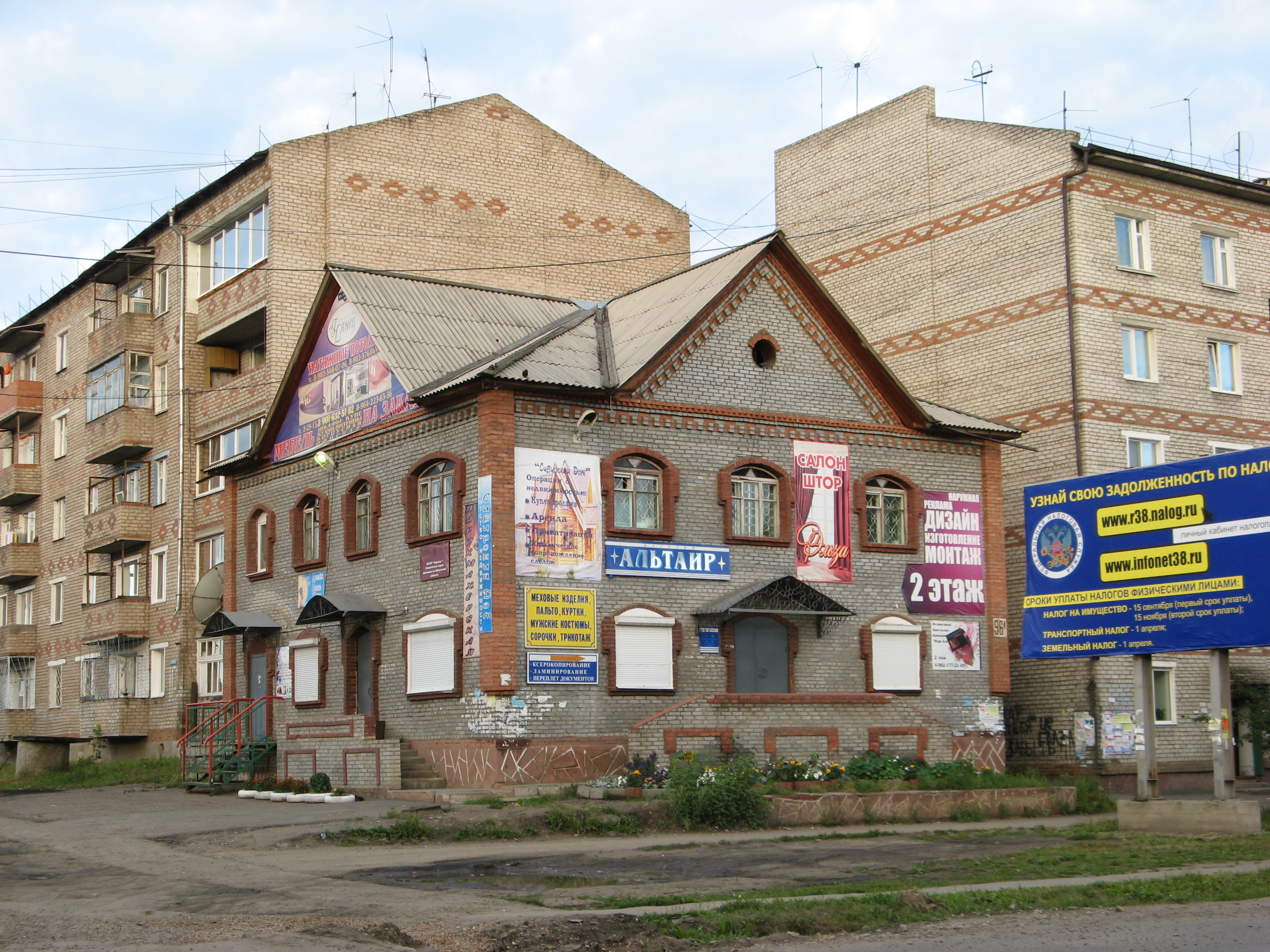
- Tayshet

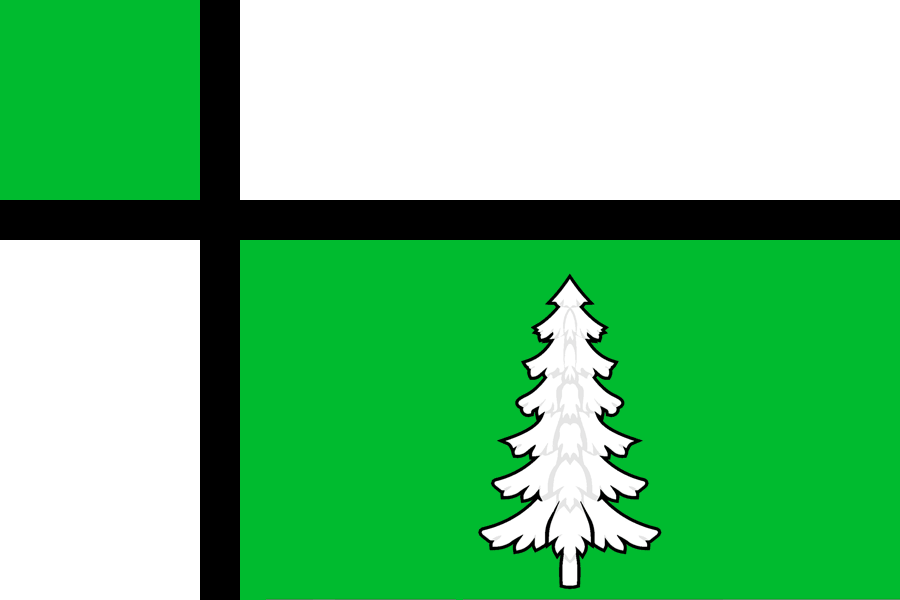
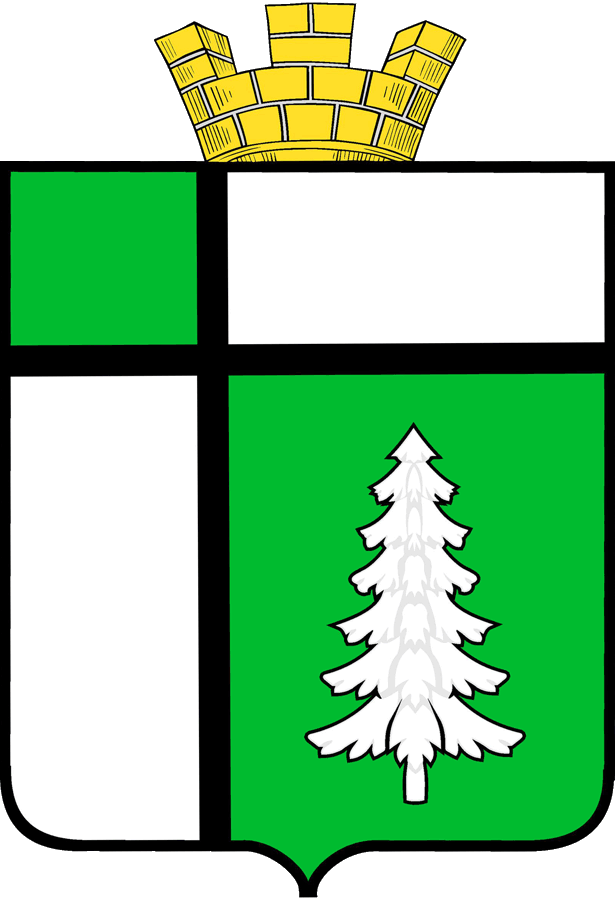
- Flag Coat of arms
- Interactive map of Tayshet
- Location of Tayshet Tayshet (Irkutsk Oblast)
- Coordinates: 55°57′N 98°01′E
- Country: Russia
- Federal subject: Irkutsk Oblast
- Administrative district: Tayshetsky District
- Founded: 1897
- Town status since: 1938

Government
  - Head: Alexander Zaika
- Elevation: 320 m (1,050 ft)

Population (2010 Census)
  - Total: 35,485
  - Estimate (2021): 34,491 (−2.8%)

Administrative status
  - Capital of: Tayshetsky District

Municipal status
  - Municipal district: Tayshetsky Municipal District
  - Urban settlement: Tayshetskoye Urban Settlement
  - Capital of: Tayshetsky Municipal District, Tayshetskoye Urban Settlement
- Time zone: UTC+8 (MSK+5)
- Postal codes: 664802, 665000–665006, 665008–665010
- Dialing code: +7 39563
- OKTMO ID: 25636101001
- Website: gorodtaishet.ru

Tayshet (Russian: Тайшет, IPA: [tɐjˈʂɛt], lit. cold river in the Kott language) is a town and the administrative center of Tayshetsky District in Irkutsk Oblast, Russia, located 669 kilometers (416 mi) northwest of Irkutsk, the administrative center of the oblast. Population: 35,485 (2010 census); 38,535 (2002 census); 42,391 (1989 Soviet census).

== History ==
It was founded in 1897 as a supply point and station on the Trans-Siberian Railway and was granted town status in 1938.

During the 1930s–1950s, Tayshet was the center of administration for gulag labor camps Ozerlag and Angarstroy. Construction of the first section of the Baikal–Amur Mainline started in 1937 and was managed from here. According to some survivor accounts, between Tayshet and Bratsk there is "a dead man under every sleeper." Along with Japanese prisoners from the Kwantung Army, German prisoners of war formed a large proportion of the forced labor contingent, generally under a 25-year sentence, such as Dietrich von Saucken. Surviving German POWs were repatriated in autumn of 1955, after West German Chancellor Konrad Adenauer's visit to Moscow.

== Administrative and municipal status ==
Within the framework of administrative divisions, Tayshet serves as the administrative center of Tayshetsky District, to which it is directly subordinated. As a municipal division, the town of Tayshet is incorporated within Tayshetsky Municipal District as Tayshetskoye Urban Settlement.

== Geography ==
The town is located 669 kilometers (416 mi) northwest of Irkutsk, the administrative center of the oblast.

=== Climate ===
Tayshet has a subarctic climate (Köppen Dfc) bordering on a humid continental climate with warm, humid summers and severely cold, drier winters. The monthly 24-hour average temperature ranges from −18.9 °C (−2.0 °F) in January to 18.4 °C (65.1 °F). Sunshine is generous and the area receives 2,150 hours of bright sunshine annually.

Climate data for Tayshet (1929−2012)
Month	Jan	Feb	Mar	Apr	May	Jun	Jul	Aug	Sep	Oct	Nov	Dec	Year
Record high °C (°F)	6.9 (44.4)	9.9 (49.8)	17.0 (62.6)	27.8 (82.0)	33.6 (92.5)	36.2 (97.2)	36.3 (97.3)	35.7 (96.3)	32.3 (90.1)	24.6 (76.3)	13.9 (57.0)	9.0 (48.2)	36.3 (97.3)
Mean daily maximum °C (°F)	−13.9 (7.0)	−10.0 (14.0)	−1.6 (29.1)	6.9 (44.4)	15.7 (60.3)	22.7 (72.9)	24.7 (76.5)	21.5 (70.7)	14.5 (58.1)	5.6 (42.1)	−5.3 (22.5)	−12.7 (9.1)	5.8 (42.4)
Daily mean °C (°F)	−18.9 (−2.0)	−16.2 (2.8)	−8.1 (17.4)	1.2 (34.2)	9.0 (48.2)	15.9 (60.6)	18.4 (65.1)	15.2 (59.4)	8.3 (46.9)	0.6 (33.1)	−9.8 (14.4)	−17.3 (0.9)	0.0 (32.0)
Mean daily minimum °C (°F)	−24.0 (−11.2)	−22.0 (−7.6)	−14.3 (6.3)	−3.8 (25.2)	2.5 (36.5)	9.0 (48.2)	11.8 (53.2)	9.2 (48.6)	3.2 (37.8)	−3.5 (25.7)	−14.1 (6.6)	−22.1 (−7.8)	−5.5 (22.1)
Record low °C (°F)	−50.0 (−58.0)	−47.8 (−54.0)	−41.8 (−43.2)	−28.5 (−19.3)	−10.3 (13.5)	−5.3 (22.5)	−0.5 (31.1)	−3.9 (25.0)	−10.2 (13.6)	−32.6 (−26.7)	−47.2 (−53.0)	−48.9 (−56.0)	−50.0 (−58.0)
Average precipitation mm (inches)	16.5 (0.65)	12.9 (0.51)	12.6 (0.50)	22.5 (0.89)	35.2 (1.39)	48.9 (1.93)	74.4 (2.93)	73.8 (2.91)	45.4 (1.79)	33.1 (1.30)	25.9 (1.02)	22.6 (0.89)	423.8 (16.71)
Average precipitation days (≥ 0.1 mm)	15.8	12.4	10.6	11.4	12.8	12.6	12.6	14.1	13.2	14.3	16.6	17.2	163.6
Average relative humidity (%)	79.9	75.6	66.8	61.0	56.9	67.0	74.0	76.7	73.7	74.6	78.2	80.9	72.1
Mean monthly sunshine hours	74	117	195	224	263	295	293	249	169	110	66	49	2,104
Source: climatebase.ru

== Transportation ==
Tayshet railway station is a major railway junction. Here the Baikal–Amur Mainline begins, branching northeast from the Trans-Siberian Railway. This is also where the Abakan-Taishet Railway ends. The town is also on the M53 Highway (Moscow to Irkutsk).
