= List of Gulag camps =

The list below, enumerates the selected sites of the Soviet forced labor camps of the Gulag, known in Russian as the "corrective labor camps", abbreviation: ITL. Most of them served mining, construction, and timber works. It is estimated that for most of its existence, the Gulag system consisted of over 30,000 camps, divided into three categories according to the number of prisoners held. The largest camps consisted of more than 25,000 prisoners each, medium size camps held from 5,000 to 25,000 inmates, and the smallest, but most numerous labor camps operated with less than 5,000 people each. Even this incomplete list can give a fair idea of the scale of forced labor in the USSR.

A list of Gulag penal labor camps in the USSR was created in Poland from the personal accounts of labor camp detainees of Polish citizenship. It was compiled by the government of Poland for the purpose of regulation and future financial compensation for World War II victims, and published in a decree of the Council of Ministers of Poland.

== Camp system operation ==
There were a number of particular categories of convicts that were imprisoned there including:

1. Any person convicted to a term of imprisonment of more than three years (all those convicted to less than three years were to be sent to "corrective labor colonies").
2. Opponents of the Soviet rule. Initially these were dubbed "class enemies" (White Army combatants, members of opposition parties, nobility, etc.). Later, when the full victory of the Revolution was declared and there were supposedly no more "class enemies" left, a more flexible term of the enemy of the people was introduced, as well as an infamous Article 58 that covered "counter-revolutionary activities".
3. Soviet combatants returned from captivity. As a rule they were held liable under Article 58.

The prisoners of war were generally imprisoned in special POW camps, which existed independently from the network of corrective labor camps, and were subordinated to a separate administrative apparatus within the NKVD (since 1946: MVD) called GUPVI. However, a fair number of POWs ended up in the regular camp system eventually. Unlike Gulag camps, located primarily in remote areas (mostly in Siberia), most of the POW camps after the war were located in the European part of the Soviet Union (with notable exceptions of the Japanese POW in the Soviet Union), where the prisoners worked on restoration of the country's infrastructure destroyed during the war: roads, railways, plants, etc., see POW labor in the Soviet Union. Polish citizens and members of other nationalities who were imprisoned at the Soviet forced labour camps during World War II worked also for the Soviet Army, digging trenches, employed in lumber and cement works, airport runway construction, and unloading of transport goods.

Location map of the Soviet Gulag system of concentration camps

== Main camp directorates with acronyms ==
- BAM: Baikalo-Amurskaya Magistral, Baikal–Amur Mainline (railway)
- BBK: Belomorsko-Baltiyskiy Kanal, White Sea–Baltic Canal
- ITL: "Ispravitelno-trudovoi lager'", corrective labor camp
- LO: "Lesoobyedinenie", Logging works complex
- CW: Construction Works
- CS: Construction Site
- GES: "Gidroelektrostantsiya", hydro-electric powerplant
- GRU: "Geologo razvedochnogo upravleniye", Geological Survey Directorate
- Dalstroy: Far East regional CW directorate
- SMU: "stroitelno-montazhnoe upravlenie", Administration of construction and installation works
- NKVD: literally, the People's Commissariat of Internal Affairs
- MVD: literally, the Ministry of Internal Affairs
- UVD: literally, the Administration of Internal Affairs, subordinated to GUVD
- GUVD: literally, the Main Administration of Internal Affairs, renamed MVD
- NKV: literally, the People's Commissariat of Arms
- OITK: "Otdel ispravitelno-trudovykh koloniy", corrective labor colonies department
- OLP: "Otdel'ny lagerny punkt", separate camp point
- OGPU: "Ob'yedinennoe glavnoe politicheskoe upravlenie", United Main Political Administration
- PL: to mark sites that also detained Polish nationals
- SGU: "Spetsialʹnoye glavnoye upravleniye Glavspetstsvetmeta", Special Chief Directorate of Glavspetstsvetmet
- TMFM: Traitor of Motherland Family Member (Russian: ЧСИР: член семьи изменника Родины), a category of repressed designated for the family members of the person who was recognized as the Traitor of Motherland; some camps were specifically designated to this category.
- Yeniseystroy: Yenisei River basin regional CW directorate

=== GULAG ===
- GULAG: "Glavnoe Upravlenie Ispravitelno-trudovykh Lagerey", or The Chief Directorate of Corrective Labor Camps
- BAMLag: Directorate of BAM camps
- Belbaltlag: Directorate of White Sea–Baltic Canal camps, refer to previously mentioned BBK
- GUAS: "Glavnoe Upravleniye Aerodromnogo stroitelstva", Chief Directorate of airport construction
- GULGMP: "Glavnoe Upravleniye Lagerey (GUL) Gorno-Metallurgicheskoy Predpriyatiy", Chief Directorate of Camps in Mining and Metallurgical Enterprises
- GULLP: "GUL Lesnoy Promyshlennosti", Chief Directorate of Camps in Forest Industry
- GULTP: "GUL Tyazholoy Promyshlennosti", Chief Directorate of Camps in Heavy Industry
- GULGTS: "GUL Gidrotekhnicheskogo stroitelstva", Chief Directorate of Hydroelectric CW
- GULPS: "GUL Upraveleniye Promyshlennogo stroitel'stva", Chief Directorate of Industrial CW
- GULZhDS: "GUL Zheleznodorozhnogo stroitelstva", Chief Directorate of Railway CW
- GUSHOSDOR, GULShosDor, GULShDOR: "GUL Shosseynykh dorog", Chief Directorate of Camps in Highway CW
- Sevvostlag or SVITL (severo-vostochnye lagerya): Directorate of North-Eastern Camps, until 1939 was an independent system of labor camps outside of the main administration of camps, GULAG.
- USLON: "Upravlenie Severnykh Lagerey Osobogo Naznacheniya", Directorate of Northern Special Purpose Camps
  - USKMITL: "Upravlenie Solovetskogo and Karelo-Murmanskikh ITL", Directorate of Solovki and Karelia–Murmansk Camps
  - SLON: "Solovetski Lager Osobogo Naznachenia", Solovki Special Purpose Camp
- KhOZU: "Khozyaystvennoe upravlenie MVD", Economic Directorate of the MVD
- UITLK: "Upravleniye Ispravitelno-trudovykh Lagerey i Koloniy", Directorate of Corrective Labor Camps and Colonies
- USVITL: "Upravleniye Severo-Vostochnykh Ispravitelʹno-trudovykh Lagerey", Directorate of Northeast Corrective Labor Camps

== Construction works ==
- Administration of corrective labor camps of "Apatit" industrial complex
- General Administration of Petroleum Refinery and Synthetic Fuels Construction of MVD
- (PL) ITLs servicing CSs ## 6, 16, 18, 90, 100, 105, 106, 108, 141, 159, 211, 213, 247, 258, 263, 304, 313, 442, 447, 462, 496, 505, 506, 507, 508, 509, 510, 511, 513, 514, 514, 560, 565, 585, 600, 601, 620, 665, 770, 790, 791, 833, 855, 859, 865, 880, 882, 883, 885, 896, 907, 915, 940, 994 (PL)
- (PL) ITLs servicing GUShosDor CSs ## 1–8, 19 (PL)
- (PL) ITLs servicing SMU ## 41—53 (PL)
- Krasnoyarsk CS and ITL of Yeniseystroy (PL)
- ITL of Special CSs for Cellulose-Paper enterprises of Karelo-Finnish SSR (PL)
- ITL of CS for Arkhangelsk Cellulose-Paper Complex (PL)
- ITL of CSs for hydroelectric power plants on the Biya River (PL)
- ITL of CSs for Vladimir hydroelectric power plant (PL)
- ITL for CSs ##1, 2, 3 of Bashkirian Petroleum Plants Special CW (Bashspecneftestroy) (PL)
- ITL for CSs ##1, 2, 3 of Tatarstan Petroleum Plants Special CW (Tatspecneftestroy) (PL)
- ITL for CS of the Kazan petroleum refinery
- ITL for CSs of hydroelectric power plants on the upper Oka River (PL)
- ITL for CSs of Transcaucasian metallurgical enterprises (PL)
- ITL for CSs of Znamienitaya (плотина «Знаменитая») dam and sluice (PL) on the Northern Dvina Canal
- ITL for CSs of Volga–Don Canal (PL)
- ITL for CSs of Krasnoyarsk–Yeniseysk railway (PL)
- ITL for CSs of Karaganda basin open-cast coal mines (PL)
- Taishet Construction Works

Continued from the Polish Dziennik Ustaw complete listing of NKVD camps with Poles.

- Alluvaysky CS and ITL (PL)
- Yensky CS and ITL (PL)
- Matkozensky CS and ITL (PL)
- Yanstroy ITL of Dalstroy (PL)
- ITL of the Administration of Paved Roads of Dalstroy

== A ==
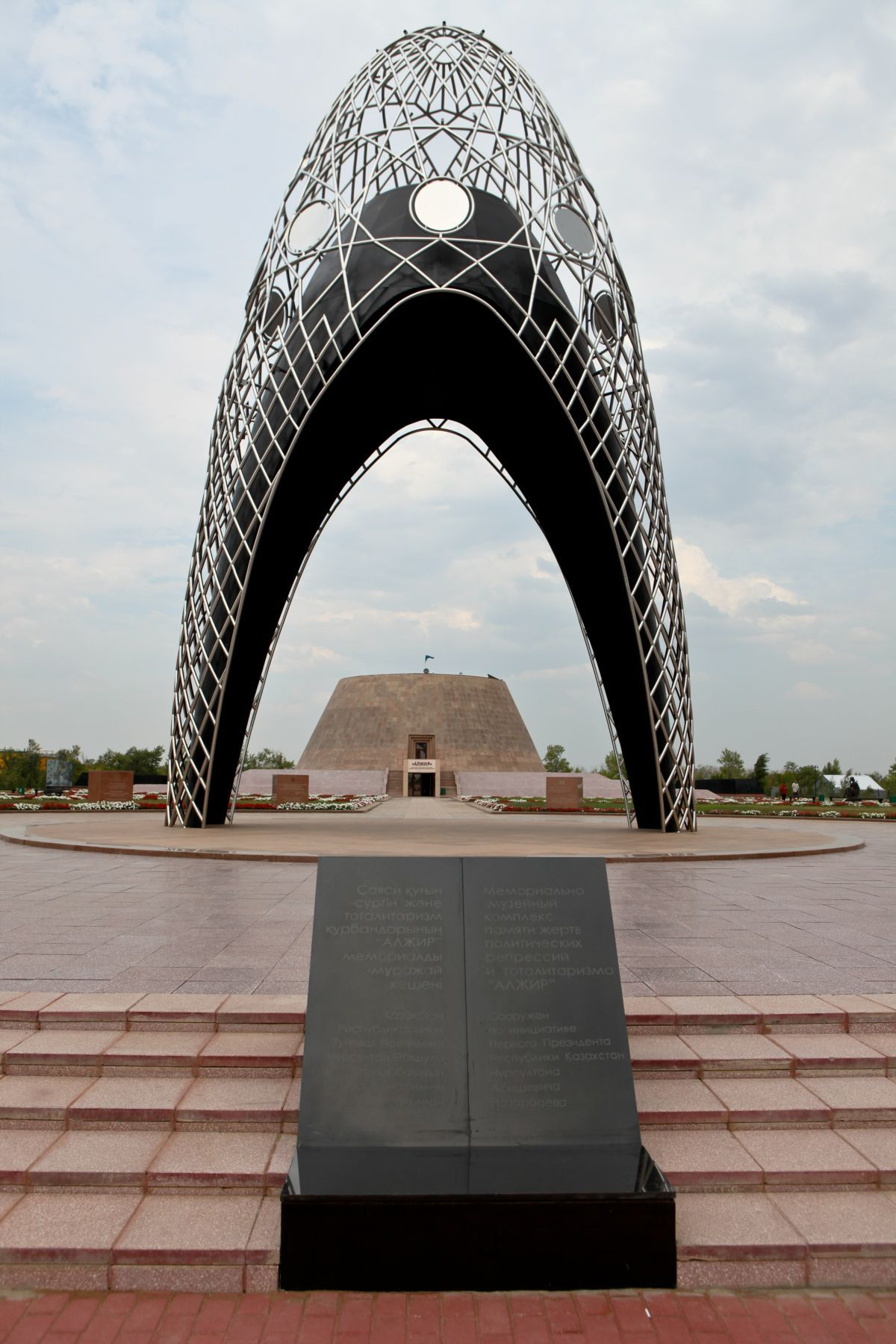
Memorial for the Akmolinsk camp for wives of "traitors of the Motherland" (АЛЖИР)

- Abezlag
- Akhtubinsky ITL (Akhtublag)
- Akhunsky ITL (Akhunlag)
- ALZhIR, camp for wives of "traitors of the Motherland" (АЛЖИР, Акмолинский лагерь жён изменников Родины), an example of a morose Gulag wordplay: Алжир is Algeria (in Siberia...)
- Aktyubinsky ITL (Aktyubinlag)
- Aldan ITL of Dalstroy
- Aldansky ITL (Aldanlag)
- Alluayvskoe CS and ITL (PL) (Alluayvstroy)
- Altaysky ITL (Altaylag)
- Amgunsky ITL (Amgunlag)
- Amursky ITL (Amurlag)
- Amur Railway ITL (Amurlag)
- Lower Amur ITL
- Angarsky ITL (Angarlag)
- Angrensky ITL (Angrenlag)
- Aralichevsky ITL (Aralichevlag)
- Arkhangelsky ITL (Arkhbumlag; renamed ITL and construction of Arkhangelsk TsBK in 1940)
- Arkhangelsky transit point OGPU (Arkhperpunkt)
- Astrakhansky ITL (Astrakhanlag)
- Avrotransportny ITL of Dalstroy (Translag)
- Azovsky ITL (Azovlag)
- Azovskoe LO (Azovlag)

Continued from the Polish Dziennik Ustaw complete listing of NKVD camps with Poles.

- Archpierpunkt
- Atbasarski ITL

== B ==
- Baikal-Amur ITL (Bamlag), Baikal–Amur Mainline ITLs
- Bakalsky ITL (Bakalstroy, Bakallag)
- Bakovsky ITL (Bakovlag)
- Balaganskoe LO
- Balakhninsky ITL (Balakhlag)
- Baleysky ITL (Baleylag)
- Barashevsky ITL and GULAG industrial complex (Barashevlag)
- Baydarsky ITL (Baydarlag)
- Belogorsky ITL (Belogorlag)
- Belomorstroy and ITL (ITL of Belomorstroy, ITL at Belomorstroy, Belbaltlag, ITL and the Construction of the White Sea-Baltic Canal)
- Belorechensky ITL (Belrechlag)
- Beregovoy Camp (Berlag, MVD Special Camp No. 5)
- Bereznikovsky ITL (Bereznyaklag, Berezlag)
- Beskudnikovskoe Special LO
- Bezymyansky ITL (Bezymyanlag)
- Birsky ITL (Birlag)
- Bodaybinsky ITL (Bodaybinlag)
- Bogoslovsky ITL and construction of aluminum plant (Bogoslovag)
- Borsky ITL (Borlag) (55°54′44″N 117°42′39″E)
- Bratsky ITL and Taishet construction (Directorate of Taishet Construction and Bratsky ITL, Bratsky ITL)
- Buchenwald called Special camp No 2 of the NKVD. Part of the GULAG from 1948 to 1950; transferred to GDR control by Kruglov.
- Bukachachinsky ITL (Bukachachlag)
- Bureinsky ITL (Burlag), concentrating on BAM construction; merged into Nizhne-Amursky ITL in 1942
- Butugychag, Uranium mine and Special ITL (Magadan Oblast), headed by Dalstroy, later, at closing, Sevvostlag. Coordinates: 61 18'05.65" N 149 02'53.34" E

Continued from the Polish Dziennik Ustaw complete listing of NKVD camps, and the Russian Карта ГУЛАГа – Мемориал

- Bakalsky ITL (Bakalstroy, Bakallag)
- Bakovsky ITL (Bakovlag)
- Baleysky ITL
- Balachlag
- Barashevsky ITL and Industrial Complex of GULAG (Barashevlag; transferred to Dubravnogo Camp in 1954)
- Baydarsky ITL (Baydarlag)
- Bazhenovsky ITL (Bazhenovlag)
- Belokorovichsky camp of the OITK NKVD of BSSR
- Beregovoy Camp (MVD Special Camp No. 5, Berlag)
- Berezovsky ITL (1947–1948, Berezovlag)
- Berezovsky ITL (1954–1956, Berezovlag)
- Berezovsky ITL of Northern directorate of GULZhDS (Berezovlag)
- Bezymyansky ITL (Bezymyanlag)
- Bobrovskoe LO (Bobrovlag)
- Borsky ITL (Borlag) (55°54′44″N 117°42′39″E)
- Burepolomsky ITL (Burepolomlag, reorganized into LO No. 4 UITLK UMVD for Gorky Oblast in 1953)

== C ==
- Central Asian ITL (Sazlag, Sazulon, Central Asian camps, Directorate of Central Asian labor camp and colonies of the NKVD of the Uzbek SSR, UITLK of the NKVD of the Uzbek SSR)
- Chapayevsky ITL (Chapayevskoe construction, Chapayevstroy, ITL Directorate of Restoration Works; subordinated to Chelyabmetallurgstroy)
- Chaunsky ITL of Dalstroy (Chaunlag, ITL Administration P.O. Box 14)
- Chaun-Chukotsky ITL of Dalstroy (Chaunchukotlag, Chaun-Chukotsky ITL USVITL)
- Cheboksarsky ITL (Cheboksarlag; became an independent LO as part of Tagilsky ITL in 1943)
- Chelyabinsky ITL (Chelyablag; former ITL Chelyametallurgstroy)
- Cherepovetsky ITL (Cherepovetslag)
- Chernogorsky ITL (Chernogorskstroy, Chernogorlag)
- Chernogorsky Special ITL
- Chernoistochinsky ITL (Chernoyistochensky ITL, Chernoistochlag)
- Chukotsky ITL of Dalstroy (ITL Chukotstroy, Chukotstroylag, Chukotsky ITL USVITL, LO Chukotstroy)
- Construction and Operations Directorate 11 and ITL (Aldan ITL 11, ITL No. 11, SEU No. 11 and ITL)
- Construction 6 and ITL (transferred to Nizhne-Amur ITL in 1953)
- Construction 16 and ITL (renamed Kitoysky ITL in 1953)
- Construction 18 and ITL (renamed Khakassky ITL in 1953)
- Construction 90 and ITL (formerly ITL Spetsstroy; renamed Construction 560 and ITL in 1949)
- Construction 105 and ITL (reorganized into Construction 106 and ITL in 1940)
- Construction 106 and ITL
- Construction 108 and ITL
- Construction 159 and ITL (ITL Construction 159)
- Construction 200 and Luzhsky ITL (Luzhlag)
- Construction 201 and ITL (Nikolaevsky ITL)
- Construction 210 and ITL
- Construction 211 and ITL
- Construction 213 and ITL (Nakhodka Bay, transferred to Dalstroy in 1941)
- Construction 247 and ITL (renamed Kuznetsky ITL in 1953)
- Construction 258 and ITL (ITL and Construction 258)
- Construction 263 and ITL (Sovgavan, ITL Construction 263)
- Construction 304 and ITL
- Construction 313 and ITL (renamed Bobrovskoe LO in 1953)
- Construction 352 and ITL (Noginsky ITL, ITL and Construction 352)
- Construction 384 and ITL (Glazovlag, Glazovsky ITL)
- Construction 442 and ITL (renamed Gorodskoe LO in 1953)
- Construction 447 and ITL
- Construction 462 and ITL (renamed Azovsky ITL in 1953)
- Construction 496 and ITL (renamed Construction 258 and ITL in 1949)
- Construction 500
- Construction 505 and ITL GULZhDS (renamed Selenginsky ITL in 1953)
- Construction 505 and ITL GULPS (renamed Construction 585 and ITL in 1949)
- Construction 506 and ITL
- Construction 507 and ITL (became part of Nizhamurlag in 1953)
- Construction 508 and ITL (renamed Ulminsky ITL in 1953)
- Construction 509 and ITL (transferred to Belorechensky ITL in 1953)
- Construction 510 and ITL
- Construction 511 and ITL
- Construction 513 and ITL
- Construction 514 and ITL (renamed Krasnogorsky ITL in 1953)
- Construction 514 and ITL GULZhDS
- Construction 560 and ITL (transferred to Construction 565 and ITL in 1952)
- Construction 565 and ITL (renamed Bakovsky ITL in 1953)
- Construction 585 and ITL (renamed Belogorsk ITL in 1953)
- Construction 600 and ITL (renamed Kamensky ITL in 1953)
- Construction 601 and ITL (renamed Voroninosky ITL in 1953)
- Construction 612 and ITL (renamed Podgorny ITL in 1953)
- Construction 620 and ITL (renamed Podlesnoe LO in 1953)
- Construction 621 and ITL (ITL at construction department for construction of mining department No. 10)
- Construction 665 and ITL
- Construction 713 and ITL (Noginsky ITL; renamed Construction 352 and ITL in 1949)
- Construction 730 and ITL (Belozerskoye LO)
- Construction 770 and ITL
- Construction 790 and ITL (renamed Yermakovskoye LO in 1953)
- Construction 791 and ITL
- Construction 833 and ITL (renamed Construction 620 and ITL in 1949
- Construction 855 and ITL
- Construction 859 and ITL (renamed Construction 247 and ITL in 1949)
- Construction 865 and ITL (renamed Construction 313 and ITL in 1949)
- Construction 880 and ITL (renamed Construction 505 and ITL GULPS in 1949)
- Construction 881 and ITL (renamed Construction 915 and ITL in 1949)
- Construction 882 and ITL (renamed Construction 940 and ITL in 1949)
- Construction 883 and ITL (merged into Construction 896 and ITL in 1948)
- Construction 885 and ITL
- Construction 896 and ITL (renamed Construction 665 and ITL in 1949)
- Construction 904 and ITL (renamed Construction 384 and ITL in 1949)
- Construction 907 and ITL (renamed Construction 447 and ITL in 1949)
- Construction 915 and ITL
- Construction 940 and ITL
- Construction 994 and ITL (renamed ITL and construction of mining and metallurgical enterprises in 1950)
- Construction 1001 and ITL
- Construction 1418 and ITL (renamed Construction 514 and ITL in 1949)
- Construction GUShOSDORA MVD No. 1 – No. 8 and ITL
- Construction GUShOSDORA MVD No. 17 and ITL
- Construction GUShOSDORA MVD No. 19 and ITL
- Construction GUShOSDORA NKVD No. 1 – No. 4 and ITL

Continued from the Polish Dziennik Ustaw complete listing of NKVD camps with Poles.

- Chistyungsky health camp (Chistyunlag, Chistyungsky invalid ITL); reorganized in LO UITLK UMVD for the Altai Region in 1951)

== D ==
- Dalniy Camp (MVD Special Camp No. 11, Dallag)
- Dal'ny-Vostokny ITL (Dallag)
- Darasunskoe LO (Vershino-Darasunskoe LO)
- Dmitrovsky ITL (Dmitlag, Dmitrovlag, DITLag, DITL; reorganized into its own Gulag district in 1938)
- Donlag (Don)
- Dorozhny ITL of Dalstroy (Dorozhnoe LO, Dorozhno-construction LO USVITL, Dorozhno-construction ITL, Dorlag, Dorstroylag, ITL Dorozhnogo construction, LO Dorozhnogo construction)
- Dubogorskoe LO (Dubogorsky ITL, Dubogorlag)
- Dubravny Camp (Dubravlag, MVD Special Camp No. 3, Dubravny ITL); became a Soviet penitentiary in 1960 and a Russian prison in 2005)
- Dzhezkagansky ITL (Dzhezkazganlag; reorganized into LO Karagandinskogo ITL in 1943)
- Dzhidinsky ITL (Dzhidinlag, Dzhidlag)
- Dzhugdzhursky ITL (Dzhugdzhurlag)

== E ==
- Eastern Administration of Lead Mining and ITL of Yeniseistroy

== G ==
- Gagarinskoe LO (Gagarinsky ITL, Gagarlag)
- Gdovsky ITL (Gdovlag)
- Glazovsky LO (Glazovlag, LO at Construction 384)
- Gorny Camp (MVD Special Camp No. 2, Gorlag; merged back into Norillag in 1954)
- Gornaya Shoriya ITL
- Gornoshersky ITL (Gorshorlag)
- Gorodskoe LO (Gorlag)
- Granitny ITL and special construction department 505 (Granitny ITL)
- Guryevsky ITL (Gurlag)
- Gusino-Ozersky ITL (Gusinoozerlag)

== I ==
- Ilimsky Special ITL
- Indigirsky ITL of Dalstroy (Indirlag, Indigirsky ITL of USVITL)
- Intinsky ITL (Intalag; reorganized into Minlag in 1948)
- Inza- Syzran ITL
- ITL of the Aldan road construction department of Dalstroy (Aldanstroy, Aldan ITL of Dalstroy)
- ITL and 10th field construction NKVD
- ITL and construction of Bashkirian Petroleum Plant (Bashspetneftestroy) No. 1 – No. 4 (PL)
- ITL and construction of Tatarstan Petroleum Plant (Tatspetsneftestroy) No. 1 & No. 2 (PL)
- ITL and construction of "V-1"
- ITL and construction of Arkhangelsk TsBK
- ITL and construction of Borovichevskoy GES
- ITL and construction of Buyskikh GES
- ITL and construction for the reconstruction of the "Znamenitaya" lock and dam (Znamenitstroy)
- ITL and construction of the Aktovrakskogo industrial complex
- ITL and construction of the 4th coal opening plant of the Karaganda region (Construction No. 4 and ITL GULZhDS, Karagandaugol NKVD)
- ITL and construction of separate Dimitrovsky District of Gulag
- ITL and construction of the Khimki District of Gulag (Khimkinsky ITL, Khimlag)
- ITL and construction of industrial combine No. 7 (renamed Construction 907 and ITL in 1947)
- ITL and construction of iron ore mine
- ITL and construction of the Kazan oil refinery (Kazanneftestroy)
- ITL and construction of the Krasnoyarsk–Yeniseisk Railway
- ITL and construction of Mstinskikh GES
- ITL and construction of NKV plant No. 8
- ITL and construction of a special district (Stroylag)
- ITL and construction of the Stalinist pumping station
- ITL and construction of state farms and silos (Atbasarsky ITL)
- ITL and construction of the southeast harbor (PL) (ITL construction of the Southern Harbor)
- ITL and construction of special region
- ITL and construction of Transcaucasian Metallurgical Plant (Zakmetallurgstroy, ZMS)
- ITL and construction of upper Ob hydroelectric plant
- ITL and construction of Upper Oka GES
- ITL and construction of upper Samgorsky irrigation system, Tbilisi
- ITL and construction of the Vladimirskoy GES (PL)
- ITL and construction of the Volga-Don waterway (Volgodonstroy)
- ITL "Apatit" industrial combine (merged into Belorechensky LO in 1953)
- ITL "ASh" (ITL and SMU PO box 29, ITL SMU 47)
- ITL of the Berelekhsky District GRU of Dalstroy
- ITL Board of Dalstroy
- ITL "BZh" (ITL and SMU PO box 23, ITL SMU 41)
- ITL Chelyametallurgstroy (Chelyabinsky ITL, Chelyablag; renamed Chelyabinsky ITL in 1947)
- ITL for airfield construction (1936, never organized; absorbed into the Moscow-Volga Canal as a district)
- ITL for construction of iron mines (PL) (Zhelezlag; renamed Polyansky ITL in 1953)
- ITL for construction of mining and metallurgical enterprises (PL) (renamed ITL for construction of iron mines in 1951)
- ITL for construction of Solikamsk TsBK (ITL of Solikamsk construction, ITL of Solikamstroy, Solikamsky ITL, Solikambumstroy, Solikamlag)
- ITL for construction of Usolsky mining equipment plant (renamed Usolsky ITL SGU in 1949)
- ITL of the Dalstroy Highway Administration (Ushosdorlag)
- ITL of Directorate of Subsidiary Farms of Dalstroy (PL) (Elgenskoe LO, LO Elgen)
- ITL of the Dmitrov Mechanical Plant
- ITL "DS" of Yeniseistroy (renamed Taezhny ITL in 1953)
- ITL "DT" (ITL and SMU PO box 33, ITL SMU 51)
- ITL "DYu" (ITL and SMU PO box 26, ITL SMU 44; absorbed into ITL "GA" in 1953)
- ITL "EL" (PL) (ITL of the geological exploration expedition; renamed Ostrovskoe LO in 1953)
- ITL "EM" (ITL and construction of coal mine; renamed Dubogorskoe LO in 1953)
- ITL "EN" (ITL and oil exploration expedition; renamed Mostovskoe LO in 1953)
- ITL "EO" (ITL and Mine Construction; renamed Gagarinskoe LO in 1953)
- ITL "EShch" (ITL and SMU PO box 31, ITL SMU 49)
- ITL "EYa" (ITL and SMU PO box 28, ITL SMU 46)
- ITL "GA" (ITL and SMU PO box 25, ITL SMU 43)
- ITL "GB" (ITL and SMU PO box 29, ITL SMU 47; absorbed into ITL "EShch" in 1953)
- ITL "IN" (ITL and SMU PO box 32, ITL SMU 50)
- ITL industrial combine No. 6
- ITL industrial combine No. 9 (Palmnikenlag)
- ITL industrial combine No. 11
- ITL "KA" (ITL and SMU PO box 34, ITL SMU 52)
- ITL Kolyma-Indigirka river shipping company of Dalstroy (Zyryanlag, Zyryanskoye LO, Kolyma-Indigirka LO of USVITLA, LO of the Kolyma-Indigirka River Shipping Company, ITL of the Kolyma-Indigirka River Transport)
- ITL "NL"
- ITL No. 17 GUShOSDOR
- ITL at Oboronstroe
- ITL Omskstroy (Omsky ITL, Omlag)
- ITL "Promzhilstroy" of Dalstroy (ITL Promzhilstroy, LO Promzhilstroy, Construction LO USVITL, Stroylagotdeleniye)
- ITL of refinery plant No. 169 (ITL of the Krasnoyarsk Refinery Plant, Krasnoyarsk Refinery Plant, Affinazhstroy)
- ITL special construction site No. 881
- ITL Spetsstroy (renamed Construction 90 and ITL in 1947)
- ITL of special construction
- ITL at Uglich bridge structures plant No. 4 of GUShOSDOR (Uglich Plant of Bridge Structures and ITL No. 4 of GUShOSDOR)
- ITL Usolgidroles
- ITL "VCh" (ITL and SMU PO box 24, ITL SMU 42)
- ITL Volgostroy (Volzhsky ITL, Volgolag)
- ITL Yanstroy of Dalstroy (PL) (Khandygsky ITL USVITLa, ITL "Yanstroy", Yanstroylag, LO Yanstroya)
- ITL "ZhK" (ITL and SMU PO box 27, ITL SMU 45)
- ITL "ZhR" (ITL and SMU PO box 35, ITL SMU 53)
- Ivdelsky ITL (Ivdellag)

Continued from the Polish Dziennik Ustaw complete listing of NKVD camps with Poles.

- ITL and construction of Ore Mine (ITŁ i Budowa Kopalni Rudy)
- ITL and coal mine construction (ITŁ i Budowa Kopalni Węgla)
- ITL and the petroleum expedition (ITŁ i Ekspedycja Poszukująca Ropy Naftowej)
- ITL at construction of Karagandastroy (ITŁ przy Budowie Karagandażyłstroju)
- ITL at construction board of ore mine directorate No. 10 (ITŁ przy Zarządzie Budowy Dyrekcji Kopalń Rudy nr 10)
- ITL Belomorstroy (ITŁ Biełomorstroju)
- ITL Construction of Mining and Metallurgical Enterprises (ITŁ Budowy Przedsiębiorstw Górniczo-Metalurgicznych)
- ITL Construction of Southern Harbor (ITŁ Budowy Przystani Południowej)
- ITL Geological-Exploration Expedition (ITŁ Ekspedycji Geologiczno-Poszukiwawczej)
- ITL Industrial and Housing Construction (ITŁ Budownictwa Przemysłowego i Mieszkaniowego)
- ITL Iron Ore Mine Construction (ITŁ Budowy Kopalń Rudy Żelaza)
- ITL Krasnoyarsk Affiliation Institute (ITŁ Krasnojarskiego Zakładu Afinacji)
- ITL of Yansky Mining and Industry Directorate (ITŁ Jańskiego Zarządu Górniczo-Przemysłowego)
- ITL of Directorate of Dalstroy Auxiliary Farms (ITŁ Zarządu Gospodarstw Pomocniczych Dalstroju)

== K ==
- Kalachevsky ITL (ITL and Construction of Volga-Don Shipping Canal, ITL and Construction of Volga-Don connecting canal)
- Kaluzhsky ITL (ITL and construction of Moscow-Kiev highway, Kaluglag)
- Kamensky ITL (1942–1944; Kamenlag, Novo-Kamensky ITL)
- Kamensky ITL (1953–1954; Kamenlag)
- Kamyshovy Camp (MVD Special Camp No. 10; Kamyshovlag, Kamyshlag)
- Kandalakshinsky ITL (ITL and Construction of Kandalakshinsky aluminum plant, Kandalakshstroy; transferred to Karagandinsky ITL in 1948)
- Karagandazhilstroy and ITL
- Karagandinsky ITL (Karlag)
- Karakumsky ITL (Karakumlag; ITL Sredazgidrostroy; ITL and construction of the Main Turkmen Canal)
- Kargopolsky ITL, Yertsevo (КАРГОПОЛЬЛАГ)
- Kaspiysky ITL (ITL at directorate of Construction No. 2 GUAS, NKVD Building No. 2, Kaspiylag)
- Kazakhstansky ITL OGPU (Kazlag)
- Keksgolmsky ITL (ITL Special construction of pulp and paper objects of the Karelian-Finnish SSR, ITL special construction on the Karelian isthmus, Keksgolmlag)
- Kemerovozhilstroy and ITL
- Kengir
- Khabarovsky ITL (Khabarlag)
- Khakassky ITL (Khakasslag)
- Khakassky ITL UITLK UMVD for Krasnoyarsk Krai
- Khakasskoe LO
- Khimkinsky OLP (Khimki camp site, Khimlaguchastok, LP for the construction of the Glavpromstroy mechanical base)
- Kimpersaysky ITL (Kimpersaylag)
- Kirovlag ITL
- Kitoisky ITL (Kitoylag)
- Kizelovsky ITL (Kizellag)
- Klyuchevsky ITL (ITL and construction of the Klyuchev complex; Klyuchevlag)
- Kochkarskoe LO (Kochkarlag)
- Kokshinsky ITL
- Kolsky ITL and special construction 33 (Kollag; Kolskogo ITL and UNKVD colonies for the Murmansk region; transferred to Construction 106 and ITL in 1941)
- Koslansky ITL (Koslanlag)
- Kosvinsky ITL (Kosvinlag, Kosvinstroy)
- Kotlassky GULZhDS department
- Kotlassky transit and trans shipment point GULAG
- Kotlassky agricultural ITL (Kotlaslag)
- Kotlassky agricultural LO
- Kovrovsky ITL (ITL and Construction of the Nizhne-Klyazminskaya GES, ITL and Construction of Kovrovskaya GES; Kovrovges)
- Krasnogorsky ITL (Krasnogorlag)
- Krasnoyarskoe construction and ITL of Yeniseistroy
- Krasnoyarsky ITL (Kraslag)
- Krasnoyarsk Office of Special Construction and ITL, mailbox 138
- Kuloisky ITL (КУЛОЙЛАГ)
- Kuneevsky ITL (ITL and construction of Kuibyshev GES)
- Kungursky ITL
- Kuryanovsky ITL
- Kusinsky ITL (Kusinlag)
- Kuzbassky ITL (Kuzbasszhilstroy, Kuzbasslag)
- Kuznetsky ITL (Kuznetslag)

== L ==
- Likovsky ITL and construction 204 (Likovlag)
- LO at Voroshilov plant
- LO at "Sacca and Vanzetti" sovkhoz (Cherdaklag)
- LO Central Hospital, Dalstroy
- LO Lower Indigirka district exploration Dalstroy Directorate (LO Ozhogino)
- Lobvinsky ITL (Lobvinlag, Lobvinstroy, ITL and construction of Lobvin hydrolysis plant)
- Lokchimsky ITL (Lokchimlag)
- Lugovoy Camp (MVD Special Camp No. 9, Luglag)
- Luzhsky ITL and construction 200 (Luzhlag, Construction 200 and ITL)
- Lysogorskoe LO (Lysogorlag, LO at Construction 621)

== M ==
Continued from the Polish Dziennik Ustaw complete listing of NKVD camps with Poles.

- Magadansky ITL, Dalstroy (Maglag)
- Mariysky ITL
- Makarovskoe LO (Makarlag; transferred to Kuznetskogo ITL)
- Markovsky ITL (ITL and construction of the Northern Water Pipeline station, Sevvodstroy)
- Martynovsky ITL (ITL and construction of Volgodostroy irrigation facilities; merged with Tslimlyansky ITL to form Nizhne-Donskoy ITL in 1952)
- Matkozhnenskoe construction and ITL (Matkozhlag)
- Maykainskoe LO
- Medvezhiegorsk health camp (Medvezhegorlag, Medvezhyegorsk ITL, Medvezhyegorsk invalid ITL)
- Mekhrennsky ITL (Mekhrenlag)
- Mineevskoe LO KhOZU MVD
- Mineralny Camp (Minlag, Special Camp No. 1, became Mineralny ITL in 1954)
- Minusinskoe LO SGU
- Molotovsky ITL (ITL Molotovstroy, Molotovlag)
- Monchegorsky ITL and construction of "Severonikel" plant (Monchegolag)
- Moskovsko-Ugolny ITL (Mosugol)
- Moskovsky Logging ITL (Mosleslag)
- Mostovskoe LO (Mostovlag, Mostovsky ITL)

== N ==
- Niebitdaski ITŁ
- Neftestroylag
- Nemnyrsky ITL (ITL at the "Aldanlyuda" trust, Nemnyrlag)
- Nerchinsky ITL (Nerchinlag)
- Nerchinskoe LO (Nerchinskoe agricultural LO)
- Nikolayevsky ITL
- Nizhne-Amursky ITL (Nizhamurlag, Nizhne-Amurlag, Nizhneamurlag)
- Nizhegorodsky ITL
- Nizhne-Volzhsky ITL (merged with Saratovsky ITL and Volgozheldorstroy Administration in 1942 to form Privolzhsky ITL)
- Norilsky ITL (Norillag, Norilstroy; June 25, 1935 to August 22, 1956)
- Northern OGPU special purpose camps (USEVLON, Sevlag, SEVLON)
- North Directorate ITL and construction 503 (Северная Совет)
- Novokimensky ITL
- Novo-Tambovsky ITL (Novotambovlag)
- Nyrobsky ITL (Nyroblag)

== O ==
- Obsky ITL
- Obsky ITL and construction 501 (Obskoe upr. GULZhDS, ITL at construction 501, Construction 501; part of camp liquidated and remainder became a portion of Pechorsk ITL in 1954)
- Olkhovsky health camp (Olkhovlag, Olkhovsky ITL, Olkhovsky invalid ITL)
- OLP construction building No. 1 GULAG NKVD
- Omsky ITL and construction 166 (Omlag)
- Omsukchansky ITL Dalstroy (Omsukchanskoe LO, Omsukchansky ITL USVITL, Omsukchanlag)
- Onezhsky ITL (Oneglag)
- Opoksky ITL (ITL construction of the Opoksky hydroelectric complex, ITL and construction of the Opoksky hydroelectric complex, Opokstroy, Opoklag)
- Orlovsky ITL, Orlovlag (ОРЛОВСКИЙ ИТЛ, Орловлаг)
- Ostrovskoye LO (Ostrovsky ITL, Ostrovlag)
- Ozerny/Ozyorny Camp (Ozerny ITL, Ozerlag, MVD special camp No. 7)

== P ==
- Paninskoe LO (Paninlag)
- Pavlovdarsky ITL (Pavlodarlag)
- Pavlovskoe LO
- Pechorsky ITL (Pechorlag)
- Perevalny ITL (Perevallag; transferred to Nizhne-Amursky ITL in 1945)
- Peschany Camp (MVD Special Camp No. 8, Peschanlag, Peschany ITL)
- Podgorny ITL (Podgorlag)
- Podlesnoe LO (Podleslag)
- Podolsky ITL (Podollag)
- Polyansky ITL (Polyanlag)
- Ponyshsky ITL (Ponyslag)
- Prikaspisky ITL and construction 107 (Construction 107)
- Primorsky ITL (Primorskoe LO, Primorlag; 1947–1953)
- Primorsky ITL Dalstroy (Primorlag, Primlag, Primorskoe LO)
- Primorsky railway ITL and construction 206 (Primorlag)
- Primorsky district Dalstroy (Primorsky district of Sevvostlag)
- Privolzhsky ITL (Privolzhlag)
- Prorvinsky ITL (Prorvlag)
- Przełęczowy ITŁ
- Pudozhgorsky ITL (Pudozhstroy, ITL and construction of the Pudozhgorsk metallurgical complex)
- Pudozhskoe LO

== R ==
- Raychikhinsky ITL (Raychikhlag)
- Rechnoy Camp (MVD Special Camp No. 6, Rechlag)
- Rudbaykalstroy and ITL (ITL Rudbakalstroy)
- Rybinsky ITL (Rybinlag)

== S ==
Continued from the Russian Карта ГУЛАГа – Мемориал listing of NKVD camps, and the Polish Dziennik Ustaw listing of camps.

- Sakhalinsky ITL (САХАЛИНСКИЕ ИТЛ; Sakhalinlag, Sakhalinstroy)
- Samarsky ITL and Kuibyshev hydrosystem construction (Samarsky ITL, Samarlag)
- Saransky ITL and construction GULZhDS (Saransky ITL, Saranstroy, Sarantstroy)
- Saratovsky ITL (Saratovlag, Saratovstroy, 1942; merged with Nizhne-Volzhsky ITL and Volgozheldorstroy Administration in 1942 to form Privolzhsky ITL)
- Saratovsky ITL (ITL at Saratovstroy, Saratovlag; 1946–1956)
- Sarovsky ITL
- Sarovsky special quarantine camp OGPU
- Segezhsky ITL (Segezhlag)
- Selenginsky ITL (Selenginlag)
- Severny ITL Dalstroy (Sevlag, Northern ITL USVITLa)
- Severny Railway ITL (Sevzheldorlag; merged with Severo-Pechorsky ITL to form Pechorsky ITL in 1950)
- Severo-Dvinsky ITL (Sevdvinlag)
- Severo-Kuzbassky ITL (Sevkuzbasslag)
- Severo-Pechorsky (Sevpechlag, Pechora railway ITL, Pechora ITL, Pechorstroy, Pechorlag)
- Severo-Vostochny ITL (Northeast ITL, Sevvostlag, Dalstroy ITL)
- Severo-Uralsky ITL (Sevurallag)
- Shakhtinsky ITL (Shakhtlag)
- Shchugorsky ITL (Shchugorugol, Shchugorlag; formerly a part of Intinskogo ITL before 1945, reorganized into LO Intalaga in 1946)
- Sheksninsky ITL GULGTS
- Sheksninsky ITL MVD (Sheksninlag; merged with Vytegorsky ITL into Volgo-Baltisky ITL in 1952)
- Shirokovsky ITL (Shirokstroy, Shirok-Vilukhstroy, Shiroklag; became Kosvinsky ITL in 1949)
- Shosdorlag (Ushosdorlag, Ushosstroylag; formerly a portion of the Far East ITL before 1937)
- Shozhemsky ITL
- Sibirsky ITL (Sibulon, Siblag)
- Solikamsky health camp (Solikamozdorlag, Solikamsky invalid ITL)
- Solikamsky ITL
- Solovetsky ITL OGPU (Solovetsky special purpose camps, Solovetsky special forced labor camp OGPU, SLON, SLAG, Solovetsky and Karelo-Murmansk camps, SKMITL)
- Soroksky ITL (СОРОКЛАГ)
- Sosnovsky ITL (Sosnovlag; formed out of LO 5 and 7 of Kuznetsky ITL in 1954 and rolled back into Kuznetsky ITL in 1956)
- Sredne-Belsky ITL (Srednebellag)
- Stalingradsky ITL (Stalingradlag; renamed Lower Volga ITL in 1942)
- Staroselskoe LO (Starosellag)
- Stepnoy Camp (Steplag, MVD Special Camp No. 4, Stepnoy ITL)
- Stepnovskoe LO
- Sukhodolskoe LO (Sukhodolsky ITL)
- Sukhanovo
- Svirsky ITL (Svirlag)
- Sviyazhskoe LO (LO at the Sviyazh plant number 1 GULZhDS)
- Svobodnensky ITL (Svobodlag)
- Syzransky ITL (Inza-Syzransky ITL, Inzasyzranlag, Syzranlag)

== T ==
- Tagilsky ITL (Nizhnetagilsky ITL, Tagillag, Tagilstroy)
- Taiga ITL (Taezhlag)
- Taiga Mining Authority and ITL Yeniseystroy Directorate (ITL PO Box 55; became LO P/Y 55 and subordinated to UITL "DS" of Yeniseystroy)
- Takhtamygdinskoe LO
- Taseevsky ITL (ITL and construction of the Taseevsky mine)
- Tavdinsky ITL (Tavdinlag)
- Tayshetsky ITL GULAG
- Tayshetsky ITL GULZhDS (Tayshetstroy; merged into Angarsky ITL in 1948)
- Tayshetsky ITL UITLK UNKVD in Irkutsk region (Tayshetlag, Tayshetsky NKVD camp)
- Temnikovsky ITL (Temlag; merged into Dubravlag in 1948)
- Tenkinsky ITL Dalstroy (Tenlag, Tenkinsky ITL of USVITL)
- Tikhvin ITL (Tikhvinlag)
- Togulym
- Tomsky ITL (ITL "A" OITK UMVD in Tomsk Oblast; reorganized into LO OITK UMVD for Tomsk Oblast in 1949)
- Tomsko-Asinsky ITL (Tomasinlag, Томско-Асинский ИТЛ), subcamp of Siblag in Asino
- Tom-Usinsky ITL
- Transit LO Dalstroy (Transit-transfer OLP)
- Tsimlyansky ITL (Construction and ITL of the Tsimlyansk hydroelectric complex, ITL at the SU of the Tsimlyansk hydroelectric complex; merged with Martynovsky ITL into ITL and construction of irrigation and hydraulic structures in 1952)
- Tugachinsky ITL (Tugachlag; absorbed into Krasnoyarsky ITL in 1953)
- Tuimsky Mining Authority and ITL of Yeniseystroy (reorganized into Tsymskoe LO and subordinated to UITL "DS" of Yeniseistroy in 1951)
- Tuymazinsky ITL (Tuymazinlag; transferred to the UITLK of the MVD of the Bashkir ASSR in 1949)
- Tyrnov-Auzsky plant and ITL (Tyrnyauzstroy)

== U ==
- Ukhtinsko–Pechorsky ITL (UPITLag, Ukhtpechlag)
- Ukhta expedition OGPU (reorganized into Ukhtinsko-Pechorsky ITL in 1931)
- Ukhto–Izhemsky ITL (Ukhtoizhemsky ITL, Ukhtizhemlag, Ukhtoizhemlag; subdivisions transferred to Pechorsky ITL in 1955)
- Ulenskoe Mining Authority and ITL
- Ulminsky ITL (Ulminlag)
- Umaltinsky ITL (Umaltlag, Umaltynskoe Mining Administration of the NKVD)
- Unzhensky ITL (Unzhlag)
- Upper Izhma ITL
- Uralsky ITL (Urallag)
- Urgalsky ITL and construction GULZhDS (Urgallag)
- Usolsky ITL (Usollag)
- Usolsky ITL SGU (Uslag)
- Ust-Borovsky ITL
- Ust-Kutsky ITL and Dalstoy transshipment base (camp subdivision and production transferred to Angarsky ITL in 1953)
- Ust-Kutskoe LO
- Ust-Vymsky ITL OGPU
- Ustvymsky ITL (Ust-Vymsky ITL, Ustvymlag)

== V ==
- Vaninsky ITL of Dalstroy (Vaninlag, ITL and transshipment base in Vanino Bay, Vanino transit-forwarding camp of Dalstroy)
- Vaninsky transit and transfer camp (Vaninsky ITL)
- Varnavinsky ITL
- Vaygach expedition OGPU (Vaygachsky OLP)
- Verkne-Izhemsky ITL (Verkhizhemlag, Verkhneizhemlag)
- Verkne-Saldinsky ITL (never organized)
- Vershina–Darasun ITL
- Vetluzhsky ITL (Vetlag)
- Vishersky ITL (Vishlag, Viserlag)
- Vladivostoksky ITL (Directorate of Vladivostok ITL and colonies of Primorsky Krai, Vladlag)
- Vladivostok Transit Site of Dalstroy (ru:Владперпункт (Vladperpunkt, Владивосто́кский пересы́льный пу́нкт Дальстро́я), Vladivostok)
- Vodorazdelny Camp ("Watershed Camp", MVD Special Camp No. 12)
- Volga ITL of hydrosystem construction (Volgolag, Volgostroy)
- Volga ITL MVD (Volgolag, Volgostroy)
- Volga Railway ITL (Volgolag)
- Volga-Baltic ITL (see Volga–Baltic Waterway)
- Vorkutlag (Vorkuto-Pechora ITL, Vorkutpechlag, Vorkutinsky ITL, Vorkutstroy)
- Vostokno-Uralsky ITL (Vosturallag)
- Vostokny ITL in Construction 500
- Vostokny Railway ITL (Vostoklag, Vostlag)
- Voroninsky ITL (Voroninlag, Voroninskoe LO), Tomsk Oblast
- Vyazemsky ITL (Vyazemlag, Directorate of construction and Vyazemlaga GUShOSDOR)
- Vytegorsky ITL (Vytegorstroy, Vytegorlag; merged with Shekshinsky ITL into Volgo-Baltysky ITL in 1952)
- Vytegorsky ITL NKVD (Vytegorstroy, Vytegorlag)
- Vyartsilsky ITL (Vyartsillag, Vyartsilsky ITL and metallurgical plant)
- Vyatsky ITL (Vyatlag)

== W ==
- White Sea-Baltic ITL (Belomorsko-Baltiysky ITL, Belbaltlag, BBL), White Sea–Baltic Canal ITLs

== Y ==
- Yagrinsky ITL and construction 203 (Yagrinlag)
- Yansky Construction ITL (Yanstroylag)
- Yansky ITL of Dalstroy (Yanlag, ITL of the Yansky mining department, Yansky ITL USVITL, Yanskoe LO)
- Yansky Mining Directorate and ITL
- Yeniseysky ITL SGU (Yeniseylag)
- Yeniseysky ITL (Directorate of Yenisei labor camp and colonies, Yeniseylag)
- Yeniseysky ITL and construction 503 (Yeniseyzheldorlag)
- Yenskoe construction and ITL (Yenlag, ЕНСКОЕ СТРОИТЕЛЬСТВО И ИТЛ; Енлаг)
- Yermakovskoye LO (Ермаковское, Krasnoyarsk Krai; Yermakovlag)
- Yugo-Vostochny Railway ITL
- Yugo-Zapadnoe Mining Department and ITL of Yeniseystroy (reorganized into the Sorsk LO ITL "DS" in 1952)
- Yugo-Zapadny ITL Dalstroy (Southwest LO, Yuzlag, Southwest LO USVITL)
- Yuzhno-Kuzbassky ITL (Yuzhkuzbasslag)
- Yuzhny ITL at construction 505 GULZhDS (Ulan-Bator, MPR; Yuzhlag); one of a few Gulag camps outside the Soviet Union
- Yuzhny Railway ITL (Yuzhlag)
- Yugorsky ITL and construction 300 (Khanty–Mansia; Yugorlag, Construction 300)

== Z ==
Continued from the Polish complete listing of NKVD camps with Poles.

- Zaimandrovsky ITL (Zaimandrovskoe construction and ITL, Zaimandrovlag)
- Zapadny ITL (Zaplag, Zapadnoe GPU and ITL, Zapadny ITL USVITLa)
- Zapadny railway ITL (Western Railway ITL)
- Zapolyarny ITL and construction 301 (Zapolyarlag, Polyarny ITL)
- Zapolyarny ITL and construction 503 (Zapolyarlag, Construction 503)
- Zhigalovskoe LO
