= Novostepanovka =

Novostepanovka Новостепановка
- Selo
- Location within Amur Oblast Location within Russia
- Coordinates: 51°24′N 127°16′E
- Country: Russia
- Region: Amur Oblast
- District: Svobodnensky District
- Time zone: UTC+9:00 (CET)

Novostepanovka (Russian: Новостепановка) is a rural locality (a selo) in Klimoutsevsky Selsoviet of Svobodnensky District, Amur Oblast, Russia. The population is 219 as of 2018.

== Geography ==
The village is located on the Malaya Belaya River, 69 km north-west from Svobodny and 24 km from Klimoutsy.
