= Chembary =

Chembary Чембары
- Selo
- Location within Amur Oblast Location within Russia
- Coordinates: 51°39′N 128°09′E
- Country: Russia
- Region: Amur Oblast
- District: Svobodnensky District
- Time zone: UTC+9:00

Chembary (Russian: Чембары) is a rural locality (a selo) in Chernovsky Selsoviet of Svobodnensky District, Amur Oblast, Russia. The population was 366 as of 2018. There are 7 streets.

== Geography ==
Chembary is located on the left bank of the Bolshaya Pyora River, 38 km north of Svobodny (the district's administrative centre) by road. Chernovka is the nearest rural locality.
