= Sychovka =

Sychovka Сычёвка
- Selo
- Location within Amur Oblast Location within Russia
- Coordinates: 51°08′N 127°27′E
- Country: Russia
- Region: Amur Oblast
- District: Svobodnensky District
- Time zone: UTC+9:00

Sychovka (Russian: Сычёвка) is a rural locality (a selo) and the administrative center of Sychovsky Selsoviet of Svobodnensky District, Amur Oblast, Russia. The population was 582 as of 2018. There are 9 streets.

== Geography ==
Sychovka is located 67 km southwest of Svobodny (the district's administrative centre) by road. Zagornaya Selitba is the nearest rural locality.
