= Novonikolsk =

Novonikolsk Новоникольск
- Selo
- Location within Amur Oblast Location within Russia
- Coordinates: 51°36′N 128°38′E
- Country: Russia
- Region: Amur Oblast
- District: Svobodnensky District
- Time zone: UTC+9:00 (CET)

Novonikolsk (Russian: Новоникольск) is a rural locality (a selo) in Zheltoyarovsky Selsoviet of Svobodnensky District, Amur Oblast, Russia. The population is 55 as of 2018.

== Geography ==
The village is located 54 km north-east from Svobodny and 22 km from Zheltoyarovo.
