= Amurlag =

Amurlag (Russian abbreviation from Amursky lager, "Amur camp") may refer to one of the following Gulag labor camps in the area of the Amur River:

- Amurlag (1938–41), Amur railroad corrective labor camp
- Amurlag (1947–53), Amur corrective labor camp
