= Zagan, Amur Oblast =

Zagan Заган
- Selo
- Location within Amur Oblast Location within Russia
- Coordinates: 51°32′N 128°29′E
- Country: Russia
- Region: Amur Oblast
- District: Svobodnensky District
- Time zone: UTC+9:00

Zagan (Russian: Заган) is a rural locality (a selo) in Zheltoyarovsky Selsoviet of Svobodnensky District, Amur Oblast, Russia. The population was 100 as of 2018. There are 4 streets.

== Geography ==
Zagan is located on the right bank of the Zeya River, 42 km northeast of Svobodny (the district's administrative centre) by road. Zheltoyarovo is the nearest rural locality.
