= Maly Ergel =

Maly Ergel Малый Эргель
- Selo
- Location within Amur Oblast Location within Russia
- Coordinates: 51°16′N 127°41′E
- Country: Russia
- Region: Amur Oblast
- District: Svobodnensky District
- Time zone: UTC+9:00

Maly Ergel (Russian: Малый Эргель) is a rural locality (a selo) in Kostyukovsky Selsoviet of Svobodnensky District, Amur Oblast, Russia. The population was 29 as of 2018. There are 3 streets.

== Geography ==
Maly Ergel is located on the bank of the Maly Ergel River, 47 km west of Svobodny (the district's administrative centre) by road. Kostyukovka is the nearest rural locality.
