= Ust-Pyora =

Ust-Pyora Усть-Пёра
- Selo
- Location within Amur Oblast Location within Russia
- Coordinates: 51°26′N 128°08′E
- Country: Russia
- Region: Amur Oblast
- District: Svobodnensky District
- Time zone: UTC+9:00

Ust-Pyora (Russian: Усть-Пёра) is a rural locality (a selo) in Dmitriyevsky Selsoviet of Svobodnensky District, Amur Oblast, Russia. The population was 356 as of 2018. There are 10 streets.

== Geography ==
Ust-Pyora is located on the right bank of the Bolshaya Pyora River, 16 km north of Svobodny (the district's administrative centre) by road. Yukhta-3 is the nearest rural locality.
