= Novgorodka =

Novgorodka (Russian: Новгородка) is the name of several rural localities in Russia:

- Novgorodka, Amur Oblast, a selo in Novgorodsky Rural Settlement of Svobodnensky District of Amur Oblast
- Novgorodka, Pskov Oblast, a village in Pushkinogorsky District of Pskov Oblast
- Novgorodka, Tver Oblast, a village in Spirovsky District of Tver Oblast

Novgorodka is also the name of the coin minted in the Novgorod Republic in 15th century.

== See also ==
- Novgorod (disambiguation)
