= Markuchi =

Markuchi Маркучи
- Selo
- Location within Amur Oblast Location within Russia
- Coordinates: 51°34′N 127°42′E
- Country: Russia
- Region: Amur Oblast
- District: Svobodnensky District
- Time zone: UTC+9:00

Markuchi (Russian: Маркучи) is a rural locality (a selo) in Semenovsky Selsoviet of Svobodnensky District, Amur Oblast, Russia. The population was 206 as of 2018. There are 5 streets.

== Geography ==
Markuchi is located 43 km northwest of Svobodny (the district's administrative centre) by road. Semyonovka is the nearest rural locality.
