= Forced labor in the Soviet Union =

Forced labour was used extensively in the Soviet Union and the following categories may be distinguished.

== Obligatory labour in early Soviet Russia ==
The Bolshevik government began centralizing labor policies and restructuring workforce regulations, which limited the choice to work and also limited options of employment and assignments. In July 1918, the Russian Constitution implemented the Obligatory Labour Service to help support the Russian economy, which became effective immediately. In 1919, the Russian Labor Code laid out the exemptions for the elderly as well as pregnant women. It also stated that workers would be given the choice to work in their trades, if the option was available.

If the option was not available, workers would be required to accept the work that was available. Wages became fixed in 1917 by the Supreme Counsel of Popular Economy, and the work day was set to be eight hours. However, a worker and their employer could agree upon overtime, laying out conditions for voluntary work, which were to be done over the weekend. Women and children were exceptions and thus, specific conditions were laid out for them. At the end of 1919 and in early 1920, militarisation of labour was introduced, promoted by Trotsky with the support of Lenin.

== The Soviet Gulag system ==
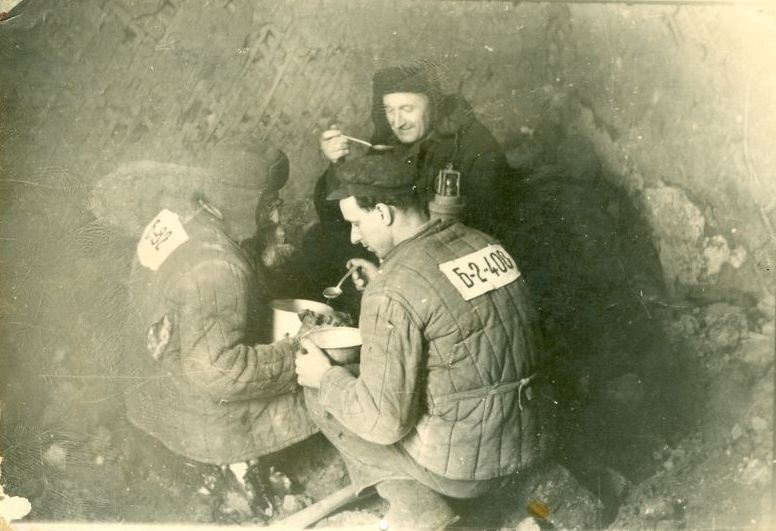
Political prisoners in the Gulag

Gulag or Glavnoye Upravleniye Lagerej was a system of forced labor camps in the Soviet Union.

The Gulag penal system was restricted, with little to no communication between different camps, and were not discussed in the wider Soviet society. As a result, each camp developed its own culture and set of rules, each functioning as distinct communities. While the early years of the Gulag were brutal and violent, conditions later stabilized, and the camps began to operate in a more structured manner. In some cases, camp commandants took on roles similar to local administrators, occasionally advocating for improved conditions and supplies for those in their charge. In 1972, Gulag survivor Avraham Shifrin testified to Congress:

In 1953, 1954, it was awful conditions in concentration camps. It is hard to explain how bad it was... [S]uch bad food that when I came to the concentration camp, I have seen prisoners which have only bones and skin. Each day in our concentration camp, I do not remember a day when it was less than 20, 25 people—less than 35—which died from starvation.

In the Soviet penal system there were different types of detentions, including: prisons, special prisons, special camps, and corrective labor colonies. There were also scientific prison institutes (sharashkas), internment camps and prisoner of war (POW) camps.

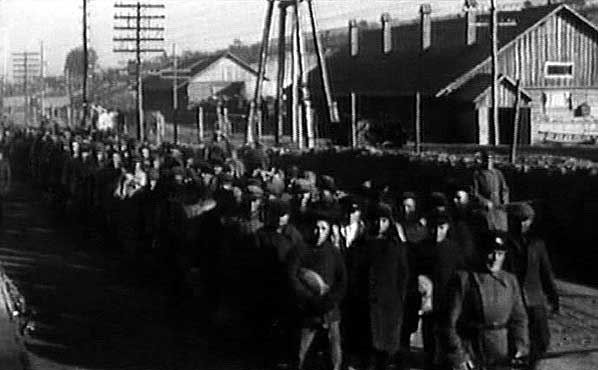
Gulag prisoners building the Moskva-Volga canal

About 20% of the prisoners were freed each year from the Gulags. These prisoners were usually either too weak to perform duties any longer or suffered from incurable diseases. Types of prisoners ranged from petty criminals to political prisoners. A 1993 study of the Soviet archives revealed that between 14 and 18 million people were imprisoned in the Gulag labor camps from 1929 to 1953. 10 to 11 million people were also either deported or were already in the penal system at the time. There are no accurate or official archive records before 1929.

It is estimated that 1.6 million people died in the Gulags, around 800,000 at the hands of the Soviet secret police, and another million during the exile process after they had been released from the Gulag.

The official party stated that the Gulags were used to rehabilitate prisoners. However, the truthful intent was to put prisoners to labor in order to achieve the goals of the Five Year Plan, as well as to provide labor for State-run projects such as the Moscow-Volga canal. There is no doubt the camps were meant to house criminals and misfits who were a danger to society, but many of the prisoners were subjects of political persecution. This was due to Stalin's view on opposition politics.

Forced labour was instrumental for the Soviet Union, and during the time of industrialisation it was deemed a necessary tool by the Bolsheviks, in order to rid the country of internal enemies, while at the same time using that labour to help achieve a stronger socialist union, and that idea was no different during wartime.

The USSR implemented a series of “labor disciplinary measures” due to the lack of productivity of its labour force in the early 1930s. 1.8 million workers were sentenced to 6 months in forced labor with a quarter of their original pay, 3.3 million faced sanctions, and 60k were imprisoned for absentees in 1940 alone. The conditions of Soviet workers worsened in WW2 as 1.3 million were punished in 1942, and 1 million each were punished in subsequent 1943 and 1944 with the reduction of 25% of food rations. Furthermore, 460 thousand were imprisoned throughout these years.

In the late 1940s, the use of unpaid forced labor in the construction of megaprojects such as canals became increasingly controversial among the Soviet government, as it was observed that the lack of incentives and the harsh conditions actually made the laborers less productive. After a written criticism by an inmate, which described prison labor as "wasted", reached the Central Committee, many heads of MVD production branches requested permission to pay a partial wage to prisoners. This culminated in a March 1950 decree from the government that proclaimed a form of payment had to be universally introduced in the correctional labor camps, except those that held "especially dangerous" inmates.

== Post-Gulag ==
The institution called Gulag was closed by the MVD order No 020 of January 25, 1960.

After the dismantling of Gulag, forced labor still continued to be a form of punishment in the form of corrective labor camps and corrective labor colony. In 1987, the CIA estimated that 4.5 million Soviet citizens were engaged in forced labor, constituting 3% of total labor force, an increase from the 1977 estimate of 4 million.

== Foreign forced labour ==
In July 1937, when it appeared that war was imminent, Stalin ordered the removal of Germans from Soviet soil on the grounds that they were working for the enemy. An order by the NKVD also stated that German workers were agents of the Gestapo, sent to sabotage Soviet efforts. Of the 68,000 arrests and 42,000 deaths that resulted, only a third were actually German; the remainder were of other nationalities.

Just a month later, the liquidation of Poles was also approved by the Politburo. In 1938, 11,000 people were arrested in Mongolia, most of them lamas. Many other nationalities were swept up in similar operations, including but not exclusive to: Latvians, Estonians, Romanians, Greeks, Afghans, and Iranians. Those that were arrested were either shot or placed in the forced labour system. Americans that had come to the Soviet Union seeking work during the Great Depression found themselves pleading the American embassy for passports so that they could return to their home country. The embassy refused to issue new passports and the emigrants were arrested and sent to prison, Gulag camps, or executed.

The UPV camp system, separate from the Gulag, was established in 1939 to utilize POWs and foreign civilians for labor. It eventually included several hundred camps and thousands of auxiliary camps which held millions of foreign prisoners during their years of operation. The camps were not uniform in the ways they treated and provided for prisoners but, in general, conditions were harsh and could be deadly. Work days were usually 10–14 hours long and camps were often marked by unsafe work conditions, insufficient food and clothing, and limited access to medical care.

The Soviet Union did not sign the Geneva Conventions and so were not obligated to adhere to its stipulations concerning prisoners of war. The Soviet Union retained POWs after other countries had released their prisoners, only beginning to do so after Stalin's death in 1953. The remainder of prisoners were released in 1956 to build diplomatic relations with West Germany.

== Casualties ==
Forced labour in the Soviet Union has been identified as one of the largest democides in history, with estimates ranging from millions to tens of millions dead, similar to the collective Chinese democides and the systematic genocidal killing by Nazi Germany. See Gulag § Death toll for details.

== See also ==
- Katorga, penal labor in the Russian Empire
- The kolkhoz system
