= Yakovlevo, Cherepovetsky District, Vologda Oblast =

Yakovlevo Яковлево
- Village
- Location within Vologda Oblast Location within Russia
- Coordinates: 58°57′N 38°26′E
- Country: Russia
- Region: Vologda Oblast
- District: Cherepovetsky District
- Time zone: UTC+3:00

Yakovlevo (Russian: Яковлево) is a rural locality (a village) in Yugskoye Rural Settlement, Cherepovetsky District, Vologda Oblast, Russia. The population was 15 as of 2002.

== Geography ==
Yakovlevo is located 45 km southeast of Cherepovets (the district's administrative centre) by road. Ryabovo is the nearest rural locality.
