= Klimoutsy =

Klimoutsy Климоуцы
- Selo
- Location within Amur Oblast Location within Russia
- Coordinates: 51°28′N 127°36′E
- Country: Russia
- Region: Amur Oblast
- District: Svobodnensky District
- Time zone: UTC+9:00

Klimoutsy (Russian: Климоуцы) is a rural locality (a selo) in Klimoutsevsky Selsoviet of Svobodnensky District, Amur Oblast, Russia. The population was 736 as of 2018. There are 9 streets.

== Geography ==
Klimoutsy is located on the bank of the Lono River, 51 km northwest of Svobodny (the district's administrative centre) by road. Semyonovka is the nearest rural locality.
