= Correctional labour camp =

Soviet penitentiary institution

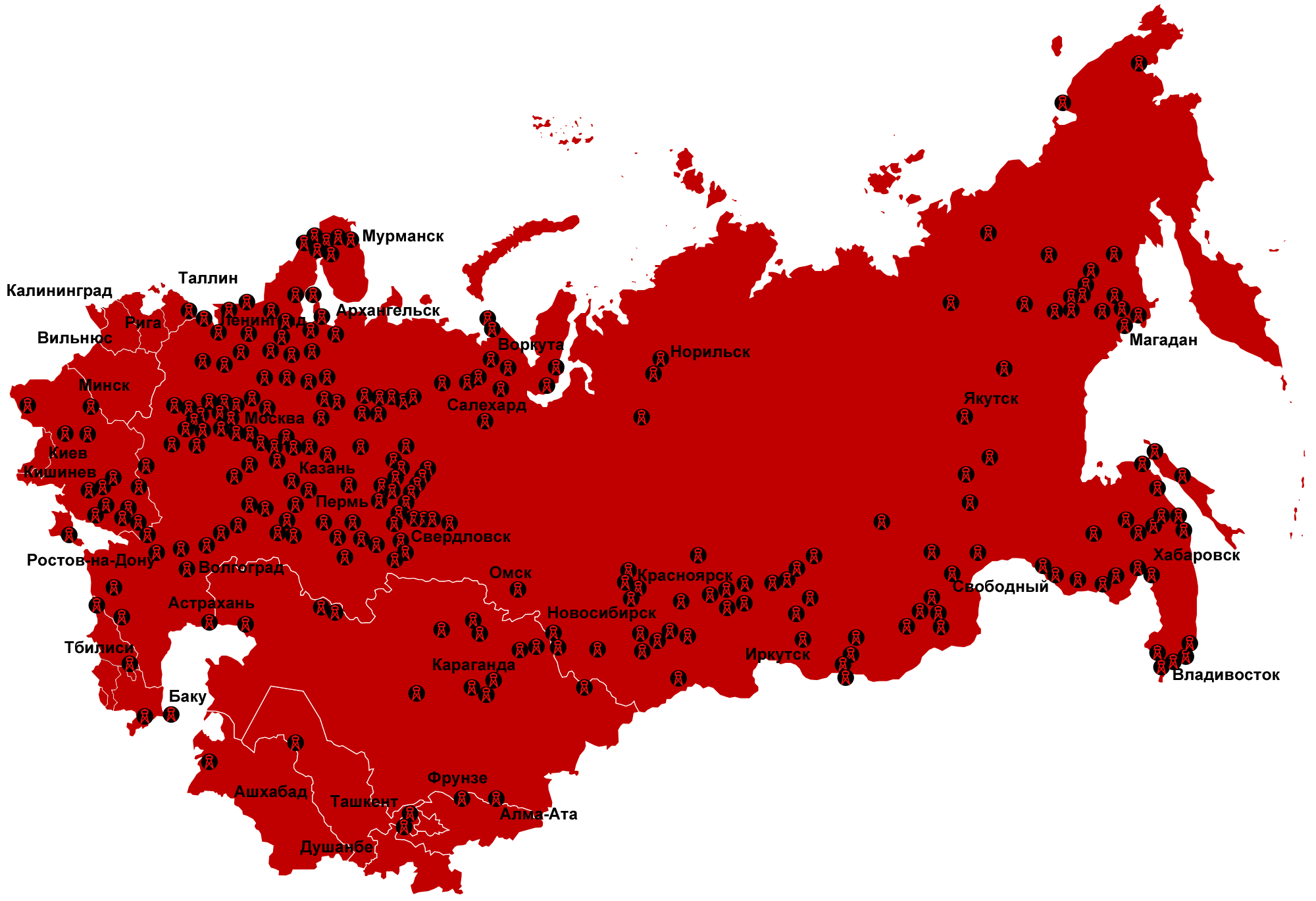
Integral map of the camps of the system of the Main Administration of Camps that existed from 1923 to 1967, based on data from the human rights society "Memorial"

Correctional labour camps (Russian: исправительно–трудовой лагерь) were penal labour camps in the Soviet Union.

== Background ==
In the Russian Empire, by 1917, most prisons were subordinate to the Main Prison Administration of the Ministry of Justice, which worked in conjunction with the provincial bodies of the Ministry of Internal Affairs. After the February Revolution of 1917, a wide amnesty took place, the number of prisoners in September 1917 was just over 34,000, while the pre–revolutionary maximum in 1912 was 184,000; by 1916, as a result of the mass recruitment of young men into the army, the number of prisoners had dropped to 142,000.

The Main Prison Administration was renamed the Main Administration of Places of Detention, with prison inspections in the field, over which the center was rapidly losing control. After the October Revolution, this department passed under the People's Commissariat of Justice, created to replace the ministry of the same name. Since the new leadership did not trust the old cadres, control over the correctional institutions continued to weaken, moreover, many territories of the former Russian Empire fell from the center's jurisdiction.

In April 1918, the Main Administration of Places of Detention was dissolved and replaced by the Central Punitive Department, which in July 1918 published the "Temporary Instruction of the People's Commissariat of Justice" on the creation of a new system of places of detention. It had to be based on two principles:

- Self–sufficiency (income from prison labour must cover the government's expenses for maintaining places of detention);
- Complete re-education of prisoners.

== Soviet history ==
Starting with the Soviet Russia, there were five types of forced labour camps: special purpose camps, general concentration camps, production camps, prisoner of war camps, and distribution camps. However, in the documents of the People's Commissariat of Internal Affairs, the terms "forced labour camp" and "concentration camp" were often used interchangeably; there is also the name "concentration labour camps", so most likely this division into types was largely formal. In addition, when necessary (for example, when the Tambov Uprising was suppressed), temporary field camps were organized.

The term "corrective labour camp" was introduced in the Soviet Union on June 27, 1929 at a meeting of the Political Bureau of the Central Committee of the All–Union Communist Party (Bolsheviks).

On July 11, 1929, by a resolution of the Council of People's Commissars of the Soviet Union "On the Use of Labour of Criminal Prisoners", two parallel structures of places of deprivation of liberty were created: under the jurisdiction of the United State Political Administration of the Soviet Union and under the jurisdiction of the republican People's Commissariats of Internal Affairs. The basis of the first structure was made up of correctional labour camps for those sentenced to imprisonment for a term of more than three years, and the second structure included places of imprisonment for persons sentenced to a term of up to three years, for the maintenance of which it was necessary to organize agricultural and industrial colonies (correctional labour colonies).

Eventually the Soviet system of punitive labor evolved into the system of Gulag forced labour camps.

According to the decree of the Central Committee of the Communist Party of the Soviet Union and the Council of Ministers of the Soviet Union 1443–719c of October 25, 1956, all correctional labour camps of the Ministry of Internal Affairs of the Soviet Union were to be transferred to the subordination of the Ministries of Internal Affairs of the Union Republics and subsequently reorganized into correctional labour colonies.

Prisoners of correctional labour camps took part in the construction of canals, roads, industrial and other facilities in the Far North, Far East and other regions on a massive scale.

== See also ==
- Corrective labor colony
- Forced labor in the Soviet Union
- List of camps of the Main Administration of Camps

== Sources ==
- The System of Correctional Labour Camps in the Soviet Union, 1923–1960: Directory / Society "Memorial". State Archive of the Russian Federation. Compiled by Mikhail Smirnov. Edited by Nikita Okhotin, Arseny Roginsky – Moscow: Links, 1998 – 600 Pages, Pictures – 2,000 Copies – ISBN 5-7870-0022-6
- Ivan Solonevich. Russia in a Concentration Camp / Compiled by Kirill Chistyakov – Moscow: RIMIS Publishing House, 2005 – 536 pages – ISBN 5-9650-0031-6; ISBN 978-5-9650-0031-9
- Khava Volovich. New Camps
- Willie Muntaniol. Prizes to the Prisoners for the Execution of the "Labour Army"
