= Novgorodka, Amur Oblast =

Novgorodka Новгородка
- Selo
- Location within Amur Oblast Location within Russia
- Coordinates: 51°14′N 128°06′E
- Country: Russia
- Region: Amur Oblast
- District: Svobodnensky District
- Time zone: UTC+9:00 (CET)

Novgorodka (Russian: Новгородка) is a rural locality (a selo) and the administrative center of Novgorodsky Selsoviet of Svobodnensky District, Amur Oblast, Russia. The population is 749 as of 2018.

== Geography ==
The village is located 10 km from Svobodny.
