= Ryabovo =

Ryabovo (Russian: Рябово) is the name of several inhabited localities in Russia.

Urban localities

- Ryabovo, Tosnensky District, Leningrad Oblast, an urban-type settlement under the administrative jurisdiction of Ryabovskoye Settlement Municipal Formation in Tosnensky District of Leningrad Oblast; 59°25′N 31°9′E

Rural localities

- Ryabovo, Kargopolsky District, Arkhangelsk Oblast, a village in Pechnikovsky Selsoviet of Kargopolsky District in Arkhangelsk Oblast
- Ryabovo, Lensky District, Arkhangelsk Oblast, a village in Ryabovsky Selsoviet of Lensky District in Arkhangelsk Oblast
- Ryabovo, Lukhsky District, Ivanovo Oblast, a selo in Lukhsky District of Ivanovo Oblast
- Ryabovo, Puchezhsky District, Ivanovo Oblast, a village in Puchezhsky District of Ivanovo Oblast
- Ryabovo, Kirov Oblast, a selo in Mukhinsky Rural Okrug of Zuyevsky District in Kirov Oblast; 58°12′N 50°48′E
- Ryabovo, Vyborgsky District, Leningrad Oblast, a settlement under the administrative jurisdiction of Primorskoye Settlement Municipal Formation in Vyborgsky District of Leningrad Oblast; 60°21′N 28°59′E
- Ryabovo, Nizhny Novgorod Oblast, a village in Gorevsky Selsoviet of Koverninsky District in Nizhny Novgorod Oblast; 57°20′N 44°3′E
- Ryabovo, Novgorod Oblast, a village in Togodskoye Settlement of Kholmsky District in Novgorod Oblast
- Ryabovo, Gdovsky District, Pskov Oblast, a village in Gdovsky District of Pskov Oblast
- Ryabovo, Kunyinsky District, Pskov Oblast, a village in Kunyinsky District of Pskov Oblast
- Ryabovo, Ostrovsky District, Pskov Oblast, a village in Ostrovsky District of Pskov Oblast
- Ryabovo, Pskovsky District, Pskov Oblast, a village in Pskovsky District of Pskov Oblast
- Ryabovo, Kalyazinsky District, Tver Oblast, a village in Starobislovskoye Rural Settlement of Kalyazinsky District in Tver Oblast
- Ryabovo, Selizharovsky District, Tver Oblast, a village in Yeletskoye Rural Settlement of Selizharovsky District in Tver Oblast
- Ryabovo, Tyumen Oblast, a selo in Ryabovsky Rural Okrug of Vikulovsky District in Tyumen Oblast
- Ryabovo, Krasnogorsky District, Udmurt Republic, a village in Agrikolsky Selsoviet of Krasnogorsky District in the Udmurt Republic
- Ryabovo (selo), Uvinsky District, Udmurt Republic, a selo in Uva-Tuklinsky Selsoviet of Uvinsky District in the Udmurt Republic
- Ryabovo (village), Uvinsky District, Udmurt Republic, a village in Uva-Tuklinsky Selsoviet of Uvinsky District in the Udmurt Republic
- Ryabovo, Belozersky District, Vologda Oblast, a village in Gulinsky Selsoviet of Belozersky District in Vologda Oblast
- Ryabovo, Cherepovetsky District, Vologda Oblast, a village in Batransky Selsoviet of Cherepovetsky District in Vologda Oblast
