= Japanese prisoners of war in the Soviet Union =

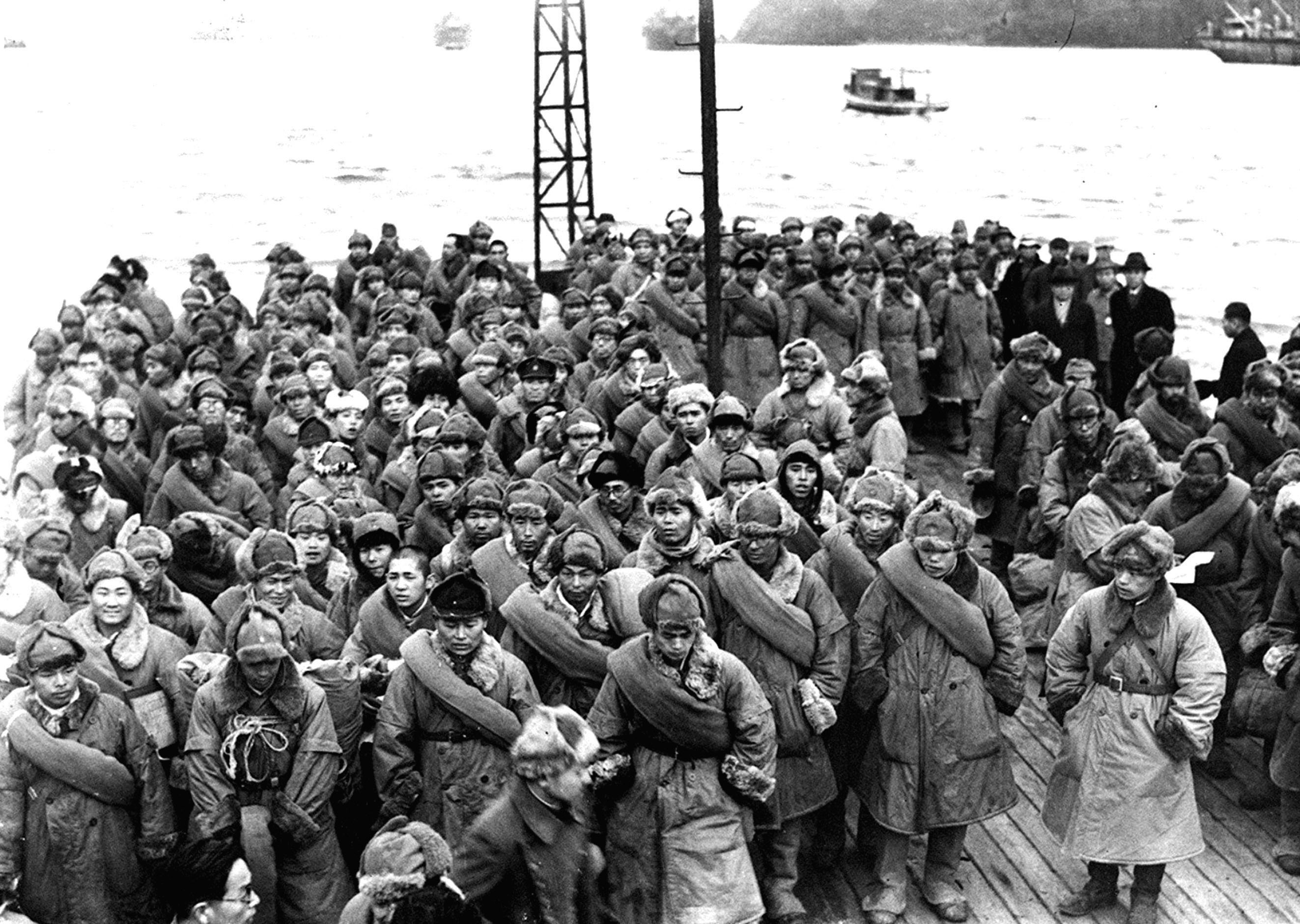
Repatriated Japanese soldiers returning from Siberia wait to disembark from a ship at Maizuru, Kyoto Prefecture, Japan, in 1946

After World War II Japanese personnel in the Soviet Union and Mongolia were interned to work in labor camps as POWs. Estimates for their number vary, from 560,000–760,000 to 900,000. Of them, it is estimated that between 60,000, 200,000-300,000 or 347,000 died in captivity.

The majority of the approximately 3.5 million Japanese armed forces outside Japan were disarmed by the United States and Kuomintang China and repatriated in 1946. Western Allies had taken 35,000 Japanese prisoners between December 1941 and 15 August 1945, i.e., before the Japanese capitulation. The Soviet Union held the Japanese POWs in a much longer time period and used them as a labor force.

Soviet Union behavior was contrary to the Soviet–Japanese Neutrality Pact from the beginning, and also to the Potsdam Declaration, which guaranteed the return of surrendered Japanese soldiers to Japan. When Russian president Boris Yeltsin arrived in Japan in October 1993, he apologized for it being an "inhumane act."

However, the Russian side said, "The transferred Japanese soldiers are" prisoners of war "who were legally detained during the battle and do not fall into the category of" detainees "who were unfairly detained after the end of the war."

== History ==
After the defeat of the Kwantung Army in Manchuria, Japanese POWs were sent from Manchuria, Korea, South Sakhalin and Kuril Islands to Primorski Krai, Khabarovsk Krai, Krasnoyarsk Krai, Kazakhstan (South Kazakhstan Province and Zhambyl Province), Buryat-Mongol ASSR, and Uzbek SSR. In 1946, 49 labor camps for Japanese POWs under the management of GUPVI housed about 500,000 persons. In addition there were two camps for those convicted of various crimes. Prisoners were grouped into 1,000 person units. Some male and female Japanese civilians, as well as Koreans were also imprisoned when there were not enough soldiers to fill a unit.

Handling of Japanese POWs was considered inhumane and mishandled by Russia. There were deaths caused by malnutrition, overwork, cave-ins, floods, unsanitary working conditions which led to epidemics, harsh winter colds, violent guards, brutal suppression of mild resistance, and even lynchings of Japanese by their fellow Japanese.

A significant number of Japanese were assigned to the construction of the Baikal-Amur Mainline (over 200,000 persons), in eight camps, in Komsomolsk-on-Amur (two camps, for two railroad branches), Sovetskaya Gavan, Raychikha railroad station (Khabarovsk Krai), Izvestkovaya railroad station (Khabarovsk Krai), Krasnaya Zarya (Chita Oblast), Taishet, and Novo-Grishino (Irkutsk Oblast).

The repatriation of Japanese POWs started in 1946:

year	number released	notes
1946	18,616	
1947	166,240	
1948	175,000	
1949	97,000	971 transferred to PRC
1950	1,585	leaving 2,988 remaining in USSR

Beginning in 1949, there were reports of returnees being uncooperative and hostile upon returning to Japan, owing to Communist propaganda they had been subject to during their imprisonment. These incidents resulted in the Japanese public gaining a more negative perception of the returning soldiers, and increased SCAP's hostility towards the left-wing in Japan.

Those remaining after 1950 were detained having been convicted of various crimes. Their release continued from 1953 under various amnesties. Following the death of Josef Stalin and the subsequent Khruschev Thaw, the Soviet attitude towards the remaining Japanese prisoners changed significantly. Accompanied by Soviet officials, they were taken on tours of cities and allowed to purchase gifts for their families. Prior to repatriation, a banquet in Khabarovsk hosted by Nikolai Gagen was attended by high-ranking prisoners such as Jun Ushiroku. The last major group of 1,025 Japanese POWs was released on 23 December 1956.

From then on, some Japanese POWs were released in small groups, including those who would only return in the 1990s following the collapse of the Soviet Union. Some Japanese prisoners who had been held for decades, who by this point had married and had started families, elected not to permanently return to Japan.

There are about 60 associations of Japanese former internees and members of their families today. The Soviet Union did not provide the lists of POWs and did not allow the relatives of those POWs who died in captivity to visit their burial sites. This became possible after the dissolution of the Soviet Union.

== Japanese internees and Russians ==
NOTE 1. ☉ Large Circles with heavy outline (numbered in red): Over 20,000 detained. ● Black circles (numbered in blue): Over 10,000. ○White. ☉ small circles (numbered in black): Less than 10,000. △ Triangles (numbered in Green): Small number. NOTE 2. The above-designated graphic symbols show the principal area of the labor camp location. Created by combining two maps, published by the former Ministry of Health and Welfare and the current Ministry of Labor, Health and Welfare of the Japanese Government: 1) Kôseishô engokyoku [Bureau of Assistance, Ministry of Health and Welfare]. Hikiage to engo sanjûnen no ayumi [Thirty-year progress of the repatriation and assistance]. Kôseishô. 1977. p. 56. 2) Kôseishô shakai/engokyoku engo gojûnenshi henshû iinkai [Editorial Committee of Fifty-year history of assistance. Bureau of Social/Assistance, Ministry of Health and Welfare]. Engo gojûnenshi [Fifty-year history of assistance]. Gyôsei. 1997. pp. 524–525. Location names, listed originally in katakana-Japanese, have been transcribed into English using five maps published in the U.S.A., U.K., and USSR. A) Union of Soviet Socialist Republic. Compiled and drawn in the Cartographic Section of the National Geographic Society for the National Geographic Magazine. Grovesnor, Gilbert. Washington. U.S.A. 1944. B) U.S.S.R.and Adjacent Areas 1:8,000,000. Published by Department of Survey, Ministry of Defense, U.K. British Crown Copyright Reserved Series 5104. U.K. 1964. C) USSR Railways. J.R. Yonge. The Quail Map Company. Exeter. U. K. 1973. D) USSR Railways. J.R. Yonge. The Quail Map Company. Exeter. U.K. 1976. E) Soviet Union. Produced by the Cartographic Division. National Geographic Society. National Geographic Magazine. Grovesnor, Melville. Washington. U.S.A. 1976. F) Union of Soviet Socialist Republic. Moscow News Supplement. Main Administration of Geodesy and Cartography under the Council of Minister of the USSR. U.S.S.R. 1979.

Historian S. Kuznetsov, dean of the Department of History of the Irkutsk State University, one of the first researchers of the topic, interviewed thousands of former internees and came to the following conclusion:

"Siberian Internment" (the Japanese term) was a unique and paradoxical phenomenon. Many of them have nostalgic and sentimental recollection of this period of their life. In their memoirs and recollections they drew a distinction between the attitude of the Soviet state machine and ordinary Russian people. Unlike Germans, Japanese were not associated in the perception of Russians with Nazi atrocities in the Russian land, although initially the attitude of Russians was hostile, under the influence of Soviet propaganda. What is more, romantic relations between Japanese internees and Russian women were not uncommon. For example, in the city of Kansk, Krasnoyarsk Krai, about 50 Japanese married locals and stayed. Japanese noticed the overall poverty of the Russian population. They also met Soviet political prisoners in the GULAG prison camps abundant in Siberia at the time, and acquired a good understanding of the Soviet system. All of them recall the ideological indoctrination during the compulsory daily "studies of democracy", however only a very small number of them embraced communism.

However, many of the inmates do not share Kuznetsov's views and retain negative memories of being robbed of personal property, and the brutality of camp personnel, harsh winters and exhausting labor. One of these critics is Haruo Minami who later became one of the most famous singers in Japan. Minami, because of his harsh experiences in the labor camp, became a well-known anti-communist.

Most Japanese were captured in Soviet-occupied Manchuria (northeast China) and were taken to Soviet POW camps. Many Japanese died while they were detained in the POW camps; estimates of the number of these deaths vary from 60,000, based on deaths certified by the USSR, to 347,000 (the estimate of American historian William F. Nimmo, including 254,000 dead and 93,000 missing), based on the number of Japanese servicemen and civilian auxiliaries registered in Manchuria at the time of surrender who failed to return to Japan subsequently. Some remained in captivity until December 1956 (11 years after the war) before they were allowed to return to Japan. The wide disparity between Soviet records of death and the number of Japanese missing under Soviet occupation, as well as the whereabouts of the remains of POWs, are still grounds of political and diplomatic contention, at least on the Japanese side.

According to the map formulated by combining two maps, published by the former Ministry of Health and Welfare and the current Ministry of Labor, Health and Welfare of the Japanese Government, there were more than 70 labor camps for the Japanese prisoners of war within the Soviet Union:

Because of the difficulty in retrieving formal USSR Government records, the numerical data are based on reports obtained from former POWs and elsewhere by the former Ministry of Health and Welfare and the current Ministry of Labor, Health and Welfare of the Japanese Government. The Japanese Government is disinterring the remains of the Japanese POWs who died in the USSR; more data may be anticipated, for example, at sites such as "シベリア抑留中死亡者に関する資料の調査について" [Investigation of records regarding persons deceased during detention in Siberia]. Ministry of Labor, Health and Welfare Policy Reports. 2009.

== Japanese ex-internees today ==
Various associations of former internees seek compensation for their wartime treatment and for pensions from the Japanese government. An appeal to the Commission on Human Rights says

Japan had a moral and legal responsibility to compensate the victims of its aggression, yet the Japanese Government had so far refused to provide compensation to former prisoners of war for their period of forced labour in Siberia, although it had made concessions to prisoners from other regions. The veterans had sued the Japanese Government in 1981 for compensation and had eventually been issued with labour certificates by the Russian Government, as requested by the court, but their appeal had been rejected.

— 56th session record of the Economic and Social Council of the UN Commission on Human Rights 13 April 2000

Those who chose to stay in Russia and eventually decided to return had to deal with significant Japanese bureaucracy. A major problem is the difficulty in providing the documentary confirmation of their status. Toshimasa Meguro, a 77-year-old former POW, was permitted to visit Japan as late as in 1998. He served eight years in labor camps and after his release, he was ordered to stay in Siberia.

Tetsuro Ahiko was the last remaining Japanese POW living in Kazakhstan prior to his death in 2020.

== Research in Russia ==
Research into the history of the Japanese POWs has become possible in Russia only since the second half of the 1980s, with glasnost and the dissolution of the Soviet Union. Until this time the only public information about any World War II POWs taken by the Soviet Union was some numbers of prisoners taken. After opening the secret Soviet archives the true scope of the POW labor in the Soviet Union has become known, and the topic has been discussed in the press.

Japanese POWs have become the subject of the historians of Siberia and the Russian Far East, who gained access to local archives of NKVD/MVD and CPSU A number of kandidat (PhD) dissertations had been presented about Soviet POW in various regions. In 2000 a fundamental collection of documents related to POWs in the USSR was published, which contained significant information about Japanese.

In the 2000s, several books about Japanese POWs were published in Russia.

About 2,000 memoirs of Japanese POWs in the Soviet Union have been published in Japan.

At least one memoir of a Japanese POW in the Soviet Union has been published in English.

== Legacy ==
In 2015, records of the internment and repatriation were registered as a UNESCO Memory of the World under the title "Return to Maizuru Port—Documents Related to the Internment and Repatriation Experiences of Japanese (1945–1956)".

== In fiction ==
The Japanese novelist Toyoko Yamasaki wrote the 1976 novel Fumō Chitai, about an Imperial Army staff officer captured in Manchuria, his captivity and return to Japan to become a businessman. This has been made into a film and two television dramas.

A dramatisation of experiences as a Soviet POW form a portion of the latter part of the epic movie trilogy, The Human Condition, by Masaki Kobayashi.

Kiuchi Nobuo reported his experiences about Soviet camps in his The Notes of Japanese soldier in USSR online comic series.

The 2011 South Korean movie My Way also shows the treatment of Japanese and Japanese-recruited Koreans in Soviet POW camps.

== See also ==
- Japanese prisoners of war in World War II
- Japanese Surrendered Personnel
- Soviet invasion of Manchuria
- Japanese people in Russia
- German prisoners of war in the Soviet Union
- Italian prisoners of war in the Soviet Union
- Prisoners of war in World War II
- Romanian prisoners of war in the Soviet Union
- Finnish prisoners of war in the Soviet Union
