= Ryabovo, Lukhsky District, Ivanovo Oblast =

Ryabovo Рябово
- Village
- Location within Ivanovo Oblast Location within Russia
- Coordinates: 56°55′N 42°12′E
- Country: Russia
- Region: Ivanovo Oblast
- District: Lukhsky District
- Time zone: UTC+3:00

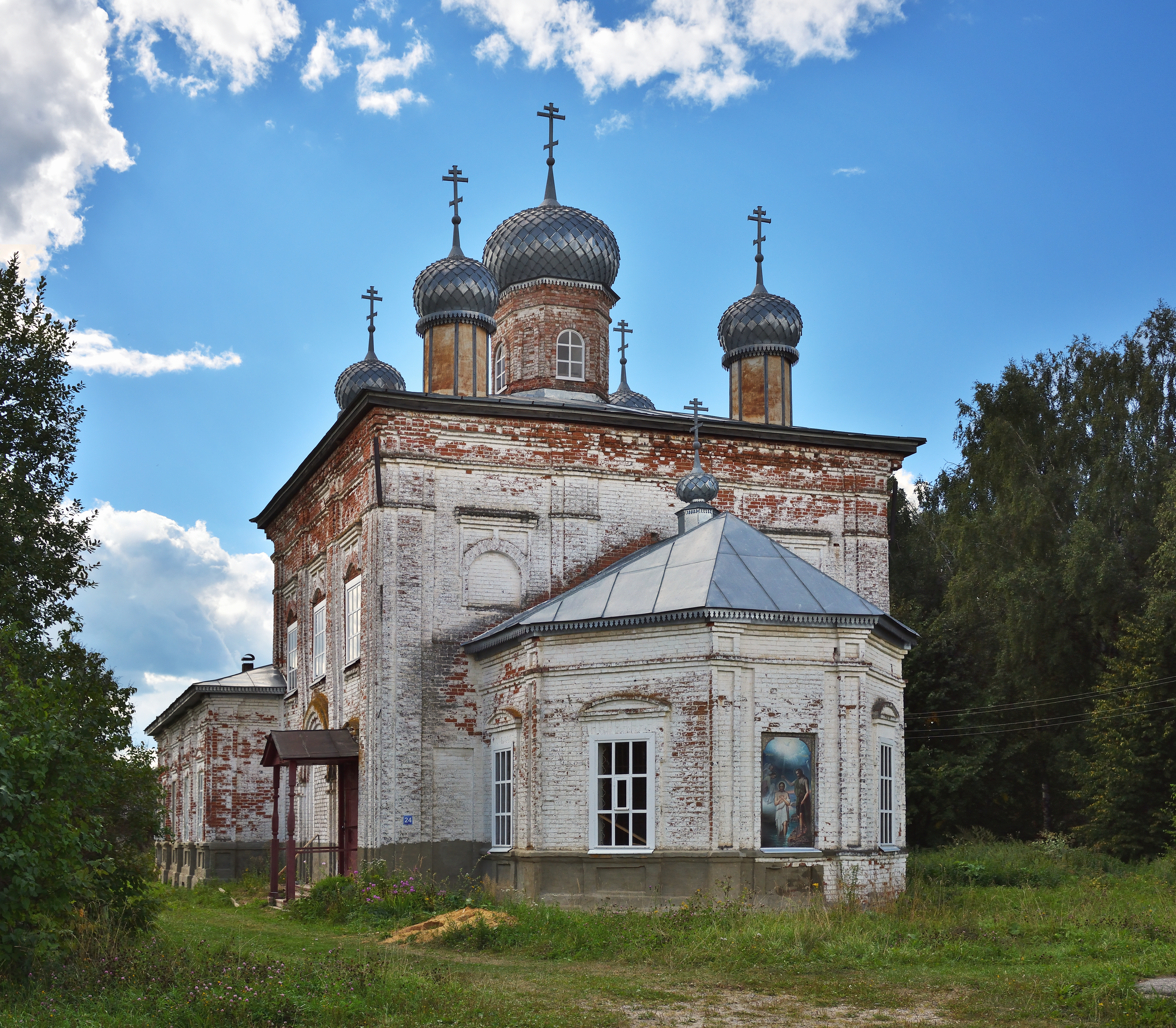
Epiphany Church in Ryabovo, Lukhsky District, Ivanovo oblast, Russia

Ryabovo (Russian: Рябово) is a rural locality (a selo) in Lukhsky District, Ivanovo Oblast, Russia. Population: 414 (2010 census);

== Geography ==
This rural locality is located 10 kilometres (6.2 mi) from Lukh (the district's administrative centre), 76 kilometres (47 mi) from Ivanovo (capital of Ivanovo Oblast) and 308 kilometres (191 mi) from Moscow. Novosyolki is the nearest rural locality.
