= Amurlag (1947–1953) =

Amur Corrective Labor Camp (Amurlag) (Russian: Амурский исправительно-трудовой лагерь, Амурлаг) was a subdivision of GULAG which existed during 1947-1953 Its administration was headquartered in the settlement of Svobodny, Amur Oblast. Its main activities were coal mining, gold mining, railroad construction, construction, and lumber works. Its headcount was up to over 3,000 (1951).

== See also ==
- Amurlag (1938–1941)
