= Varnavino =

Varnavino (Russian: Варнавино) is the name of several urban and rural inhabited localities (urban-type settlements, work settlements, and villages) in Russia.

Urban localities

- Varnavino, Nizhny Novgorod Oblast, a work settlement in Varnavinsky District of Nizhny Novgorod Oblast

Rural localities

- Varnavino, Arkhangelsk Oblast, a village in Udimsky Selsoviet of Kotlassky District of Arkhangelsk Oblast
- Varnavino, Smolensk Oblast, a village in Shapovskoye Rural Settlement of Demidovsky District of Smolensk Oblast
- Varnavino, Vologda Oblast, a village in Timanovsky Selsoviet of Babushkinsky District of Vologda Oblast
