= POW labor in the Soviet Union =

Systematic POW labor in the Soviet Union is associated primarily with the outcomes of World War II and covers the period of 1939–1956, from the official formation of the first POW camps, to the repatriation of the last POWs, from the Kwantung Army.

This form of forced labor was handled by the Chief Directorate for Prisoners of War and Internees Affairs (Главное управление по делам военнопленных и интернированных, ГУПВИ, transliterated as GUPVI) of the NKVD, established in 1939 (initially as the "Directorate for Prisoners' Affairs", управление по делам военнопленных) according to the NKVD Order no. 0308 "On the Organization of POW Camps" to handle Polish POWs after the Soviet Invasion of Poland. The first POW camps were formed in the European part of the USSR.

By the end of World War II, the Soviet Union amassed a huge number of German and Japanese and other Axis powers POW, estimated over 5 million(of which estimated 15% died in captivity), as well as interned German civilians used as part of the reparations.

The POW and internees were handled by 24 frontline camps, 72 transit camps, over 500 labor camps and "special camps", 421 "worker battalions" (рабочий батальон), 214 "special hospitals", and 322 camps for handling of repatriation, over the whole territory of the Soviet Union. Many POWs were used for the reconstruction of cities damaged by the Wehrmacht during World War II. Forced labor from these people was also involved in new construction, such as for the Navoi Theater in Tashkent.

In 2000 a collection of Soviet archived documents related to POWs in the Soviet union was published in Russia, with an introduction, map of POW camps, and comments.

== See also ==
- Forced labor of Germans in the Soviet Union
- Forced labor of Hungarians in the Soviet Union
- Polish prisoners-of-war in the Soviet Union after 1939
- Italian prisoners of war in the Soviet Union
- WW II forced labor reparations
- Japanese prisoners of war in the Soviet Union
- Romanian prisoners of war in the Soviet Union
