= Amurlag (1938–1941) =

Subdivision of GULAG from 1938–1941

Amur Railroad Corrective Labor Camp (Amurlag) (Russian: Амурский железнодорожный исправительно-трудовой лагерь, Амурлаг) was a subdivision of GULAG which existed during 1938-1941. It was created from the disbanded Bamlag. Its administration was headquartered in the settlement of Svobodny, Amur Oblast. Its main activity was railroad construction. Its peak headcount was about 125,000 (1938).

In 1941 it was disestablished and its subcamps were resubordinated to ru:Бурлаг and ru:Свободлаг.

== Notable convicts ==
- Nikolai Starostin, Russian footballer and ice hockey player

== See also ==
- Amurlag (1947–1953)
