= Aktyubinlag =

Gulag labor camp

Aktyubinlag, also Aktyubinstroy, Aktyubkominat, and ITL and Construction Administration of the Aktyubinsk Combine of the NKVD (Russian: Актюбинлаг, Актюбинстрой, Актюбкомбинат, ИТЛ и Строительство Актюбинского комбината НКВД) was a forced labor camp under the control of the GULAG that was operational from 27 Feb 1940 to 24 Apr 1946, located in Aktyubinsk (modern-day Aktobe), Kazakh Soviet Socialist Republic.

The prisoners were mostly used for mining various ores and stones, including chromium, ferronickel, nickel, quartzite, and coal. However they were also involved in agriculture; fishing; and construction of factories, houses, roadways, and railroads.

There were a total of 63,127 people who were imprisoned here, peaking in 1943 with 14,842 prisoners.
