= Hava Volovich =

Russian writer

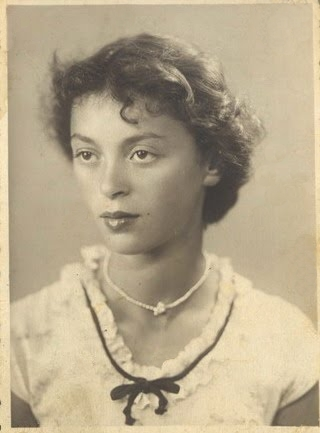
- Born: 1916; Ukraine
- Died: 2000 (aged 83–84); Mena, Ukraine
- Occupations: Writer, actress, director
- Writing career
- Subject: Gulag witness
- Notable work: Vospominaniia (memoirs)
- Website: sites.google.com/site/havavolovich/

Hava Vladimirovna Volovich (ru:Волович, Хава Владимировна;1916–2000), was a Ukrainian writer, actress, puppet theater director and Gulag survivor. In literary value and historical witness, her notes from the Soviet forced labour camps have been compared with Shalamov's stories and Anne Frank's Diary. Anne Applebaum wrote that Volovich stands out in the anthology "Gulag Voices", as she, like Elena Glinka, was not afraid to touch upon taboo subjects Volovich's story about her own child in the camp contrasts to some stereotypes about the selfishness and venality of gulag prisoners who bore children there.

== Biography ==
Hava Vladimirovna (Vilkovna) Volovich was born in 1916 into a Jewish family in Mena, a small town in the Chernihiv region of northern Ukraine. In 1934 she finished a seven-year school and began work first as a typesetter and then as sub-editor with a local newspaper.

Volovich was arrested on August 14, 1937, on the charge of anti-Soviet agitation and sentenced to fifteen years in the Soviet forced ("correctional") labor camps or "ITL" She served her time in "Sevzheldorlag" (lumbering) at the "Mariinsky Mine" (Мариинский прииск) (farm work), in "Ozerlag" and in "Dzhezkasgan". In 1942, she had a daughter who died in the gulag in 1944. For many years she participated in the camp amateur productions, acting in the camp theater and organizing a marionette theater. She was released on April 20, 1953.

After the camp, Volovich lived in exile until 1956. In 1957, she returned to her hometown. Starting in 1958, she directed the local club puppet theater. She was exonerated on December 28, 1963.

She died in Mena on February 14, 2000.

== Publications ==
- (in Russian) Журнал «Горизонт», No. 2, 1989 г..
- (in Russian)Доднесь тяготеет. [Сб. воспоминаний]. Вып. 1. Записки вашей современницы / Сост. С. С. Виленский. — М.: Сов. пис., 1989. — С. 461–494.
- (in Russian)Озерлаг: как это было / сост. Л. С. Мухин. — Иркутск : Вост.-Сиб. кн. изд-во, 1992. — С. 55–87.
- (in Russian)Театр Гулага. Воспоминания. Очерки / Сост. М. М. Кораллов. — М.: Звенья, 1995. — С. 143—155 Театр ГУЛАГа.
- (in Russian)Отечественные записки. 2006. No. 2/27 (на сайте ОЗ текст убран, но сохранился в кэше Яндекса).
- Till my Tale is Told.[women's memoirs of GULAG] by Indiana University Press, 1999.Till my Tale is Told
- Gulag Voices. edited by Anne Applebaum, Yale University Press, 2011.Gulag Voices
