= Likovlag =

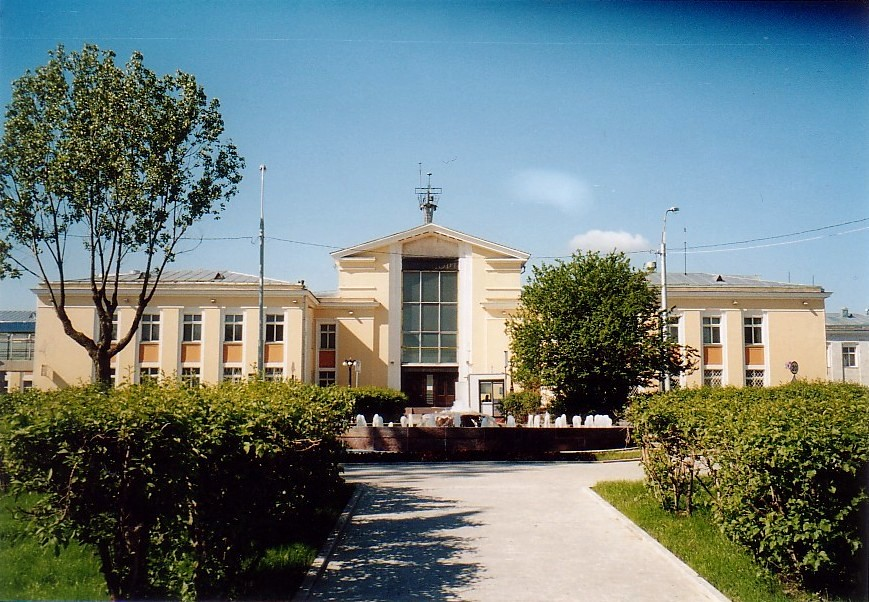
Vnukovo airport old terminal (pictured in 2000) built by inmates of Likovlag concentration camp

Likovsky ITL (Russian: Ликовский исправительно-трудовой лагерь), Likovlag (Russian: Ликовлаг), or Construction site number 204 (Russian: строительство № 204) was a Soviet Gulag labour camp in Moscow oblast whose inmates built the Vnukovo airport.

== History ==
The concentration camp was established on 16 August 1938. It was located between the villages Likova and Izvarino, Kuntsevsky rayon, Moscow Oblast. The construction was personally overseen by Kliment Voroshilov.

Prisoners of Likovlag were also working on the construction of a residential building for the Soviet elite on the Frunzenskaya embankment in central Moscow.

The camp was closed down soon after completion of the construction of Vnukovo airport in late 1941.

== Number of inmates ==
As at date	Number
1 October 1938	2,817
1 January 1939	4,556
15 February 1939	3,987
1 January 1940	3,255
July 1941 г.	11,063

== Camp commandants ==
- Krichmar Ya.N., since 16 August 38
- Umov I.A. (mentioned in January and April 1941)
- Makukha ?.?., by 16 October 1941

== Links ==
- НКВД: Место службы — Ликовский ИТЛ и строительство № 204 - Кадровый состав органов государственной безопасности СССР. 1935−1939 [Selected biographies of NKVD staff serving in Likovlag]
