= Bamlag =

GULAG campsite in USSR

Baikal Amur Corrective Labor Camp (Bamlag) (Russian: Байка́ло-Аму́рский исправи́тельно-трудово́й ла́герь, Бамла́г) was a subdivision of GULAG which existed during 1932-1948.

Its main activity was construction of the Baikal–Amur Mainline and secondary railroad branches. Its peak headcount was about 201,000 (1938). In 1938 it was dismantled into several railroad support camps: Amurlag, ru:Южлаг, ru:Западный железнодорожный ИТЛ, ru:Востоклаг, ru:Юго-Восточный железнодорожный ИТЛ, ru:Бурлаг.

Its administration was headquartered in the settlement of Svobodny, Amur Oblast. For the most time it was headed by Naftaly Frenkel (1934-1938), who also headed the construction directorate of BAM (1933-1938).

== Notable convicts ==
- Arseny Alving, Russian poet, novelist and translator
- Borys Antonenko-Davydovych, Ukrainian writer, translator and linguist
- Pavel Florensky, Russian Orthodox theologian and philosopher
- Yevgeni Gerken, Russian poet and translator
- Konstantin Rokossovsky, Soviet marshal, and Defense Minister of the Polish People's Republic.
- Абиссов, Александр Афанасьевич
- Анфилов, Глеб Иосафович
- Аргунов, Андрей Иванович
- Богданов, Евгений Иванович
- Варпаховский, Леонид Викторович
- Вермель, Юлий Матвеевич
- Воловик, Георгий Георгиевич
- Герман (Кокель)
- Ковалёв, Лев Борисович
- Легейдо, Дмитрий Константинович
- Матвеев, Андрей Фёдорович
- Таранушенко, Стефан Андреевич
- Фасмер, Рихард Рихардович
- Цветаева, Анастасия Ивановна
