= Romanian prisoners of war in the Soviet Union =

By the end of World War II, the number of Romanian prisoners of war in the Soviet Union was significant. Up to 100,000 Romanian soldiers were disarmed and taken prisoner by the Red Army after the Royal coup d'état of August 23, 1944, when Romania switched its alliance from the Axis powers to the Allies. Before that date, almost 165,000 Romanian soldiers were reported missing, with most of them assumed to be POWs. Soviet authorities generally used prisoners of war as a work force in various labor camps.

From late 1943 to early 1944, Romanian POWs were present in all 16 production camps operated by the Soviets. They were the majority in Camp no. 75 from Ryabovo (peat extraction), Camp no. 93 from Tyumen (forestry operations), and Camp no. 99 from Spassky-Zavod (coal industry), and had a significant share in the labor force in Camp no. 68 from Potanino, Camp no. 84 from Asbest, and Camp no. 108 from Beketovka.

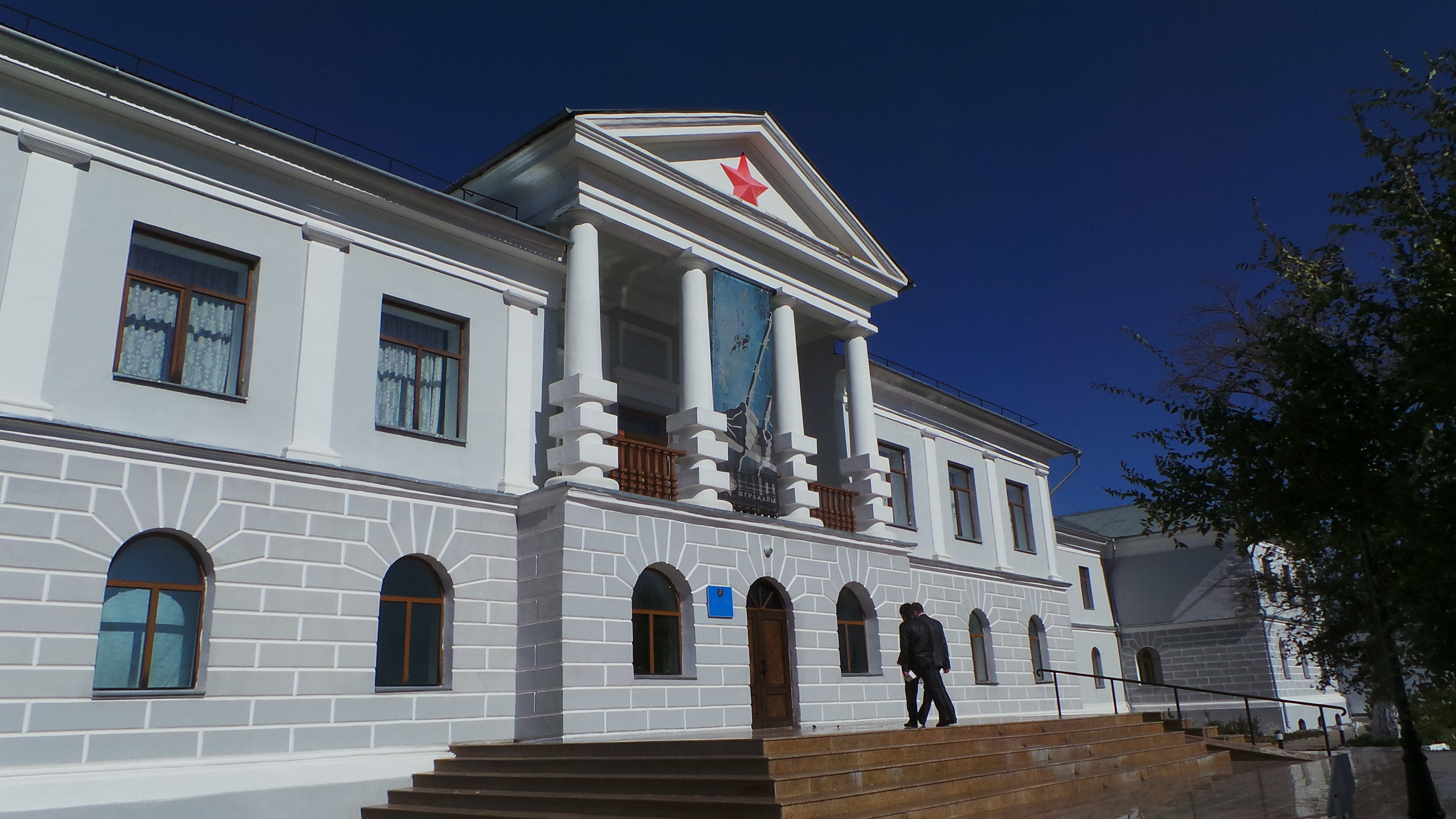
Karlag Administrative Building in Dolinka

For example, 6,740 Romanians worked in the Spassky prisoner-of-war camp of Karlag, in Karaganda Oblast, Kazakh SSR. Located at a distance of 45 km (28 mi) from Karaganda, Spassky camp no. 99 was established in July 1941, and was the largest POW camp in the region. The first group of Romanian POWs (totaling 918 prisoners) arrived at the camp on September 8, 1941. While eventually most of the prisoners in the camp were German and Japanese, over 8,000 of them were Romanian POWs. Over 1,100 of those Romanian prisoners died at Spassky camp, due to the harsh conditions there.

Some Romanian prisoners volunteered to fight for the Soviets; they went on to form the Tudor Vladimirescu Division under Nicolae Cambrea in October 1943, but it did not go into action until after King Michael I led Romania to join the Allies. In April 1945 a second division, the Horia, Cloșca și Crișan Division led by Mihail Lascăr, was created, a mixture of prisoners and Romanian communist volunteers, but the war ended before it saw combat.

An April 1946 report to Vyacheslav Molotov (see the wikisource reference) stated that in 1945, 61,662 Romanian POWs were repatriated, 20,411 took part in forming Romanian volunteer divisions, and about 50,000 more remained in labor camps. The last Romanian POWs were freed in 1956. Some were arrested again by Communist Romanian authorities on their arrival in Romania "for waging war on the Soviet Union", and sent to Sighet Prison.

On September 9, 2003, a granite monument was inaugurated at the Spassky camp cemetery by then-Romanian President Ion Iliescu. It bears the inscription "In memoriam. To those over 900 Romanian prisoners of war who died in Stalinist camps in central Kazakhstan in 1941–1950."

== See also ==
- Prisoners of war in World War II
