= Ryabovo, Cherepovetsky District, Vologda Oblast =

Ryabovo Рябово
- Village
- Location within Vologda Oblast Location within Russia
- Coordinates: 58°56′N 38°26′E
- Country: Russia
- Region: Vologda Oblast
- District: Cherepovetsky District
- Time zone: UTC+3:00

Ryabovo (Russian: Рябово) is a rural locality (a village) in Yugskoye Rural Settlement, Cherepovetsky District, Vologda Oblast, Russia. The population was 49 as of 2002.

== Geography ==
Ryabovo is located 45 km (28 mi) southeast of Cherepovets (the district's administrative centre) by road. Seltso-Ryabovo is the nearest locality. etimologia
