= Sevzheldorlag =

Russian forced labor camp (1938–1950)

Sevzheldorlag (also Sevzheldorstroy, Northern Railway ITL) (Russian: Севжелдорлаг, Севжелдорстрой, Северный железнодорожный ИТЛ) was a penal labor camp of the GULAG system in the USSR. The full name was Северный железнодорожный исправительно-трудовой лагерь НКВД, Northern Railway Corrective Labor Camp of NKVD. Established on May 10, 1938 from subcamps of Ukhtpechlag, because of the sharp increase of the convicts due to the Great Purge. On July 24, 1950 it was merged with North Pechora ITL (Sevpechlag) to make the Pechora ITL (Pechorlag). The camp was at its largest in January 1941 with 84,893 inmates. The main operation was railroad construction. The sites of the camp were within Komi ASSR, East Siberia: at Kotlas railway station, Knyazhpogost settlement (including headquarters), and Zheleznodorozhny settlement (now the town of Yemva).

== Administration ==
- Semyon Ivanovich Shemena, Camp chief (May 10, 1938 – 1940)

== Notable inmates ==
- Hava Volovich
- Sergey Korolyov (1940–1944)
- Mikhail Pavlovich Schrader (October–December 1940, transport to the camp, 1942 – released to leave for the front of the Great Patriotic War)
- Jalmari Virtanen (1938 – April 2, 1939)
- Archbishop Varlaam (Pikalov) (1942, among several other camps)
- Matvey Amagayev (1940 – August 18, 1944)
- Alexander Osipovich Gavronsky, film director; was director of the inmate theatre in Sevzheldorlag
- Nikolai Ivanovich Evgenov (1888–1964), hydrographer and oceanologist (Knyazhpogost, June 1940–February 1941; meteorologist)
- Sergey Sergeevich Maksimov (1916–1967), writer (1936–1941)
- Babareko, Adam Antonovych Babareko (1899–1938), Belarusian writer (Knyazhpogost, May–November 1938)
