= Svobodnensky District =

Svobodnensky District Свободненский район (Russian)
- District
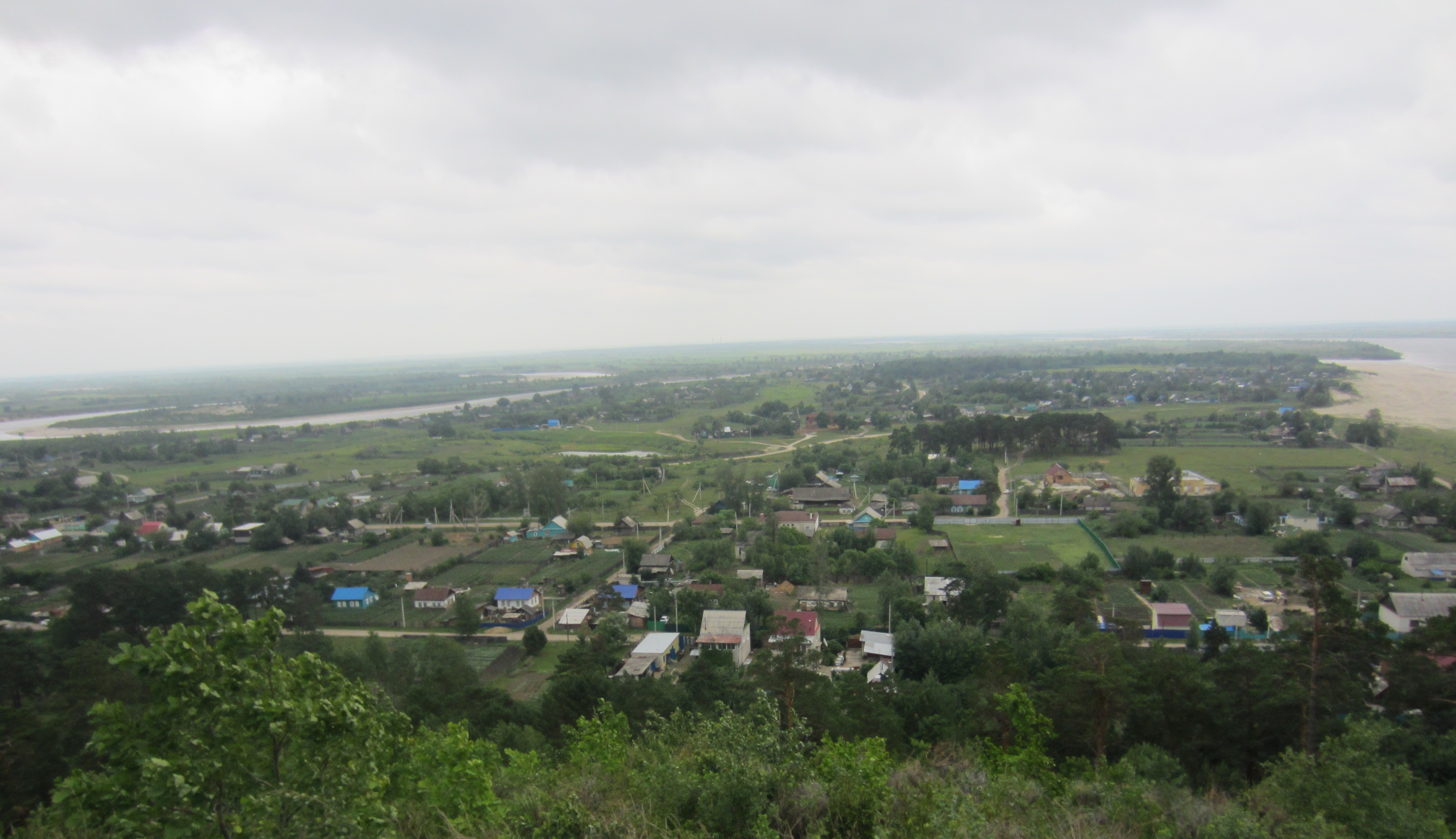
- Village of Little Sazanka in Svobodnensky District

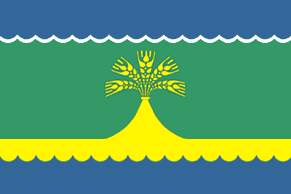
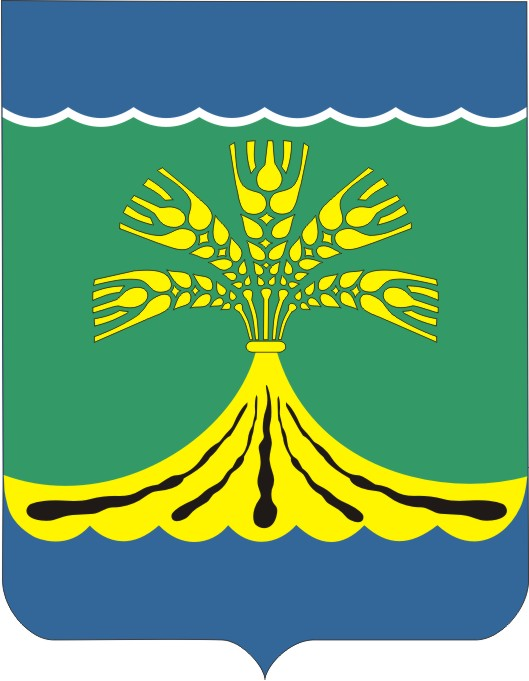
- Flag Coat of arms
- Location of Svobodnensky District in Amur Oblast
- Coordinates: 51°17′30″N 126°53′30″E
- Country: Russia
- Federal subject: Amur Oblast
- Established: 4 January 1926
- Administrative center: Svobodny

Area
  - Total: 7,318 km^{2} (2,825 sq mi)

Population (2010 Census)
  - Total: 14,315
  - Density: 1.956/km^{2} (5.066/sq mi)
  - Urban: 0%
  - Rural: 100%

Administrative structure
  - Administrative divisions: 15 Rural settlements
  - Inhabited localities: 41 rural localities

Municipal structure
  - Municipally incorporated as: Svobodnensky Municipal District
  - Municipal divisions: 0 urban settlements, 15 rural settlements
- Time zone: UTC+9 (MSK+6)
- OKTMO ID: 10642000
- Website: http://www.svobregion.ru/

Svobodnensky District (Russian: Свобо́дненский райо́н) is an administrative and municipal district (raion), one of the twenty in Amur Oblast, Russia. The area of the district is 7,318 square kilometers (2,825 sq mi). Its administrative center is the town of Svobodny (which is not administratively a part of the district). Population: 14,315 (2010 census); 14,568 (2002 Census); 16,879 (1989 Soviet census).

== Administrative and municipal status ==
Within the framework of administrative divisions, Svobodnensky District is one of the twenty in the oblast. The town of Svobodny serves as its administrative center, despite being incorporated separately as an urban okrug—an administrative unit with the status equal to that of the districts.

As a municipal division, the district is incorporated as Svobodnensky Municipal District. Svobodny Urban Okrug is incorporated separately from the district.
