= Svobodny, Amur Oblast =

Town in Amur Oblast, Russia

Svobodny Свободный
- Town
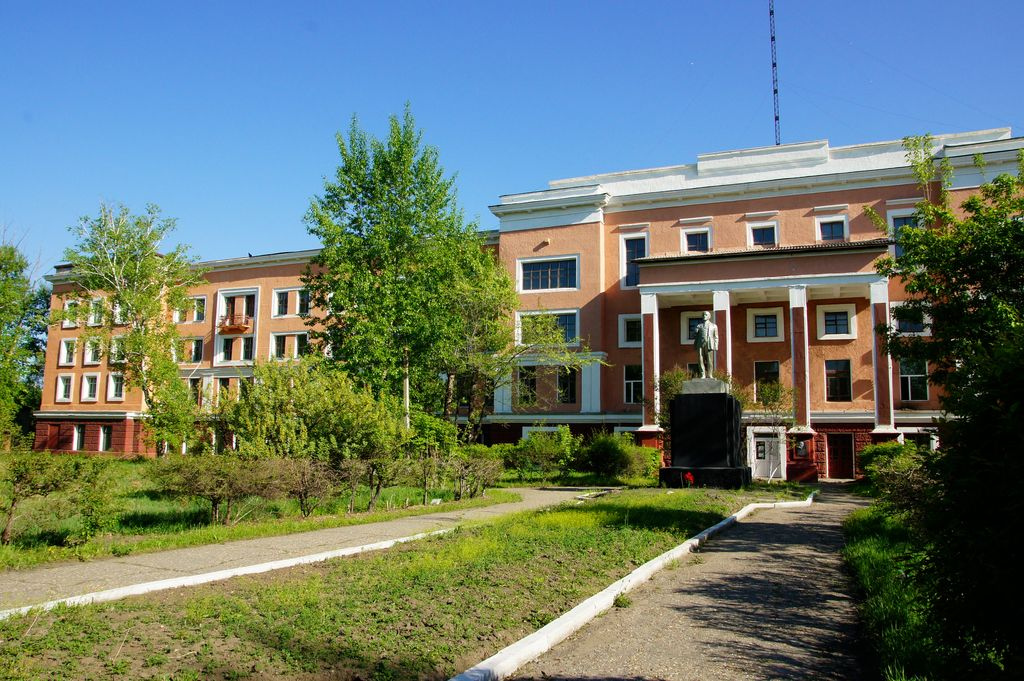
- Railway college in Svobodny

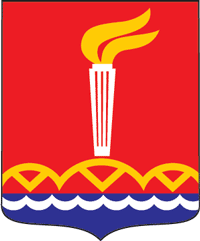
- Flag Coat of arms
- Interactive map of Svobodny
- Location of Svobodny Svobodny (Amur Oblast)
- Coordinates: 51°24′N 128°06′E
- Country: Russia
- Federal subject: Amur Oblast
- Founded: 1912
- Elevation: 190 m (620 ft)

Population (2010 Census)
  - Total: 58,778
  - Estimate (2023): 48,789 (−17%)
  - Rank: 281st in 2010

Administrative status
  - Subordinated to: Svobodny Urban Okrug
  - Capital of: Svobodny Urban Okrug, Svobodnensky District

Municipal status
  - Urban okrug: Svobodny Urban Okrug
  - Capital of: Svobodny Urban Okrug, Svobodnensky Municipal District
- Time zone: UTC+9 (MSK+6)
- Postal code: 676450
- Dialing code: +7 41643
- OKTMO ID: 10730000001
- Website: www.svobnews.amur.ru

Svobodny (Russian: Свободный) is a town in Amur Oblast, Russia, located on the right bank of the Zeya River, 167 kilometers (104 mi) north of Blagoveshchensk, the administrative center of the oblast. Population: 58,778 (2010 census); 63,889 (2002 Census); 80,006 (1989 Soviet census).

== History ==
It was founded in 1912 in conjunction with the construction of the Amur Railway (the Trans-Siberian Railway's "bypass" route, which was to provide a railway connection from European Russia to the Pacific entirely over the Russian soil, without crossing the north-eastern China). It was originally named Alexeyevsk (Алексеевск), in honor of the then crown prince Alexey. In 1917, the town was renamed Svobodny, Russian for "free".

During the chaos of the Russian Civil War, the Russian Far East became a base for several Korean militias and political groups opposed to the Japanese colonization of Korea. They moved into Svobodny in early 1921, but in the summer factional disputes within the Korean Communist Party and the wider Korean nationalist movement broke out into open warfare, the Free City Incident. The Red Army besieged and then destroyed the town, securing victory for its preferred faction.

During the Stalin era, the BAMLag forced labor camp of the Gulag was built in Svobodny, with the intention of providing forced labor for the planned construction of the Baikal-Amur Mainline. The camp became one of the largest in Gulag system; its peak headcount was about 201,000 (1938). In 1938 it was dismantled into several camps.

== Administrative and municipal status ==
Within the framework of administrative divisions, Svodobny serves as the administrative center of Svobodnensky District, even though it is not a part of it. As an administrative division, it is incorporated separately as Svobodny Urban Okrug—an administrative unit with the status equal to that of the districts. As a municipal division, this administrative unit also has urban okrug status.

== Economy ==
The town is home to factories producing machinery and furniture, as well as the administrative center for mining operations in the region, including the gold mining concern Amurzoloto.

=== Transportation ===
The town is an important transportation hub for both rail and river traffic, with two railway stations on the Trans-Siberian Railway including rolling-stock repair facilities, and a river port on the Zeya.

It is served by the Svobodny Airport and is near the Orlovka interceptor air base and other locations maintained by the Russian Air Force.

== Geography ==
The town is located on the right bank of the Zeya River, 167 kilometers (104 mi) north of Blagoveshchensk, the administrative center of the oblast.

=== Climate ===
Svobodny has a warm-summer humid continental climate (Köppen climate classification Dwb) with bitterly cold, very dry winters and very warm, wet summers.

Climate data for Svobodny (1991-2020 normals, extremes 1939-present)
Month	Jan	Feb	Mar	Apr	May	Jun	Jul	Aug	Sep	Oct	Nov	Dec	Year
Record high °C (°F)	0.0 (32.0)	4.1 (39.4)	16.4 (61.5)	32.1 (89.8)	35.2 (95.4)	42.0 (107.6)	38.0 (100.4)	34.7 (94.5)	29.8 (85.6)	26.3 (79.3)	11.6 (52.9)	−0.2 (31.6)	42.0 (107.6)
Mean daily maximum °C (°F)	−17.4 (0.7)	−11.4 (11.5)	−2.0 (28.4)	9.9 (49.8)	18.9 (66.0)	24.7 (76.5)	26.9 (80.4)	24.4 (75.9)	18.2 (64.8)	7.6 (45.7)	−7.2 (19.0)	−17.6 (0.3)	6.3 (43.2)
Daily mean °C (°F)	−24.4 (−11.9)	−19.3 (−2.7)	−9.1 (15.6)	3.2 (37.8)	11.7 (53.1)	17.8 (64.0)	20.7 (69.3)	18.1 (64.6)	11.1 (52.0)	0.9 (33.6)	−13.7 (7.3)	−23.8 (−10.8)	−0.6 (31.0)
Mean daily minimum °C (°F)	−29.9 (−21.8)	−26.2 (−15.2)	−16.5 (2.3)	−3.7 (25.3)	4.1 (39.4)	10.8 (51.4)	14.9 (58.8)	12.5 (54.5)	4.8 (40.6)	−4.9 (23.2)	−19.1 (−2.4)	−28.8 (−19.8)	−6.8 (19.7)
Record low °C (°F)	−50.0 (−58.0)	−45.0 (−49.0)	−40.0 (−40.0)	−23.4 (−10.1)	−11.8 (10.8)	−0.9 (30.4)	2.3 (36.1)	0.2 (32.4)	−8.3 (17.1)	−25.5 (−13.9)	−52.1 (−61.8)	−47.2 (−53.0)	−52.1 (−61.8)
Average precipitation mm (inches)	6.9 (0.27)	6.0 (0.24)	11.0 (0.43)	27.0 (1.06)	63.5 (2.50)	82.8 (3.26)	143.8 (5.66)	114.3 (4.50)	66.0 (2.60)	31.3 (1.23)	16.7 (0.66)	9.6 (0.38)	578.9 (22.79)

== Notable people ==
The town is the birthplace of the movie director Leonid Gaidai, whose memorial was unveiled in September 2006.
