= Forced labor of Germans in the Soviet Union =

Soviet policy during and after WWII

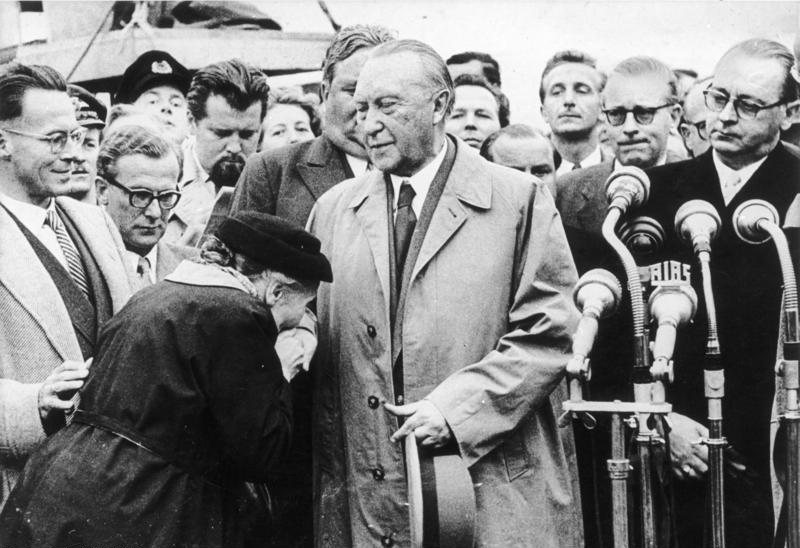
The mother of a prisoner thanks Konrad Adenauer upon his return from Moscow, September 14, 1955. Adenauer had succeeded in concluding negotiations about the release to Germany, by the end of the year, of 15,000 German civilians and prisoners of war, more than a decade after the war with Germany had ended on May 8, 1945.

Forced labor of Germans in the Soviet Union was considered by the Soviet Union to be part of German war reparations for the damage inflicted by Nazi Germany on the Soviet Union during the Axis-Soviet campaigns (1941–1945) of World War II. Soviet authorities deported German civilians from Germany and Eastern Europe to the USSR after World War II as forced laborers, while ethnic Germans living in the USSR were deported during World War II and conscripted for forced labor. German prisoners of war were also used as a source of forced labor during and after the war by the Soviet Union and by the Western Allies.

Nazi Germany had used forced labour of people in the occupied territories since the beginning of World War II. In 1940, it initiated Ostarbeiter, a massive project of enslaving the populations of Eastern European countries to use as forced labour in German factories and agricultural facilities. The Soviet government proposed the use of German labor as reparations in 1943, and raised the issue at the Yalta Conference in February 1945. The USSR began deporting ethnic Germans from the Balkans in late 1944, most of the surviving internees had returned by 1950. The NKVD took the lead role in the deportations via its department, the Chief Directorate for Prisoners of War and Internee Affairs (GUPVI).

Information about the forced labor of Germans in the Soviet Union was suppressed in the Eastern Bloc until after the dissolution of the Soviet Union in 1991. Before that, however, it was known in the West through accounts released in West Germany and recollections of the internees. Historians cite German accounts that cover the employment of German labor by the USSR. Statistics for the Soviet use of German civilian labor are divergent and contradictory. This article details the published statistical data from the West German Schieder commission of 1951–1961, the German Red Cross, the report of the German Federal Archives and a study by Gerhard Reichling (an employee of the Federal Statistical Office of Germany). Recently declassified statistical data from the Soviet archives on the use of German civilian labor in the Stalin era were published in the book Against Their Will (Russian: «Не по своей воле», 2001).

== Disclosures from the Soviet archives ==
Since the fall of the USSR the Soviet archives have been accessible to researchers. In 2001, the Russian scholar Pavel Polian published an account of the deportations during the Soviet era, Against Their Will. Polian's study detailed the Soviet statistics on the employment of German civilian labor during the Stalin era.

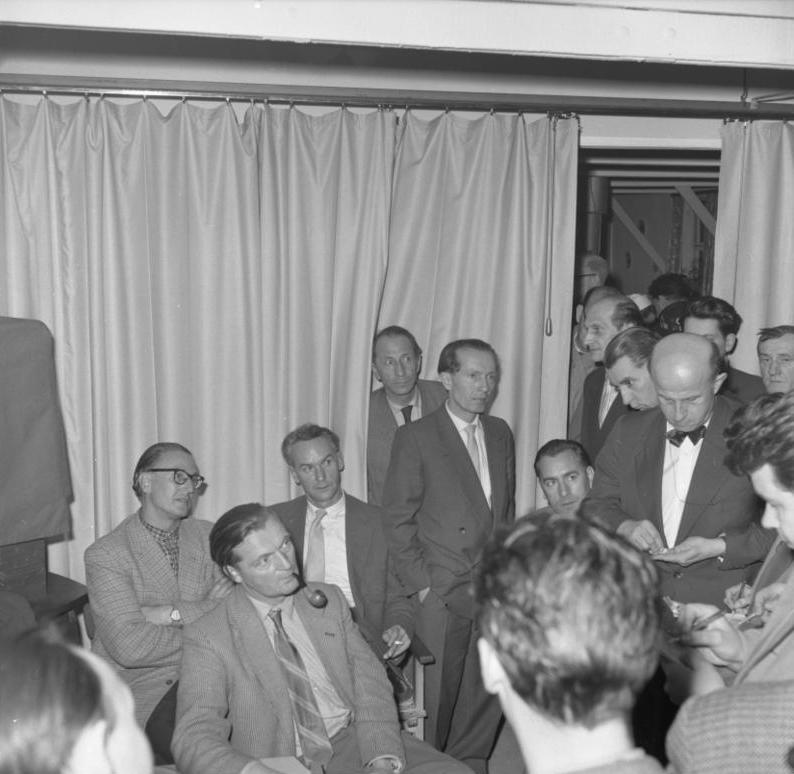
February, 1958. German scientists repatriated from Sukhumi.

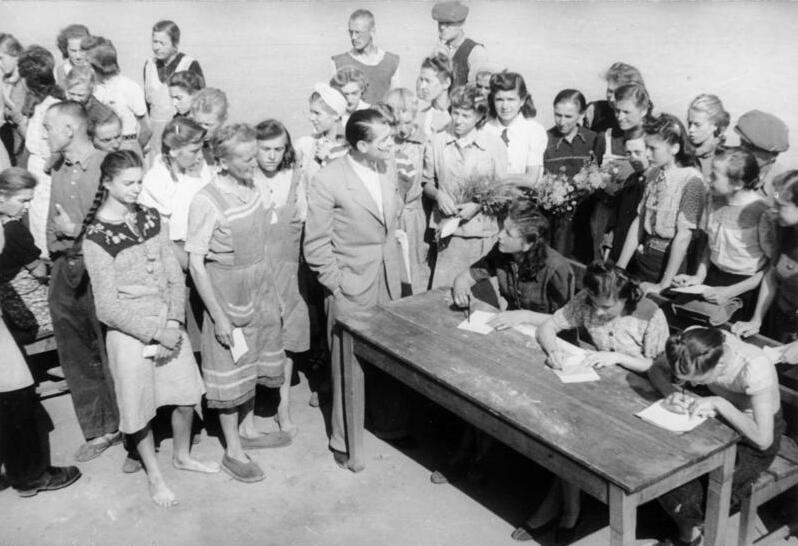
August 1947, German women and girls released from Soviet captivity wait in 14 days of quarantine at the Polte Nord returnee camp, before finally going home.

In 1943, Ivan Maisky, the Soviet ambassador to the UK, was ordered by the Soviet government to form a task force on the issue of post-war reparations from Germany. Maisky's report of August 1944 proposed the employment of German civilian labor in the USSR as part of war reparations. At the Yalta Conference the Soviet Union made it clear to the Western Allies that they intended to employ German civilian labor as part of war reparations, at this time the U.S. and UK did not raise any objections to the Soviet use of German civilian labor.

By the summer of 1944, the Soviet forces had reached the Balkans that had ethnic German minorities. State Defense Committee Order 7161 of December 16, 1944 instructed to intern all able-bodied Germans of ages 17–45 (men) and 18-30 (women) residing within the territories of Romania (67,332 persons), Hungary (31,920 persons), Yugoslavia (12,579 persons), which were under the control of the Red Army. Consequently, 111,831 (61,375 men and 50,456 women) able-bodied adult ethnic Germans from Romania, Yugoslavia, and Hungary were deported for forced labor to the USSR.

During the 1945 military campaign in Poland, the Soviet Union interned suspected Nazi party members and government officials in camps in the Soviet-occupied areas east of the Oder-Neisse line. Persons held in these short-lived camps east of the line were subsequently transferred to NKVD special camps in the Soviet occupation zone of Germany or to the Soviet Union for forced labor. By May 1945 the NKVD had selected for deportation to the USSR 66,152 German civilians who were considered suspected Nazi party members and government officials, as well as 89,110 able-bodied adults (mostly men) for forced labor. In early 1947 the Soviets sent an additional 4,579 Germans from the Soviet occupation zone to the USSR as forced laborers.

The Soviets classified the civilians interned into two groups; the first Group A (205,520 persons) were "mobilized internees" who were able-bodied adults selected for labor; the second Group D (66,152 persons) "arrested internees" were Nazi party members, German government officials and suspected agents, and others considered a threat by the Soviets. Soviet records state that they repatriated 21,061 Polish citizens from labor camps which indicates that not all of the internees were ethnic Germans and some could have been ethnic Poles.

The Soviets sent about three-quarters of the laborers to the Donets Basin to work in the reconstruction of heavy industry and mines, and about 11% to the Urals' heavy industries. The workers were housed in concentration camps under armed guard. The working and living conditions were harsh and according to Soviet records about 24% of those interned died. Forced labor turned out to be inefficient and unprofitable since many of the women and older men were not able to perform heavy labor. Repatriation started as early as 1945 and almost all were released by 1950.

Ethnic German civilians interned by USSR - Soviet data from the Russian archives

Country	Number
Former eastern territories of Germany and Poland	155,262
Romania	67,332
Hungary	31,920
Yugoslavia	12,579
Soviet occupation zone in Germany	4,579
Total Interned	271,672
Repatriated by 12/1949	(201,464)
Died or "withdrawn"	(66,456)
Still Held 12/1949	3,752

Source of figures Pavel Polian-Against Their Will

Notes:

1. Country indicates the location where the persons were conscripted, not citizenship.
2. The 201,464 surviving internees were citizens of the following nations: Germany 77,692; Romania 61,072; Hungary 29,101; Poland 21,061; Yugoslavia 9,034; Czechoslovakia 2,378; Austria 199; Bulgaria and other countries 927.
3. Figures do not include German civilians interned in the Kaliningrad Oblast, the former East Prussia.
4. Figures do not include "Forced Repatriation" and "Resettlers", Ethnic Germans from the USSR who had been resettled by Germany in Poland during the war. They were returned to the USSR.
5. Figures do not include military POWs.
6. Still held December 1949: Persons convicted by Soviet military tribunals and held in MVD prisons in the USSR.

Thanks to the opening of Russian archives, the fates of some of these civilians are now known. By late 1996, the German Red Cross had received from Russia 199,000 records of deported German civilians who had either been repatriated or died in Soviet captivity. For example, the records of Pauline Gölner reveal that she was born in 1926 in Wolkendorf in Transylvania, was arrested on January 15, 1945, and sent to forced labor in the coal mines of Chanchenkowo (Ukraine). She died there on February 26, 1949, 23 years old.

There is currently an ongoing research program in collaboration between Russia and Germany.

== Deportation and forced labor of Soviet Germans during WW2 ==
The ethnic German minority in the USSR was considered a security risk by the Soviet government and they were deported during the war in order to prevent their possible collaboration with the Nazi invaders. In August 1941 the Soviet government ordered ethnic Germans to be deported from the European USSR. By early 1942, 1,031,300 Germans had been banished to Central Asia and Siberia. During 1945 the Soviets deported to the special settlements an additional 203,796 Soviet ethnic Germans who had been resettled by Germany in Poland . During the war, shortages of food plagued the whole Soviet Union, especially within the special settlements. Life in the special settlements was harsh and severe; food was limited and the deported population was governed by strict regulations. According to data from the Soviet archives, 687,300 Germans remained alive in the special settlements by October 1945, and an additional 316,600 Soviet Germans served as labor conscripts during World War II in NKVD labor columns, later informally referred to as "labor army". Soviet Germans were not accepted in the regular armed forces but were employed instead as conscript labor. The labor army members followed camp-like regulations and received the GULAG rations. In 1949, the German population in the special settlements was put at 1,035,701 by the NKVD. According to J. Otto Pohl 65,599 Germans perished in the special settlements; he believes that an additional 176,352 unaccounted for persons "probably died in the labor army". During the Stalin era the Soviet Germans continued to be confined to the special settlements under strict supervision. They were rehabilitated in 1955, but were not allowed to return to the European USSR until 1972. The Soviet German population grew despite the deportations and forced labor during the war: in the 1939 Soviet census the German population was 1.427 million; by 1959 it had increased to 1.619 million.

== Schieder commission ==
The West German government-sponsored Schieder commission during the 1950s documented the population transfer of Germans from East-Central Europe after World War II. The head of the commission was Theodor Schieder a rehabilitated former member of the Nazi party. In 1952, Schieder was chosen by the West German government to head the Commission that would document the fate of the Germans from Eastern Europe.

From 1953 to 1961, the Schieder commission made estimates of the numbers of German civilians who died in the expulsions and those deported to the USSR for forced labor. These estimates are still cited in current accounts of the expulsions and deportations.

The following is a summary of the figures published by the Schieder commission from 1953 to 1961 for forced labor only. The figures are rough estimates and are not based on an actual enumeration of the dead.

- Former eastern territories of Germany — 218,000 German civilians were deported to the USSR and at least 100,000 to 125,000 died.
- Romania — 75,000 German civilians were deported to the USSR and that 15% (10,000) did not return.
- Hungary — 30,000 to 35,000 German civilians were deported to the USSR and that death toll was 6,000.
- Yugoslavia — 27,000 to 35,000 German civilians were deported to the USSR and that death toll was 4,500 to 5,000.

== German Red Cross estimates ==
The West German Search Service working with the German Red Cross attempted to trace German civilians deported to the USSR and estimate the approximate number who died. The results of these West German efforts to trace the fate of those deported was detailed in the study Gesucht wird (lit. 'Looking for') by Kurt Böhme, published in 1965. The number of deported was derived by estimating the number of persons sent to the USSR, and was not based on an actual enumeration. The work of the German Search Service to trace the fates of civilians in eastern Europe was only partially successful. The figures for those deported and deaths were rough estimates and not always based on confirmed reports. As of 30 September 1964, the Search Service compiled information on 504,153 German civilians interned in the USSR (217,827 were still alive in 1964, 154,449 had returned home, 85,145 were reported missing, and 46,732 confirmed dead as forced laborers).

The figures from the German Red Cross are cited in some English language accounts of the German civilians deported to the USSR.

Forced labor of German civilians - estimate by German Red Cross in 1964

Description	Number deported	Death rate	Dead & reported missing
A. "Reparations Deportees"	375,000	45%	169,000
B. Forced Labor in Kaliningrad Oblast	110,000	45%	50,000
C. "Forced Repatriation" and "Resettlers"	300,000	37%	111,000
D. Civilians held as POWs	45,000	22.2%	10,000
E. "Forced Service"	26,000	0.4%	100
F. Klaipėda (Memel) residents	10,500	9.5%	1,000
G. "Convicted POWs"	7,500	9%	700
Total	874,000	39%	341,800

Source of figures: Kurt W. Böhme - Gesucht wird - Die dramatische Geschichte des Suchdienstes Süddeutscher Verlag, München 1965 Page 275

Notes:

These categories in the Red Cross figures for deportees are also listed above in the Russian archive statistics.

A. Reparations Deportees ("reparationsverschleppte") Ethnic German civilians conscripted for labor in the Soviet Union for damages caused by Germany during the war. Origin- Former eastern territories of Germany and Poland -233,000; Romania 80,000: Hungary 35,000 and Yugoslavia 27,000. Most of the survivors were released by 1950.

E. "Forced Service" ( "Zwangsverpflichtete") -In the latter part of 1946 6,000 skilled workers mostly from the Soviet occupation zone accompanied by 20,000 family members were conscripted for work in the USSR under contract for five years. They were held under favorable conditions they began to be released in 1950, the last returned home in 1958.

These categories in the Red Cross figures for deportees are not listed above in the Russian archive statistics.

B. Forced Labor in Kaliningrad Oblast- German civilians interned in the former East Prussia, most of the survivors were released by 1948.

C. "Forced Repatriation" and "Resettlers" ("Zwangrepatriierte"/"Vertragsumsiedler") Ethnic Germans from the USSR who had been resettled by Germany in Poland during the war. They were returned to the USSR.

D. Civilians held as POWs — The Soviets classified these persons as POWs and they were held in POW camps, they were ethnic Germans from the Former eastern territories of Germany and Poland.

F. Klaipėda (Memel) residents- Ethnic Germans who remained in Klaipėda after the war. They were deported into the USSR,

G. "Convicted POWs" (Strafgefangene) POWs convicted of war crimes and held in Soviet prisons. They were released by 1955.

== German Federal Archive Report ==
In 1969, the Federal West German government ordered a study of expulsion losses to be conducted by the German Federal Archives which was finished in 1974. The study estimated a total of 600,000 deaths caused by what they call 'crimes and inhumanites' in the eyes of West German law, including 200,000 in forced labor in the USSR. Their definition of crimes included confirmed deaths caused by military activity in the 1944-45 campaign as well as deliberate killings and estimated deaths due to forced labor. They maintained that report was only intended to provide historical documentation not as a basis for criminal charges in the future. However, in Poland and Czechoslovakia, during the Cold war, these charges were viewed as an attempt to seek revenge and revert to pre-war borders. The authors maintain that their figures cover only those deaths caused by violent acts and inhumanities (Unmenschlichkeiten) and do not include post-war deaths due to malnutrition and disease. Also not included are those persons who were raped or suffered mistreatment and did not die immediately. No figures were given for Romania and Hungary.

The following is a summary of the deaths estimated in the German Federal Archive Report. The figures are rough estimates and not based on an actual enumeration of persons deported and those that died.

Civilian Deaths Listed by German Federal Archives 1974

Description	Total Deaths	Oder-Neisse region, Poland	Czechoslovakia	Yugoslavia
Forced Labor-Deported to USSR	205,000	200,000	-	5,000
Forced labor -N. East Prussia	40,000	40,000	-	-
In Post War Internment Camps	227,000	60,000	100,000	67,000
Violent Deaths during war 1945	138,000	100,000	30,000	8,000
Total	610,000	400,000	130,000	80,000

Source: German Federal Archive, Spieler, Silke Vertreibung und Vertreibungsverbrechen 1945-1948. Bericht des Bundesarchivs vom 28. Mai 1974. Archivalien und ausgewählte Erlebnisberichte. Bonn 1989 Pages 53–54

This category of deportees in the Federal Archive Report is also listed above in the Russian archive statistics.

A. Deported from Former eastern territories of Germany and Poland for forced labor in the USSR - Over 400,000 civilians deported to USSR of whom they estimated about 200,000 died. The author of the study based these figures on the German Red Cross report which is detailed above.

B. Deported from Yugoslavia for forced labor in the USSR - About 27,000 to 30,000 civilians deported to USSR of whom c. 5,000 died.

C. The German Federal Archives study did not provide figures for Romania and Hungary.

These civilian deaths in the Federal Archive Report are not listed above in the Russian archive statistics.

D. Labor camps in northern East Prussia Kaliningrad Oblast - 110,000 held by USSR in northern East Prussia. Overall they estimated 40,000 persons perished.

E. Held in post-war Polish internment camps - The German Federal Archives estimated 60,000 deaths of the 200,000 Germans in post-war Polish internment camps. The report mentioned that ethnic German citizens from pre-war Poland were considered "traitors of the nation" and sentenced to forced labor.

F. 67,000 deaths in Yugoslav internment camps.

G. 100,000 deaths in Czechoslovak internment camps.

H. The report also estimated 138,000 violent civilian deaths during military campaign in 1944–1945;(100,000in Poland, 30,000 in Czechoslovakia and 8,000 in Yugoslavia).

== Study by Gerhard Reichling ==
A study of German forced labor and expulsions by the West German researcher Dr. Gerhard Reichling was published by the Kulturstiftung der deutschen Vertriebenen (Foundation of the German Expellees) in 1986. Reichling was an employee of the Federal Statistical Office who was involved in the study of German expulsion statistics since 1953. Reichling's figures for German forced labor were based on his own calculations, his figures are estimates and are not based on an actual enumeration of the dead. Dr. Kurt Horstmann of the Federal Statistical Office of Germany wrote the foreword to the study, endorsing the work of Reichling.

Description	Deported	Deaths
Germany (1937 Borders)	400,000	160,000
Poland (1939 Borders)	112,000	40,000
Danzig	10,000	5,000
Czechoslovakia	30,000	4,000
Baltic States	19,000	8,000
Hungary	30,000	10,000
Romania	89,000	33,000
Yugoslavia	40,000	10,000
USSR	980,000	310,000
Total	1,710,000	580,000

Source of figures: Dr. Gerhard Reichling, Die deutschen Vertriebenen in Zahlen, Teil 1, Bonn 1986 (revised edition 1995). Pages 33 and 36

This category of deportees is also listed above in the Russian archive statistics.

A. Deported from Eastern Europe to USSR 1945-1950 as reparations labor, Total 600,000. (Germany (1937 borders) 400,000; Danzig 10,000, Czechoslovakia 30,000; Baltic States 10,000; Hungary 30,000; Romania 80,000; Yugoslavia 40,000.) Total Dead 224,000 (Germany (1937 borders)160,000; Danzig 5,000, Czechoslovakia 3,000; Baltic States 6,000; Hungary 10,000; Romania 30,000; Yugoslavia 10,000.)

These categories of deportees in Reichling's report are not listed above in the Russian archive statistics.

B. "Forced Repatriation" and "Resettlers" – Soviet ethnic Germans returned to the USSR after World War II. Total deported 310,000 (USSR 280,000; Baltic States 9,000; Poland 12,000; Romania 9,000) Total Dead 110,000 (USSR 100,000; Baltic States 3,000; Poland 4,000; Romania 3,000)

C. Soviet Germans Deported in USSR 1941–1942 – Total deported 700,000 of whom 210,000 died

D. German forced labor in post-war Poland 1945–1950 – Total 100,000 of whom 36,000 died.

== Technical experts ==
The Soviet Union exploited the technical expertise of the German specialists who were resident in the Soviet occupation zone of Germany as well as POWs held in the USSR. In October 1946 the Soviet NKVD forcibly deported from East Germany "a few hundred" selected German experts to work in the USSR. They were held under favorable conditions and most were released by 1948. They worked in the aviation industry and the development of submarines. A selected few remained in the USSR until the early 1950s including German scientists who worked in the Soviet Union on the development of ballistic missiles, Helmut Gröttrup was among this group. They were not directly involved in the missile program but were only consulted by Soviet engineers. Manfred von Ardenne worked on the Soviet atomic bomb project and was awarded a Stalin Prize.

== Prisoners of war ==
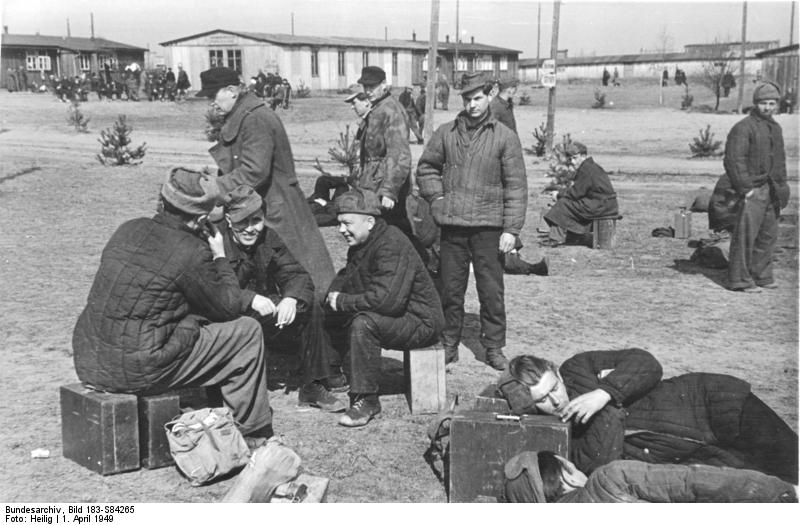
A group of recently released German POWs waiting to be sent back home, before their repatriation in 1949

Forced labour was also included in the Morgenthau Plan draft from September 1944, and was included in the final protocol of the Yalta Conference. The Soviet Union and the western allies employed German POW labor up until 1949.

German POWs were forced into slave labor during and after World War II by the Soviet Union. Based on documents in the Russian archives, Grigori F. Krivosheev in his 1993 study listed 2,389,600 German nationals taken as POWs and the deaths of 450,600 of these German POWs including 356,700 in NKVD camps and 93,900 in transit. In addition he listed 182,000 Austrians taken prisoner. In his revised 2001 edition, Krivosheev put the number of German military POWs (Wehrmacht of all nationalities) at 2,733,739 and dead at 381,067. These figures are disputed by sources in the west that give a higher number of POWs captured and estimate losses may be higher than those reported by the USSR. Richard Overy in The Dictators: Hitler's Germany and Stalin's Russia puts total number of German POWs captured by the USSR at 2,880,000 of whom 356,000 died. However, in his Russia's War, Richard Overy maintains that according to Russian sources 356,000 out of 2,388,000 POWs died in Soviet captivity.

A research project by German military historian Rüdiger Overmans stated that 363,000 German POWs died in Soviet custody; Overmans cited the statistics of the West German Maschke commission that put the number of German POWs taken by the Soviets at 3,060,000, of whom 1,090,000 died in captivity. Overmans also believed it was possible, although not provable, that 700,000 German military personnel reported missing actually died in Soviet custody; Overmans estimates the "maximum" death toll of German POWs in the USSR at 1.0 million, he maintains that among those reported as missing were men who actually died as POWs.

== See also ==
- Forced labour under German rule during World War II and Ostarbeiters
- Forced labor of Hungarians in the Soviet Union
- Forced labor of Germans after World War II
- Against Their Will: The History and Geography of Forced Migrations in the USSR
- Foreign forced labor in the Soviet Union
- Flight and expulsion of Germans from Romania during and after World War II
- Forced labor in Germany during World War II
- Journey Back to Youth
- OST-Arbeiter - Eastern workers - about foreign forced labor in Germany
- Polish Communist forced labor camps
- The Hunger Angel, 2009 novel by Nobel Prize–winning author Herta Müller
- As Far as My Feet Will Carry Me, 2001 film about German escapee from the Gulag
- Morgenthau Plan

== Sources ==
- Павел Полян, Не по своей воле... (Pavel Polian, Against Their Will... A History and Geography of Forced Migrations in the USSR), ОГИ Мемориал, Moscow, 2001, ISBN 5-94282-007-4
- Pavel Polian-Against Their Will: The History and Geography of Forced Migrations in the USSR Central European University Press 2003 ISBN
- Kurt W. Böhme - Gesucht wird - Die dramtische Geschichte des Suchdienstes Süddeutscher Verlag, München 1965
- Dokumentation der Vertreibung der Deutschen aus Ost-Mitteleuropa./ Bearb. von T. Schieder. Bd. 1–5. Wolfenbattel, 1953–1961
- Die Deutschen Vertreibungsverluste. Bevolkerungsbilanzen fuer die deutschen Vertreibungsgebiete 1939/50. Wiesbaden, 1958
- Rhode G. Phasen und Formen der Massenzwangswanderungen in Europa. // Die Vertriebenen in Westdeutschland. Bd. 1. Kiel, 1959.
- Karner, Stefan, Im Archipel GUPVI. Kriegsgefangenschaft und Internierung in der Sowjetunion 1941-1956. Wien-München 1995.
- Sharkov, Anatoli, GUPVI Archipelago: Prisoners of War and Internees on the Territory of Belarus: 1944—1951(in Russian) (2003), Minsk, Belarus, ISBN 985-463-094-3
- Gerhard Reichling. Die deutschen Vertriebenen in Zahlen, Bonn 1995, ISBN 3-88557-046-7
- Ivan Chukhin, Interned Youth, a history of the NKVD Camp 517 for interned female Germans, Padozero, Karelia
- The Expulsion of 'German' Communities from Eastern Europe at the end of the Second World War, Steffen Prauser and Arfon Rees, European University Institute, Florense. HEC No. 2004/1 (The section "The "expulsion" of the German speaking minority from Yugoslavia" contains info on their deportation to the SU for forced labor)
