= Foreign forced labor in the Soviet Union =

Foreign forced labor was used by the Soviet Union during and in the aftermath of World War II, which continued up to 1950s.

There have been two categories of foreigners amassed for forced labor: prisoners of war and civilians. Both of them were handled by GUPVI, a special department of NKVD, analogous to GULAG, which was established in September 1939, after the start of the Soviet invasion of Poland.

== See also ==
- Forced labor of Germans in the Soviet Union
- Forced labor of Hungarians in the Soviet Union
- Japanese prisoners of war in the Soviet Union
- Italian prisoners of war in the Soviet Union
- Romanian prisoners of war in the Soviet Union
