= German prisoners of war in the Soviet Union =

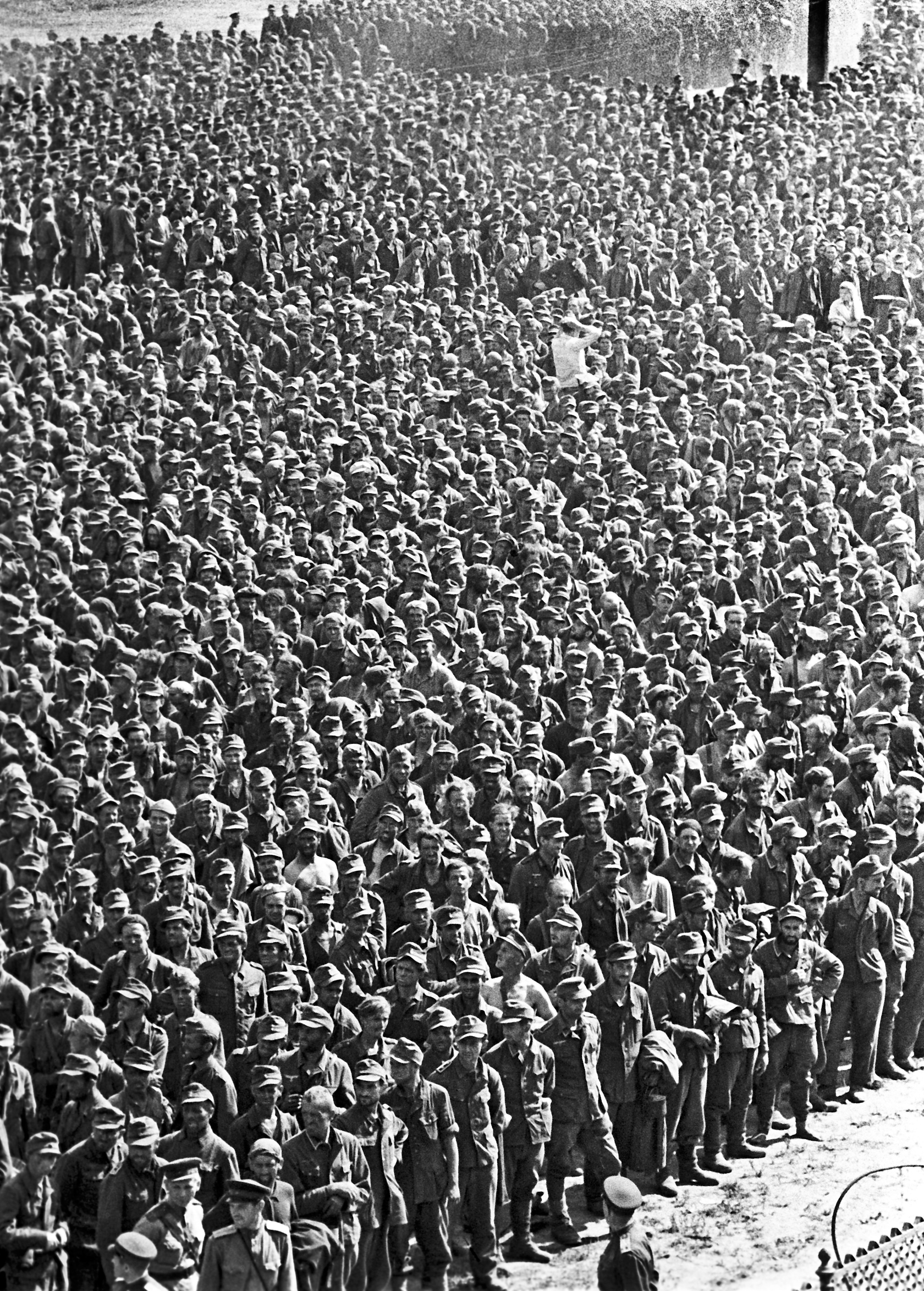
German prisoners-of-war on display during the Parade of the Vanquished in Moscow, July 1944.

Approximately three million German prisoners of war were captured by the Soviet Union during World War II, most of them during the great advances of the Red Army in the last year of the war. The POWs were employed as forced labor in the Soviet wartime economy and post-war reconstruction. By 1950 almost all surviving POWs had been released, with the last prisoner returning from the USSR in 1956.

According to Soviet records 381,067 German Wehrmacht POWs died in NKVD camps of the Main Administration for Affairs of Prisoners of War and Internees (356,700 German nationals and 24,367 from other nations). However, estimates by most non-Soviet historians are much higher than the Soviet data. A commission set up by the West German government found that 3,060,000 German military personnel were taken prisoner by the USSR and that 1,094,250 died in captivity (549,360 from 1941 to April 1945; 542,911 from May 1945 to June 1950 and 1,979 from July 1950 to 1955).

According to German historian Rüdiger Overmans ca. 3,000,000 POWs were taken by the USSR; he put the "maximum" number of German POW deaths in Soviet hands at 1.0 million. Based on his research, the deaths of 363,000 POWs in Soviet captivity can be confirmed by the files of Deutsche Dienststelle (WASt), and Overmans additionally maintains that "it seems entirely plausible, while not provable, that 700,000 German military personnel listed as missing actually died in Soviet custody."

== German POWs in the USSR ==
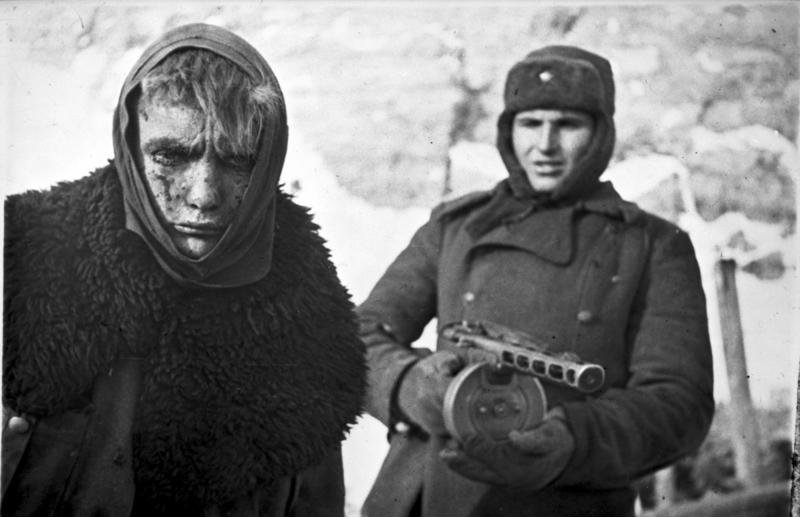
German prisoner taken during the Battle of Stalingrad, January 1943

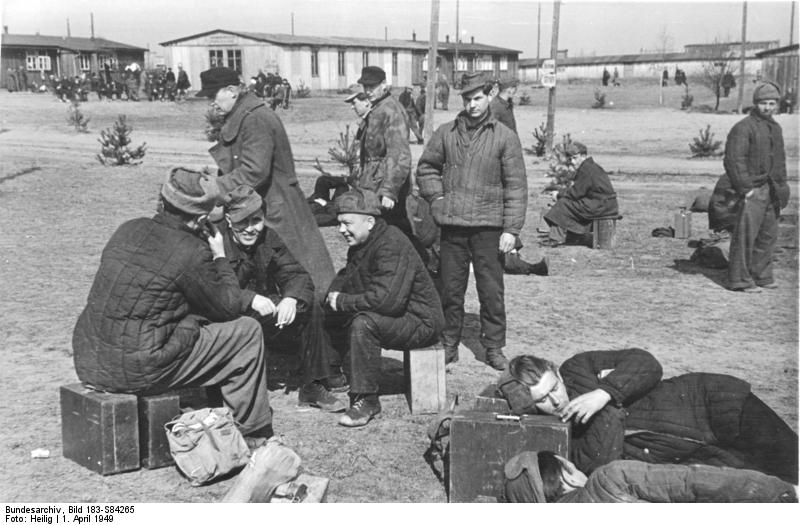
A group of recently repatriated German POWs at a transit camp in Frankfurt, 1949

In the first six months of Operation Barbarossa, few Germans were captured by Red Army forces. After the Battle of Moscow and the retreat of the German forces the number of prisoners in the POW camps of the Main Administration for Affairs of Prisoners of War and Internees rose to 120,000 by early 1942. The German 6th Army surrendered in the Battle of Stalingrad, 91,000 of the survivors became prisoners of war raising the number to 170,000 in early 1943, but 85,000 died in the months following their capture at Stalingrad, with only approximately 6,000 of them surviving to be repatriated after the war.

As the desperate economic situation in the Soviet Union eased in 1943, the mortality rate in the POW camps decreased. At the same time POWs became an important source of forced labor for the Soviet economy deprived of manpower. With the formation of the "National Committee for a Free Germany" and the "League of German Officers", POWs who cooperated with the Soviets received more privileges and better rations. As a result of Operation Bagration and the collapse on the southern part of the Eastern front, the number of German POWs nearly doubled in the second half of 1944. In the first months of 1945 the Red Army advanced to the Oder river and the Balkans. By April 1945 the number of POWs had risen to 2,000,000.

A total of 2.8 million Wehrmacht personnel were held as POWs by the Soviet Union at the end of the war, according to Soviet records. A large number of German POWs had been released by the end of 1946, when the Soviet Union held fewer POWs than the United Kingdom and France between them. With the creation of a pro-Soviet German state in the Soviet occupation zone of Germany (the German Democratic Republic) in October 1949, all but 85,000 POWs had been released and repatriated. Most of those still held had been convicted as war criminals and sentenced to long terms in forced labor camps, usually 25 years. It was not until 1956 that the last of these Kriegsverurteilte ('war convicts') were repatriated, following the intervention of West German Chancellor Konrad Adenauer in Moscow.

The Soviet Union released Austrian prisoners at a much faster rate than they released Germans, but the last Austrians were not released until 1955.

According to Richard Overy, Russian sources state that 356,000 out of 2,388,000 POWs died in Soviet captivity. In his revised Russian language edition of Soviet Casualties and Combat Losses, Krivosheev put the number of German military POWs at 2,733,739 and dead at 381,067 (356,700 German nationals and 24,367 from other nations). However, Soviet-era sources are disputed by historians in the West, who estimate 3.0 million German POWs were taken by the USSR and up to 1.0 million died in Soviet captivity. Waitman Wade Beorn states that 35.8 percent of German POWs died in Soviet custody, which is supported by other academic works.

According to Edward Peterson, the U.S. chose to hand over several hundred thousand German prisoners to the Soviet Union in May 1945 as a "gesture of friendship". Niall Ferguson maintains that "it is clear that many German units sought to surrender to the other Allied forces in preference the Red Army". Heinz Nawratil maintains that U.S. forces refused to accept the surrender of German troops in Saxony and Bohemia, and instead handed them over to the Soviet Union.

According to a report in the New York Times thousands of prisoners were transferred to Soviet authorities from POW camps in the West. It is known that 6,000 German officers were sent from the West to NKVD special camp Nr. 7 (site of the former Sachsenhausen concentration camp) and from there to POW camps. Soviet Ministry for the Interior documents released in 1990 listed 6,680 inmates in the NKVD special camps in Germany 1945–49 who were transferred to Soviet POW camps.

== German estimates ==
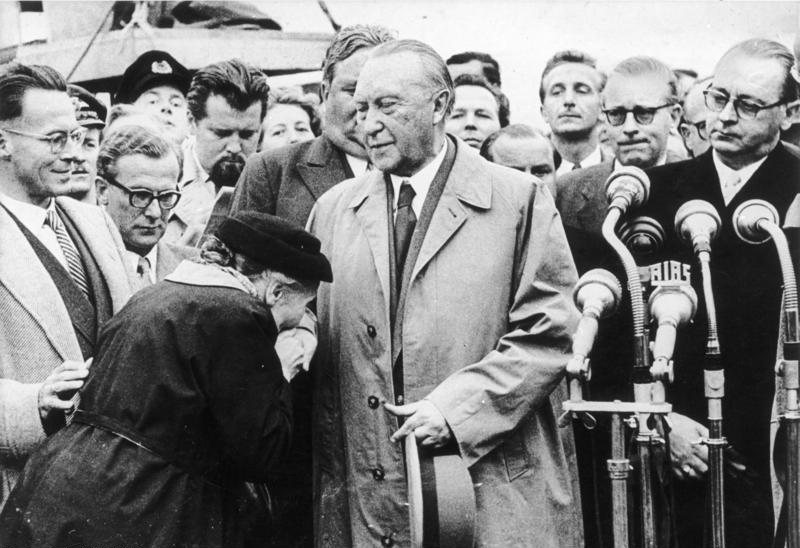
The mother of a prisoner thanks Chancellor Konrad Adenauer upon his return from Moscow on September 14, 1955. Adenauer had succeeded in concluding negotiations for the release to Germany by the end of the year of 15,000 German civilians and prisoners of war

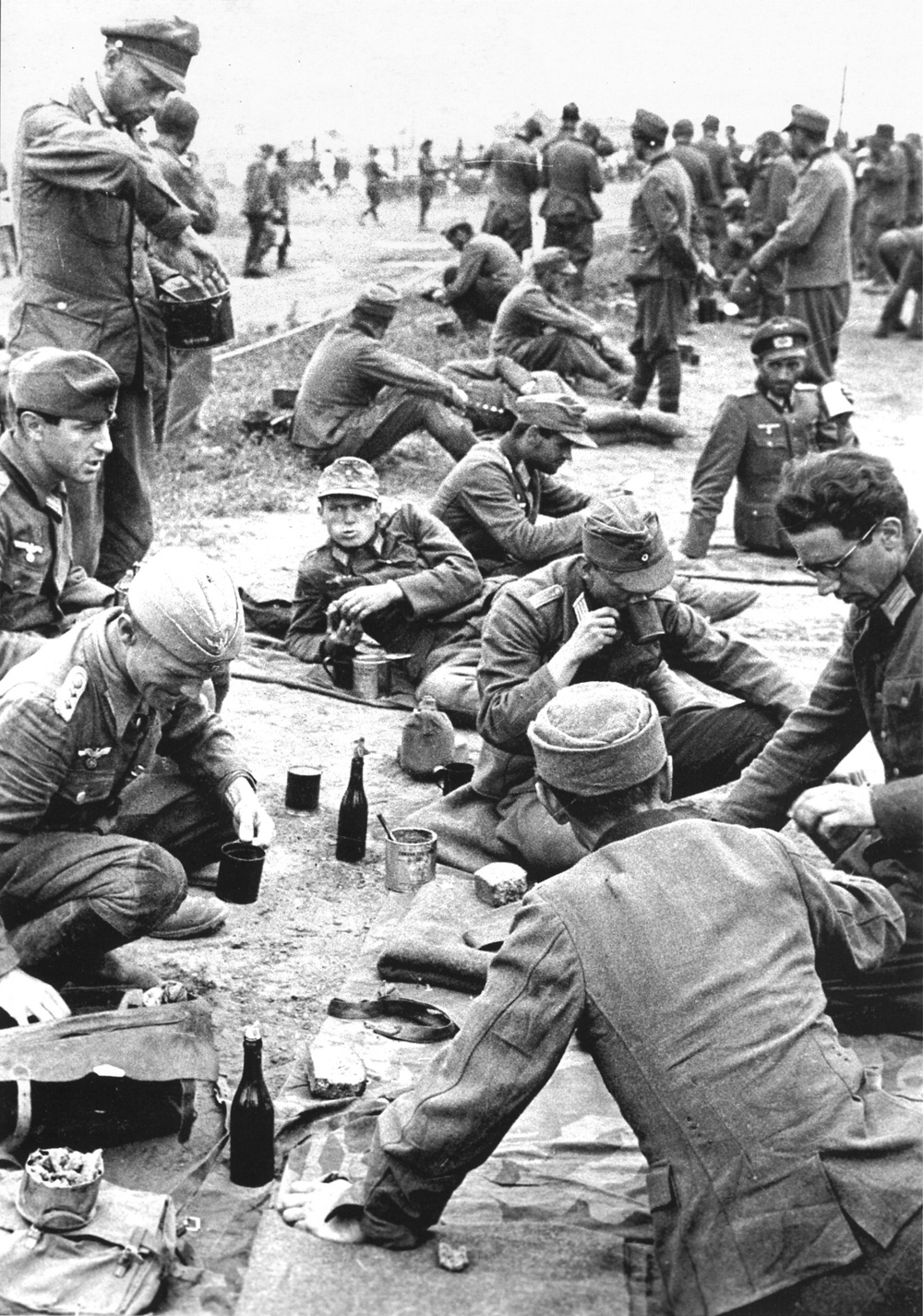
German officer POWs eating lunch in Krasnogorsk Special Camp No. 27, 1944.

The West German government set up a Commission headed by Erich Maschke to investigate the fate of German POWs in the war. In its report of 1974 they found that 3,060,000 German military personnel were taken prisoner by the USSR and that 1,094,250 died in captivity (549,360 from 1941 to April 1945; 542,911 from May 1945 to June 1950 and 1,979 from July 1950 to 1955). According to German historian Rüdiger Overmans ca. 3,000,000 POW were taken by the USSR; he put the "maximum" number of German POW deaths in Soviet hands at 1.0 million. Based on his research, Overmans believes that the deaths of 363,000 POWs in Soviet captivity can be confirmed by the files of Deutsche Dienststelle (WASt), and additionally maintains that "It seems entirely plausible, while not provable, that 700,000 German military personnel listed as missing actually died in Soviet custody".

German prisoners of war held by the Soviet Union
Year	Quarter	Number of German POWs
1941	IV	26,000
1942	I	120,000
	II	120,000
	III	110,000
	IV	100,000
1943	I	170,000
	II	160,000
	III	190,000
	IV	200,000
1944	I	240,000
	II	370,000
	III	560,000
	IV	560,000
1945	I	1,100,000
	II	2,000,000
	III	1,900,000
	IV	1,400,000
1946	IV	1,100,000
1947	IV	840,000
1948	IV	500,000
1949	IV	85,000
1950	IV	29,000

Source of figures: Rüdiger Overmans, Soldaten hinter Stacheldraht. Deutsche Kriegsgefangene des Zweiten Weltkriege. Ullstein., 2000 Page 246

== Soviet statistics ==
According to Russian historian Grigori F. Krivosheev, Soviet NKVD figures list 2,733,739 German "Wehrmacht" POWs (Военнопленные из войск вермахта) taken with 381,067 having died in captivity. The table below lists the Soviet statistics for total number of German prisoners of war reported by the NKVD as of 22 April 1956 (excluding USSR citizens who were serving in Wehrmacht). The Soviets considered ethnic Germans of Eastern Europe conscripted by Germany as nationals of their country of residence before the war, for example the Sudeten Germans were labelled as Czechs. These figures do not include prisoners from Italy, Hungary, Romania, Finland and Japan. The Soviet statistics for POW do not include conscripted civilians for the Forced labor of Germans in the Soviet Union.

However Austrian historian Stefan Karner maintains that Soviet era documents indicate that 2.6 million prisoners were taken by the Soviets including 400,000 civilians.

Figures for "Wehrmacht" POW according to Soviet NKVD

Nationality	Total accounted prisoners of war	Released and repatriated	Died in captivity	% Died in captivity
German	2,388,443	2,031,743	356,700	15%
Austrian	156,681	145,790	10,891	7%
Czech and Slovak	69,977	65,954	4,023	6%
French	23,136	21,811	1,325	6%
Yugoslav	21,830	20,354	1,476	7%
Polish	60,277	57,149	3,128	5%
Dutch	4,730	4,530	200	4%
Belgian	2,014	1,833	181	9%
Luxemburger	1,653	1,560	93	6%
Spanish	452	382	70	15%
Danish	456	421	35	8%
Norwegian	101	83	18	18%
others	3,989	1,062	2,927	73%
Total	2,733,739	2,352,672	381,067	13.9%

== See also ==
- German prisoners of war in Azerbaijan
- Forced labor of Germans in the Soviet Union
- German prisoners of war in the United States
- German prisoners of war in northwest Europe
- German mistreatment of Soviet prisoners of war
- Soviet atrocities committed against prisoners of war during World War II
