= Forced labour =

Work that employs people against their will

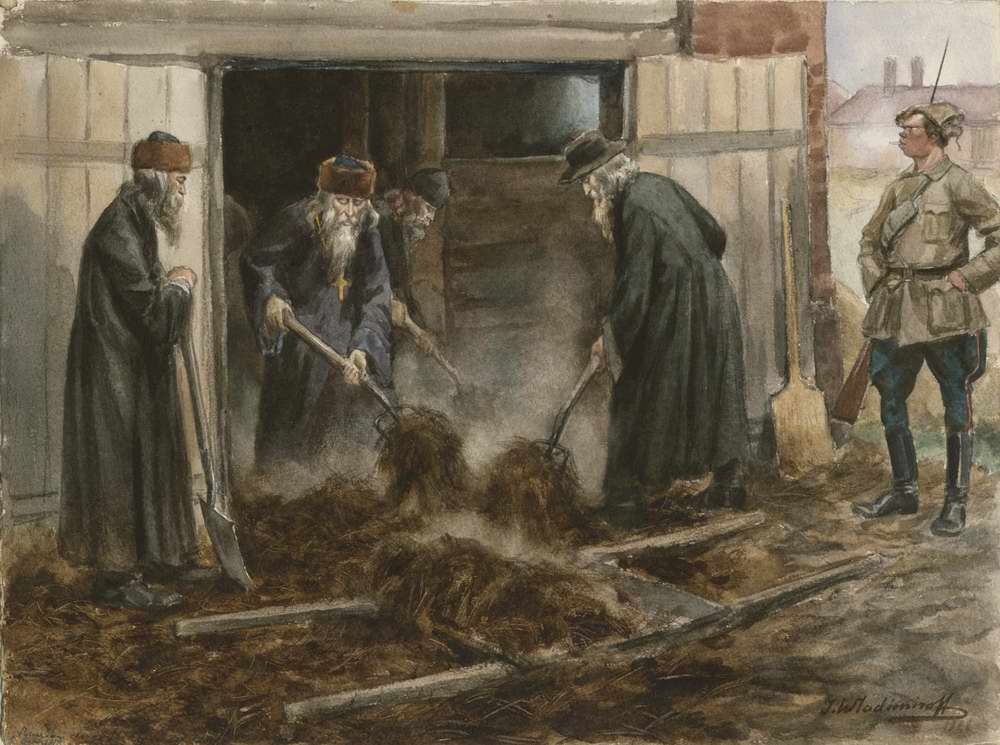
Clergy on forced labour, by Ivan Vladimirov (Soviet Russia, 1919)

Forced labor/labour, or unfree labor/labour, is any work relation, especially in modern or early modern history, in which people are employed against their will with the threat of destitution, detention, or violence, including death or other forms of extreme hardship to either themselves or members of their families.

Forced labour includes all forms of slavery, penal labour, and the corresponding institutions, such as debt slavery, serfdom, corvée and labour camps.

== Definition ==
Many forms of unfree labour are also covered by the term forced labour, which is defined by the International Labour Organization (ILO) as all involuntary work or service exacted under the menace of a penalty.

However, under the ILO Forced Labour Convention of 1930, the term forced or compulsory labour does not include:

- "any work or service exacted in virtue of compulsory military service laws for work of a purely military character;"
- "any work or service which forms part of the normal civic obligations of the citizens of a fully self-governing country;"
- "any work or service exacted from any person as a consequence of a conviction in a court of law, provided that the said work or service is carried out under the supervision and control of a public authority and that the said person is not hired to or placed at the disposal of private individuals, companies or associations (requiring that prison farms no longer do convict leasing)";
- "any work or service exacted in cases of emergency, that is to say, in the event of war, of a calamity or threatened calamity, such as fire, flood, famine, earthquake, violent epidemic or epizootic diseases, invasion by: animal, insect or vegetable pests, and in general any circumstance that would endanger the existence or the well-being of the whole or part of the population";

== Payment for unfree labour ==
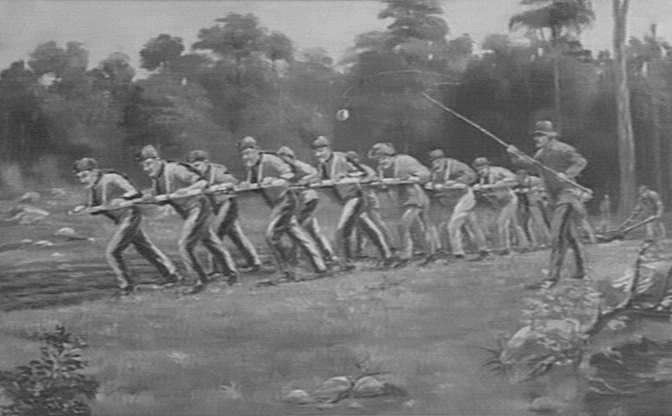
Convict labourers in Australia in the early 19th century

If payment occurs, it may be in one or more of the following forms:

- The payment does not exceed subsistence or barely exceeds it;
- The payment is in goods which are not desirable and/or cannot be exchanged or are difficult to exchange; or
- The payment wholly or mostly consists of cancellation of a debt or liability. This may have itself been coerced, or belongs to someone else.

Unfree labour is often more easily instituted and enforced on migrant workers, who have travelled far from their homelands and who are easily identified because of their physical, ethnic, linguistic, or cultural differences from the general population, since they are unable or unlikely to report their conditions to the authorities.

== Modern day unfree labour ==
Unfree labour re-emerged as an issue in the debate about rural development during the years following the end of the Second World War, when a political concern of Keynesian theory was not just economic reconstruction (mainly in Europe and Asia) but also planning (in developing "Third World" nations). A crucial aspect of the ensuing discussion concerned the extent to which different relational forms constituted obstacles to capitalist development, and why.

During the 1960s and 1970s, unfree labour was regarded as incompatible with capitalist accumulation, and thus an obstacle to economic growth, an interpretation advanced by exponents of the then-dominant semi-feudal thesis. From the 1980s onwards, however, another and very different Marxist view emerged, arguing that evidence from Latin America and India suggested agribusiness enterprises, commercial farmers and rich peasants reproduced, introduced or reintroduced unfree relations.

However, recent contributions to this debate have attempted to exclude Marxism from the discussion. These contributions maintain that, because Marxist theory failed to understand the centrality of unfreedom to modern capitalism, a new explanation of this link is needed. This claim has been questioned by Tom Brass. He argues that many of these new characteristics are in fact no different from those identified earlier by Marxist theory and that the exclusion of the latter approach from the debate is thus unwarranted.

The International Labour Organization (ILO) now estimates that at least 27.6 million people are victims of forced labour worldwide on any given day; 86% of forced labour is imposed by private actors: 63% in non-sexual sectors and 23% in commercial sexual exploitation. State authorities account for the remaining 14%. The forced labour prevalence of adult migrant workers is more than 3x higher than that of adult non-migrant workers. From an international law perspective, countries that allow forced labour are violating international labour standards as set forth in the Abolition of Forced Labour Convention (C105), one of the fundamental conventions of the ILO.

According to the ILO Special Action Programme to Combat Forced Labour (SAP-FL), global profits from forced trafficked labour exploited by private agents are estimated at US$44.3 billion per year. About 70% of this value (US$31.6 billion) comes from trafficked victims. At least the half of this sum (more than US$15 billion) comes from industrialised countries.

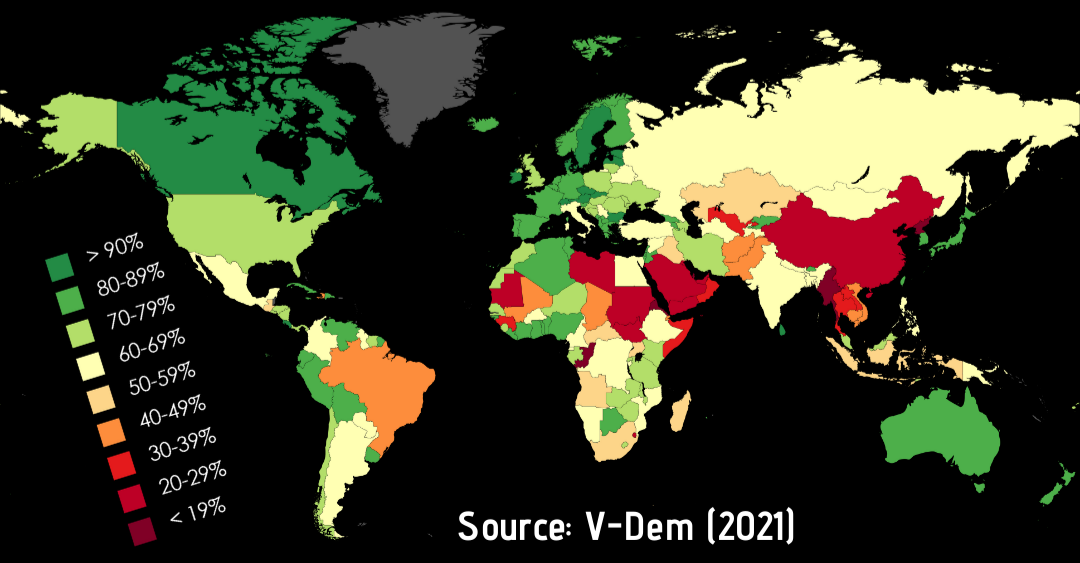
Freedom from forced labour by country (V-Dem Institute, 2021)

== Trafficking ==
Trafficking is a term to define the recruiting, harbouring, obtaining and transportation of a person by use of force, fraud, or coercion for the purpose of subjecting them to involuntary acts, such as acts related to commercial sexual exploitation (including forced prostitution) or involuntary labour.

== Forms of unfree labour ==
=== Slavery ===
Slavery was common in many ancient societies, including ancient Egypt, Babylon, Persia, ancient Greece, Rome, ancient China, the pre-modern Muslim world, as well as many societies in Africa and the Americas. Being sold into slavery was a common fate of populations that were conquered in wars.

Chattel slavery is an extreme form of unfree labour in which people are legally regarded as property for life and are subject to being bought, sold, or transferred by their owners, and typically receive no personal benefit from their work. One of the most widespread and systematized forms of chattel slavery occurred during the transatlantic slave trade between the 16th and 19th centuries. During this period, it is estimated that between 10 million and 12 million Black Africans were forcibly transported across the Atlantic Ocean to the Americas. Many were taken through the Middle Passage to Brazil, the Caribbean, and North America. In these systems, slavery was typically hereditary, with the legal status of enslavement passed from parent to child. Smaller numbers of enslaved Africans were brought to Europe, and others were also trafficked through the trans-Saharan and Indian Ocean slave trades. These systems varied significantly in structure, scale, and legal status and were not always chattel in form.

The term "slavery" is often applied to situations which do not meet the above definitions, but which are other, closely related forms of unfree labour, such as debt slavery or debt-bondage (although not all repayment of debts through labour constitutes unfree labour).

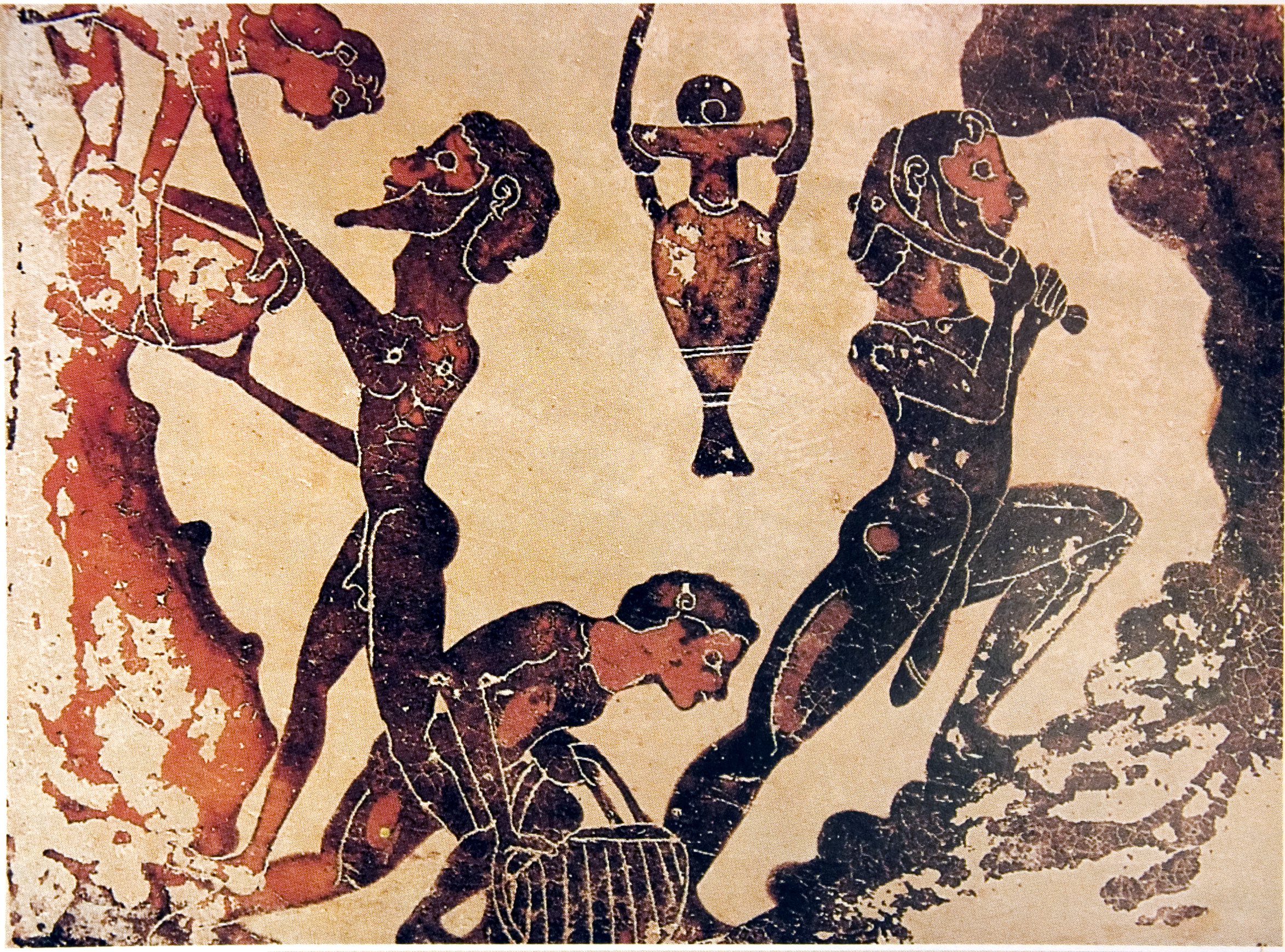
Mine workers in Ancient Greece were often slaves

In late 16th century Japan, "unfree labour" or slavery was officially banned; but forms of contract and indentured labour persisted alongside the period's penal codes' forced labour. Somewhat later, the Edo period's penal laws prescribed "non-free labour" for the immediate families of executed criminals in Article 17 of the Gotōke reijō (Tokugawa House Laws), but the practice never became common. The 1711 Gotōke reijō was compiled from over 600 statutes that were promulgated between 1597 and 1696.

According to Kevin Bales in Disposable People: New Slavery in the Global Economy (1999), there are now an estimated 27 million slaves in the world.

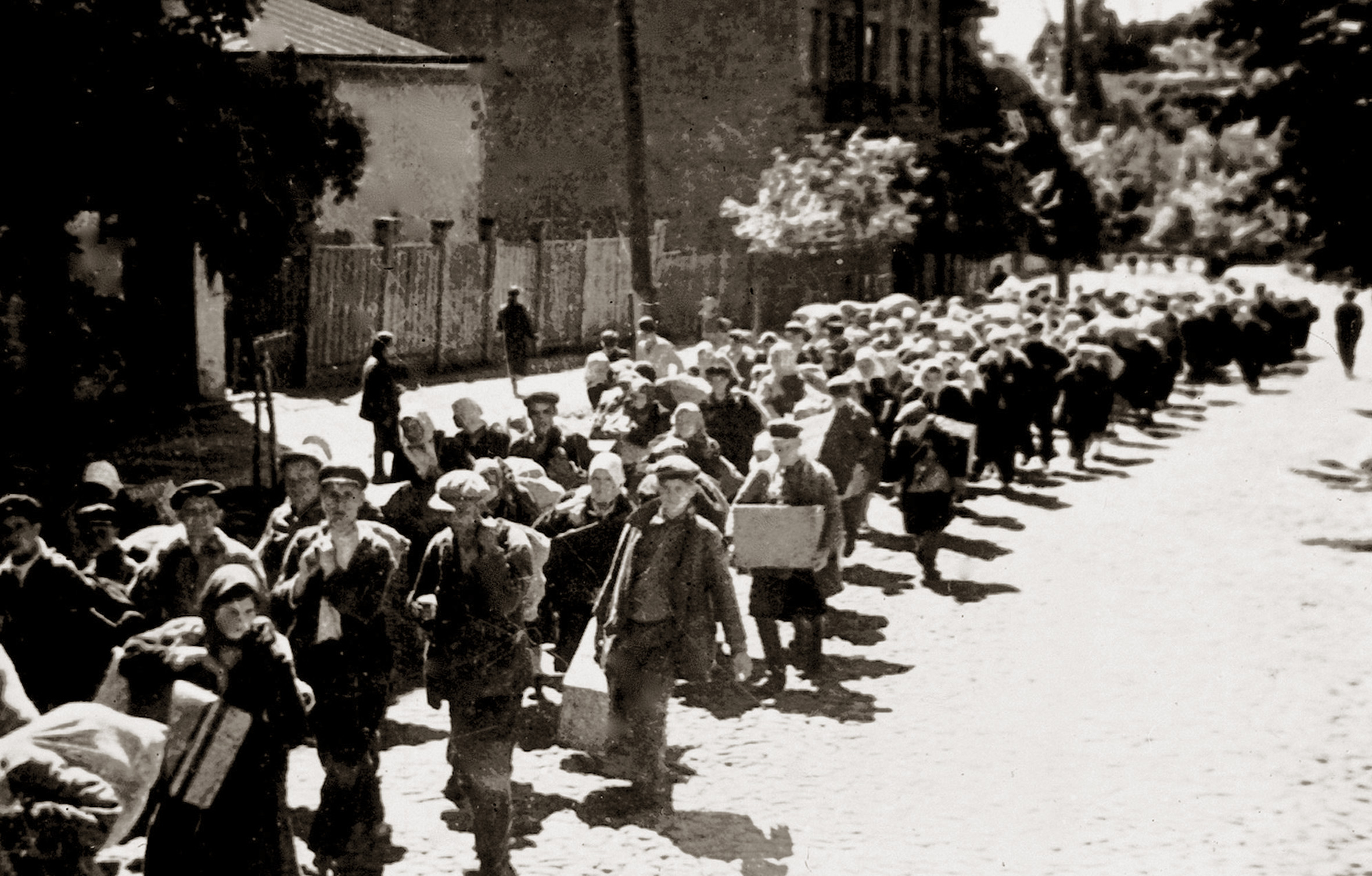
Ukrainian Ostarbeiters from Kyiv Oblast depart to Nazi Germany to serve as labor force, 1942

=== Serfdom ===
Serfdom bonds labourers to the land they farm, typically in a feudal society. Serfs typically have no legal right to leave, change employers, or seek paid work, though depending on economic conditions many did so anyway. Unlike chattel slaves, they typically cannot be sold separately from the land, and have rights such as the military protection of the lord.

=== Truck system ===
A truck system, in the specific sense in which the term is used by labour historians, refers to an unpopular or even exploitative form of payment associated with small, isolated and/or rural communities, in which workers or self-employed small producers are paid in either: goods, a form of payment known as truck wages, or tokens, private currency ("scrip") or direct credit, to be used at a company store, owned by their employers. A specific kind of truck system, in which credit advances are made against future work, is known in the U.S. as debt bondage.

Many scholars have suggested that employers use such systems to exploit workers and/or indebt them. This could occur, for example, if employers were able to pay workers with goods which had a market value below the level of subsistence, or by selling items to workers at inflated prices. Others argue that truck wages were a convenient way for isolated communities, such as during the early colonial settlement of North America, to operate when official currency was scarce.

By the early 20th century, truck systems were widely seen, in industrialised countries, as exploitative; perhaps the most well-known example of this view was a 1947 U.S. hit song "Sixteen Tons". Many countries have Truck Act legislation that outlaws truck systems and requires payment in cash.

=== Mandatory services due to social status ===
==== Corvée ====
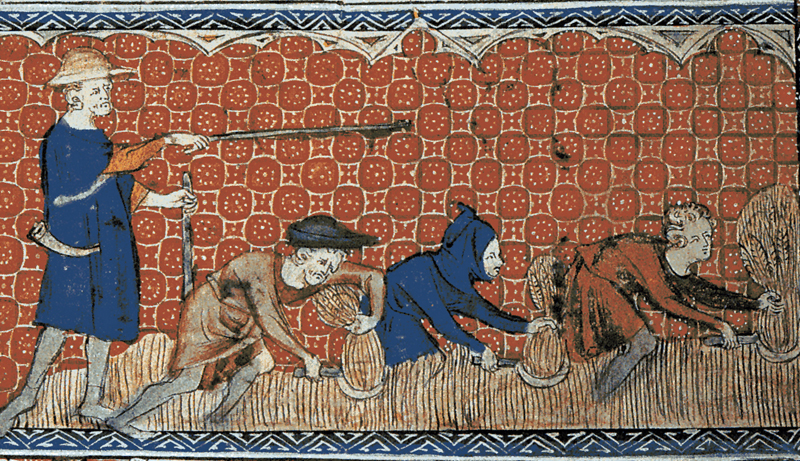
Depiction of socage on the royal demesne (miniature from the Queen Mary Psalter, c. 1310). British Library, London

Though most closely associated with Medieval Europe, governments throughout human history have imposed regular short stints of unpaid labour upon lower social classes. These might be annual obligations of a few weeks or something similarly regular that lasted for the labourer's entire working life. As the system developed in the Philippines and elsewhere, the labourer could pay an appropriate fee and be exempted from the obligation.

==== Vetti-chakiri ====
A form of forced labour in which peasants and members of lower castes were required to work for free existed in India before independence. This form of labour was known by several names, including veth, vethi, vetti-chakiri and begar .

=== Penal labour ===
==== Labour camps ====
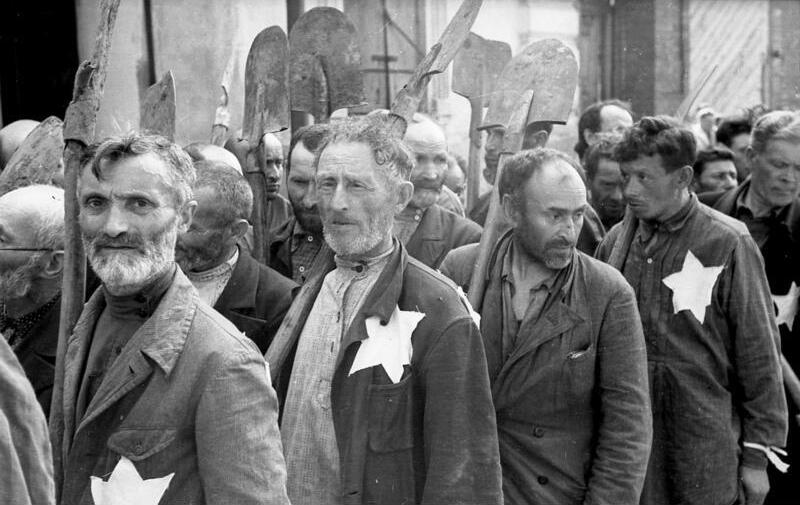
Jewish forced labourers during the Holocaust in Mogilev, German-occupied Belarus, July 1941.

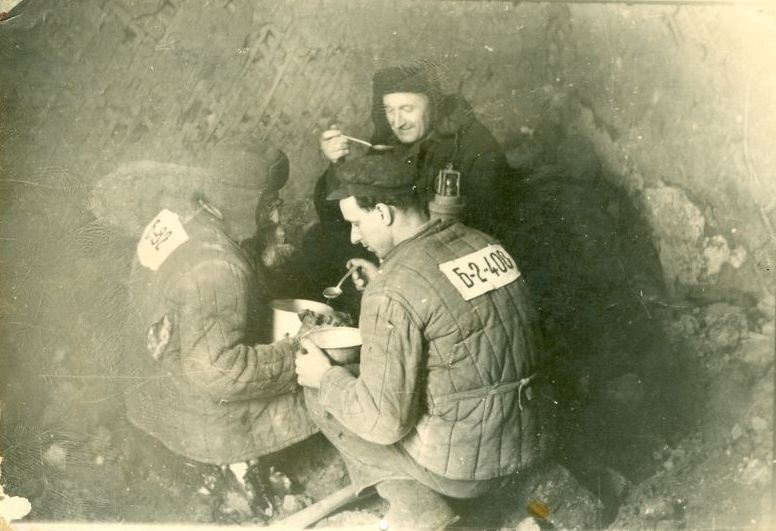
Political prisoners eating lunch in a Gulag camp, 1955.

Another historically significant example of forced labour was that of political prisoners, people from conquered or occupied countries, members of persecuted minorities, and prisoners of war, especially during the 20th century. The best-known example of this are the concentration camp system run by Nazi Germany in Europe during World War II, the Gulag camps run by the Soviet Union, and the forced labour used by the military of the Empire of Japan, especially during the Pacific War (such as the Burma Railway). Roughly 4,000,000 German POWs were used as "reparations labour" by the Allies for several years after the German surrender; this was permitted under the Third Geneva Convention provided they were accorded proper treatment. China's laogai ("labour reform") system and North Korea's kwalliso camps are current examples.

About 12 million forced labourers, most of whom were Poles and Soviet citizens (Ost-Arbeiter) were employed in the German war economy inside Nazi Germany. More than 2000 German companies profited from slave labour during the Nazi era, including Daimler, Deutsche Bank, Siemens, Volkswagen, Hoechst, Dresdner Bank, Krupp, Allianz, BASF, Bayer, BMW, and Degussa. In particular, Germany's Jewish population was subject to slave labour prior to their extermination.

In Asia, according to a joint study of historians featuring Zhifen Ju, Mark Peattie, Toru Kubo, and Mitsuyoshi Himeta, more than 10 million Chinese were mobilised by the Japanese army and enslaved by the Kōa-in for slave labour in Manchukuo and north China. The U.S. Library of Congress estimates that in Java, between 4 and 10 million romusha (Japanese: "manual labourer") were forced to work by the Japanese military. About 270,000 of these Javanese labourers were sent to other Japanese-held areas in South East Asia. Only 52,000 were repatriated to Java, meaning that there was a death rate of 80%. Also, 6.87 million Koreans were forcefully put into slave labour from 1939 to 1945 in both Japan and Japanese-occupied Korea.

Kerja rodi (Heerendiensten), was the term for forced labour in Indonesia under Dutch colonial rule.

The Khmer Rouge attempted to turn Cambodia into a classless society by depopulating cities and forcing the urban population ("New People") into agricultural communes. The entire population was forced to become farmers in labour camps.

==== Prison labour ====
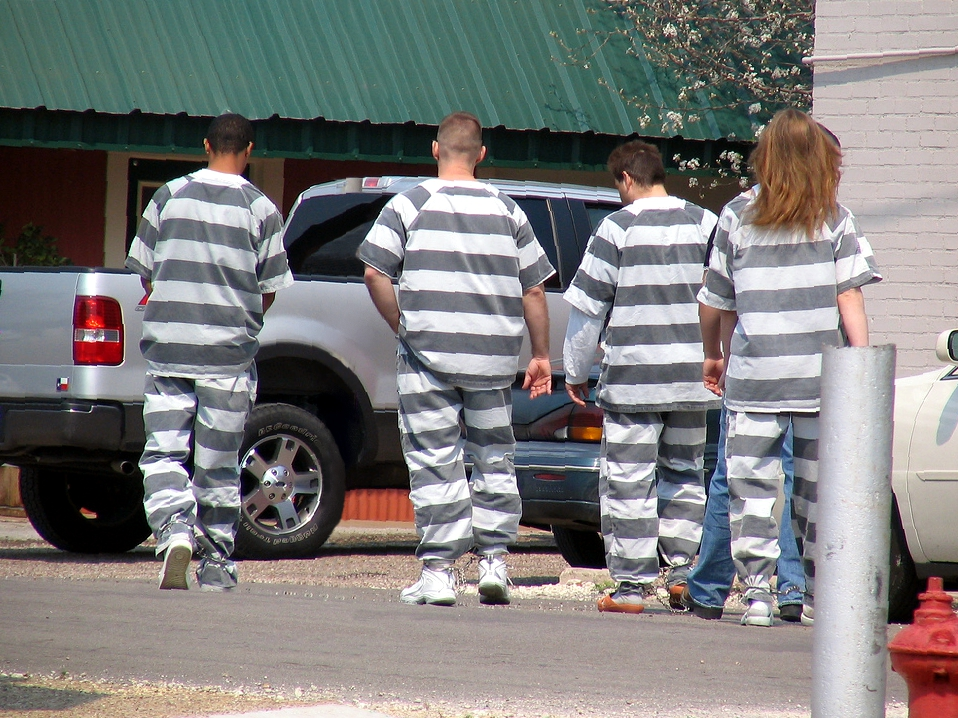
American prisoner "chain gang" labourers, 2006. Notice the shackles on the feet of the prisoners.

Convict or prison labour is another classic form of unfree labour. The forced labour of convicts has often been regarded with lack of sympathy, because of the social stigma attached to people regarded as common criminals.

Three British colonies in Australia – New South Wales, Van Diemen's Land and Western Australia – are examples of the state use of convict labour. Australia received thousands of convict labourers in the eighteenth and nineteenth centuries who were given sentences for crimes ranging from those now considered to be minor misdemeanours to such serious offences as murder, rape and incest. A considerable number of Irish convicts were sentenced to transportation for treason while fighting against British rule in Ireland.

More than 165,000 convicts were transported to Australian colonies from 1788 to 1868. Most British or Irish convicts who were sentenced to transportation, however, completed their sentences in British jails and were not transported at all.

It is estimated that in the last 50 years more than 50 million people have been sent to Chinese laogai camps.

=== Indentured and bonded labour ===
A more common form in modern society is indenture, or bonded labour, under which workers sign contracts to work for a specific period of time, for which they are paid only with accommodation and sustenance, or these essentials in addition to limited benefits such as cancellation of a debt, or transportation to a desired country.

=== Contemporary illegal forced labour ===
While historically unfree labour was frequently sanctioned by law, in the present day most unfree labour now revolves around illegal control rather than legal ownership, as all countries have made slavery illegal.

=== Permitted exceptions ===
There are several exceptions of unfree or forced labour permitted by the Forced Labour Convention.

==== Civil conscription ====
Some countries practise forms of civil conscription for different major occupational groups or inhabitants under different denominations like civil conscription, civil mobilization, political mobilisation etc. This obligatory service on the one hand has been implemented due to long-lasting labour strikes, during wartime or economic crisis, to provide basic services like medical care, food supply or supply of the defence industry. On the other hand, this service can be obligatory to provide recurring and inevitable services to the population, like fire services, due to lack of volunteers.

===== Temporary civil conscription =====
Between December 1943 and March 1948 young men in the United Kingdom, the so-called Bevin Boys, had been conscripted for the work in coal mines. In Belgium in 1964, in Portugal and in Greece from 2010 to 2014 due to the severe economic crisis, a system of civil mobilisation was implemented to provide public services as a national interest.

===== Recurring civil conscription =====
In Switzerland in most communities for all inhabitants, no matter if they are Swiss or not, it is mandatory to join the so-called Militia Fire Brigades, as well as the obligatory service in Swiss civil defence and protection force. Conscripts in Singapore are providing the personnel of the country's fire service as part of the national service in the Civil Defence Force. In Austria and Germany citizens have to join a compulsory fire brigade if a volunteer fire service can not be provided, due to lack of volunteers. In 2018 this regulation is executed only in a handful of communities in Germany and currently none in Austria.

==== Conscription for military service and security forces ====
Beside the conscription for military services, some countries draft citizens for paramilitary or security forces, like internal troops, border guards or police forces. While sometimes paid, conscripts are not free to decline enlistment. Draft dodging or desertion are often met with severe punishment. Even in countries which prohibit other forms of unfree labour, conscription is generally justified as being necessary in the national interest and therefore is one of the five exceptions to the Forced Labour Convention, signed by the most countries in the world.

==== Mandatory community service ====
===== Community services =====
Community service is a non-paying job performed by one person or a group of people for the benefit of their community or its institutions. Community service is distinct from volunteering, since it is not always performed on a voluntary basis. Although personal benefits may be realised, it may be performed for a variety of reasons including citizenship requirements, a substitution of criminal justice sanctions, requirements of a school or class, and requisites for the receipt of certain benefits.

===== De facto obligatory community work =====
During the Cold War in some communist countries like Czechoslovakia, the German Democratic Republic or the Soviet Union the originally voluntary work on Saturday for the community called Subbotnik, Voskresnik or Akce Z became de facto obligatory for the members of a community.

===== Hand and hitch-up services =====
In some Austrian and German states it is feasible for communities to draft citizens for public services, called hand and hitch-up services. This mandatory service is still executed to maintain the infrastructure of small communities.

== International conventions ==
- ILO "Forced Labour Convention, 1930 (No. 29)"
- ILO "Abolition of Forced Labour Convention, 1957 (No. 105)"
- ILO "Minimum Age Convention, 1973 (No. 138)"
- OHCHR "Worst Forms of Child Labour Convention, 1999 (No. 182)"

== See also ==
- Arbeit macht frei
- Coolie
- Coming home to liberated France (World War II)
- Construction soldier
- Critique of work
- Debt bondage
- Exploitation of labour
- Forced labour under German rule during World War II
- Forced labor of Germans after World War II
- Gulag
- Human trafficking
- Involuntary servitude
- Indentured servitude
- Labor army
- Labour battalion
- Labor trafficking in the United States
- List of concentration and internment camps
- NKVD labor columns
- Orwellian
- Penal labour
- Refusal of work
- SAP-FL, the ILO Special Action Programme to Combat Forced Labour
- Sexual slavery
- Shanghaiing
- Sweatshop
- Trafficking of children
- Wage slavery
- Workfare
- Workhouse
