= Forced labor of Hungarians in the Soviet Union =

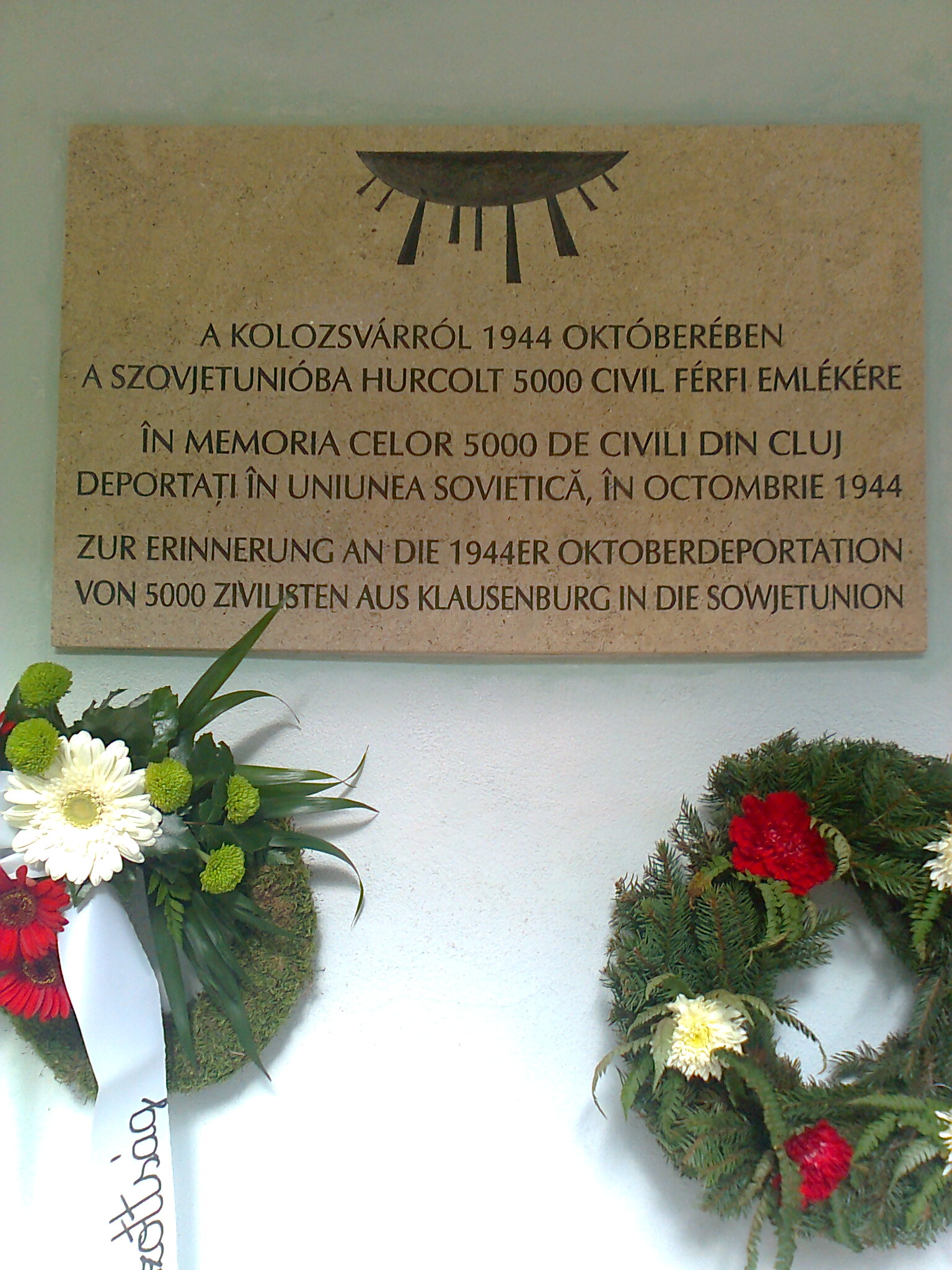
Memorial plaque for forced labour of Hungarians in the Soviet Union

The forced labour of Hungarians in the Soviet Union in the aftermath of World War II was not researched until the fall of Communism and the dissolution of the Soviet Union. While exact numbers are not known, it is estimated that up to 600,000 Hungarians were deported, including an estimated 200,000 civilians. An estimated 200,000 perished. Hungarian forced labour was part of a larger system of foreign forced labour in the Soviet Union.

In addition, an unknown number of Hungarians were deported from Transylvania to the Soviet Union in the context of the Romania-Hungary Transylvanian dispute. In 1944, many Hungarians were accused by Romanians of being "partisans" and transferred to the Soviet administration. In early 1945, during the "de-Germanisation" campaign all Hungarians with German names were sent to the Soviet Union, in accordance with Soviet Order 7161.

== POWs and civilians ==
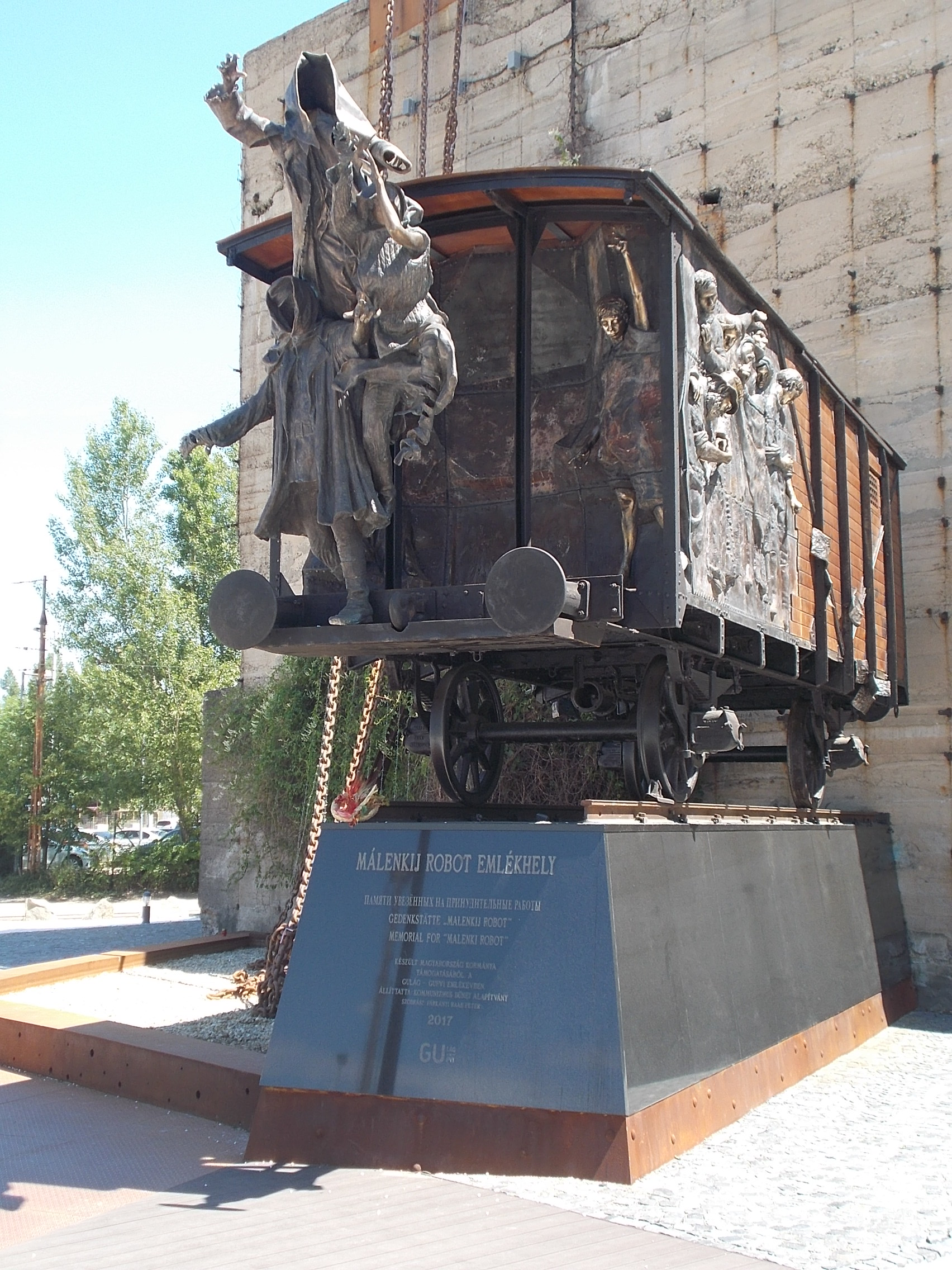
Forced labor of Hungarians in the Soviet Union Memorial Place, Budapest, Hungary

In Hungary and among the Hungarian minority of Transcarpathia, such forced labour has been referred to as málenkij robot, a corrupted form of the Russian malenkaya rabota (маленькая работа), meaning "little work". The expression originated during the first wave of deportations of Hungarian civilians: after occupation of Hungarian towns, civilians were rounded up for "little work", the removal of ruins. The largest single deportation of the first wave occurred in Budapest. Soviet Marshal Rodion Malinovsky's reports allegedly overestimated the number of prisoners of war taken after the Battle of Budapest, and to make up for the shortfall, some 100,000 civilians were detained in Budapest and its suburbs. Those deported in the first wave were mainly located in northwestern Hungary, in the path of the advancing Red Army.

The second, more organised wave occurred 1–2 months later, in January 1945, and involved people from across Hungary. According to Soviet State Defence Committee Order 7161, ethnic Germans were to be deported for forced labour from the occupied territories, including Hungary. Soviet authorities had deportation quotas for each region, and when the target was missed, it was completed with ethnic Hungarians. Hungarian prisoners of war were also deported during this period.

POWs and civilians were handled by the NKVD's Main Department for Affairs of POWs and Internees (known by its Russian acronym, GUPVI), with its own system of labour camps, similar to the Gulag.

Deportees were transported in freight cars to transit camps in Romania and Western Ukraine. Survivor testimony suggests a high death rate in the camps and in transit from various causes, including epidemic dysentery, harsh weather, and malnutrition.

In the Soviet Union, Hungarians were placed in approximately 2,000 camps. A large number of camps were subsequently identified: 44 camps in Azerbaijan, 158 in the Baltic states, 131 in Belarus, 119 in Northern Russia, 53 in the vicinity of Leningrad, 627 in Central Russia, 276 in the Ural Mountains and 64 in Siberia.

== Political prisoners ==
Another group of deportees consisted of Hungarians sentenced by Soviet tribunals for "anti-Soviet activities". These included the following categories:

- Former soldiers who had served in occupation forces in Soviet territory
- Members of the Levente paramilitary youth organisation who were made to serve in auxiliary forces by the end of the war
- High-ranking and lower ranking officials of public administration and all kind of non-leftist members of local governments or members of the parliament, who served during the "capitalist era" (incl. interwar period or even pre-WW1 era.)

This group of prisoners was sent to Gulag camps, rather than the GUPVI camp network.

During de-Stalinisation, the sentences of the survivors were annulled and 3,500 former convicts returned home. The total number of convicts was estimated by the Szorakész organisation of Hungarian Gulag survivors to be approximately 10,000.

== Return ==
The government of Ferenc Nagy started negotiations for the return of Hungarian deportees in early 1946. The first wave of widespread returns occurred June to November 1946, and was interrupted until May 1947. The last group of Hungarians to return, numbering about 3,000, was only able to do so in 1953–1955, after Joseph Stalin's death. Hungarian sources estimate that 330,000-380,000 forced labourers returned in total, leaving an estimated 200,000 who perished in transit or captivity.

== Media representations ==
The story of the forced labor program was told in the 2018 drama film Eternal Winter, which won an international Emmy for best actress.

== See also ==
- Foreign forced labour in the Soviet Union
