= Sabato fascista =

Concept used in fascist Italy

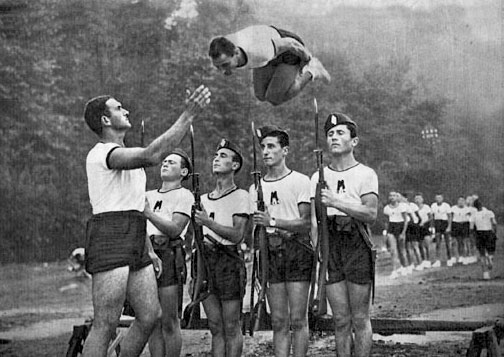
The exercise in courage during a sabato fascista

In Fascist Italy, the concept of sabato fascista ("Fascist Saturday") meant that Italians were expected to use Saturday afternoons engaged in cultural, sporting, paramilitary and political activities. This concept was established by the Italian Fascist Grand Council on 16 February 1935, the draft decree about its establishment was approved by the Italian Council of Ministers on June 15, 1935 and it was signed into the law by Benito Mussolini on June 20, 1935.

According to Tracy H. Koon, this scheme failed as most Italians preferred to spend Saturday as a day of rest. The Secretary of the National Fascist Party, Achille Starace, repeatedly complained about Italians' lack of participation.

== See also ==
- Civil conscription
- Subbotnik
- Working Saturday
