= Deportation of Germans from Romania after World War II =

Traditionally German (Saxon or Swabian) territories in Transylvania.

The deportation of Germans from Romania after World War II, conducted on Soviet order early in 1945, uprooted about 70,000 of Romania's Germans to the USSR; at least 3,000 of the deportees died before release. The deportation was part of the Soviet plan for German war reparations in the form of forced labor, according to the 1944 secret Soviet Order 7161. Most of the survivors returned to Romania between late 1945 and 1952, with a smaller part settling in various parts of Germany.

== Germans in Romania ==
German-speaking populations arrived on the territory of present-day Romania in different waves or stages of settlement, initially as early as the High Middle Ages, firstly to southern and northeastern Transylvania then subsequently during the Modern Age in other Habsburg-ruled lands such as Banat or Bukovina.

== Various plans for the transfer of the German population ==
Plans for transfer of the German population from Romania to Germany existed at least since 1939, but were abandoned during World War II. The idea re-emerged, at the proposal of the German government, after Romania left the Axis and joined the Allies. The proposal was received favourably by the Romanian foreign minister Grigore Niculescu-Buzești and the Sănătescu government, the only opposition coming from the representatives of the Communist Party. The proposal was put forward to the Soviets for approval during the armistice negotiations in Moscow, but was bluntly rejected, as the Soviets feared such a transfer would only serve to strengthen the Wehrmacht.

The Romanian authorities, however, continued to study the possibility of a mass expulsion, and prepared a bill that would have left a large number of Germans without Romanian citizenship.

== Soviet deportation order ==
On January 6, 1945. Romania's Soviet occupiers issued an order providing for the mobilisation of all the German inhabitants of Romania, with a view toward deporting many of them to the Soviet Union. The deportation order applied to all men between the ages of 17 and 45 and women between 18 and 30. Only pregnant women, women with children less than a year old and persons unable to work were excluded.

This was done to put into effect top secret Order 7161 about mobilisation and internment of able-bodied Germans for reparation works in the USSR, which also applied to other countries that were under the control of the Red Army, such as Hungary and Yugoslavia.

== Official position of the Rădescu government ==
Despite their own previous planning for a mass expulsion, the last non-communist government of Romania, headed by Prime Minister Nicolae Rădescu, declared itself "completely surprised" by the order (Note: But see the "1995 revelations" section below) On January 13, 1945, when arrests had already begun in Bucharest and Brașov, the Rădescu government sent a protest note to the (Soviet) Vice-President of the Allied Control Commission for Romania, General Vladislav Petrovich Vinogradov. This note explained that the armistice treaty (signed on September 12, 1944) did not envision expulsions and that Romanian industry would suffer following the deportation of so much of its workforce, and especially of a high percentage of its skilled workforce, to be found among its German population. In closing, Rădescu raised humanitarian concerns regarding the fate of women and children left behind.

== Statistics ==
Statistics regarding the expulsion of Transylvanian Saxons indicate that up to 30,336 individuals were deported to the Soviet Union — some 15% of Transylvania's German population (according to 1941 data). 12% of expellees were outside the age limits provided for in the deportation order; a 13-year-old girl was deported, as were people aged 55. 90% of expellees ended up in the Ukrainian SSR (the areas of Dnipropetrovsk, Stalino and Voroshilovgrad), the rest in the Urals. (see Forced labor of Germans in the Soviet Union for more background.)

The expellees were received in 85 camps. A third worked in mines, a quarter in construction, the rest in industry, agriculture or camp administration. Very few were given the jobs they had done in Romania.

The first expellees unsuited for work were returned to Transylvania at the end of 1945. Between 1946 and 1947, about 5,100 Saxons were brought, by special transports for the sick, to Frankfurt an der Oder, a city then in the Soviet occupation zone of Germany.

3,076 of the deportees died while in the USSR, three quarters of them being male. When they were freed, a quarter of deportees were sent to Germany, of whom just a seventh returned to Transylvania.

The highest number of deaths occurred in 1947. Starting in 1948, the situation improved, with a dramatic drop in the number of sick and dead expellees.

In 1948, those able to work also began to be freed from the camps (49% of them), so that in October 1949 the camps were shut down. The last third of the expellees returned to Transylvania. Of those brought to the Soviet occupation zone, around half received permission to return home. The rest moved elsewhere (mostly to West Germany), but a few remained in East Germany.

Between 1950 and 1952, 202 expellees were allowed to return home. According to Soviet documents, seven expellees chose to remain in the USSR.

Further turmoil came for Romania's ethnic Germans (this time mainly Banat Swabians) during the Bărăgan deportations of the 1950s.

== 1995 revelations ==
An article in the newspaper Allgemeine Deutsche Zeitung für Rumänien, published on January 13, 1995, revealed that the Romanian government was not in fact "completely surprised" by the deportation order. In fact, even before receiving the order, the government had ordered that lists of men and women capable of performing hard labour be drawn up. Weeks in advance, the state railway, Căile Ferate Române, had begun to prepare cattle wagons to transport the deportees. Documents uncovered after 1989 show that the deportations were planned in detail: as early as December 19, 1944, the prime minister's office transmitted orders by telephone to police inspectors for the purpose of registering the work-capable German population, to comply with the Soviet Order 7161 issued 3 days earlier.

All Red Army groups had orders to bring a certain number of work-capable ethnic Germans to camps, and then to deport them to the Soviet Union - this mission was accomplished with the Romanian authorities' assistance, as well as by Red Army units and GRU agents.

== In fiction ==
- Virgil Gheorghiu's novel The 25th Hour deals with the expulsion, as does the eponymous film.
- Herta Müller (Nobel Prize 2009) The Hunger Angel.

== See also ==
- Expulsion of Germans from Czechoslovakia
- Flight and expulsion of Germans from Poland during and after World War II
