= Journey Back to Youth =

2001 film by Alexander Gutman

- Путешествие в юность
- Directed by: Alexander Gutman; Sergey Litvyakov
- Release date: 2001
- Country: Russia

Journey Back to Youth (Russian: Путешествие в юность, Puteshestvie v yunost) is a 2001 documentary film by Russian film makers Alexander Gutman and Sergey Litvyakov. The film is an interview of four German women (Charlotte Kaufmann, Traute Sommer, Adelheid Imhof, Dora Birk) who tell the story of four young German girls from East Prussia placed into a Soviet labor camp at the end of World War II according the Yalta Conference decision about mobilization of Germans for reconstruction works in the USSR as a form or war reparations by the Germany, implemented according to the Soviet top secret Order 7161.

The film won the Platinum Award at the 34th International Independent Film Festival (Worldfest) in Houston, Texas, in 2001 and the "Gold Camera Award" at the US International Film and Video Festival in 2001.

== Film history ==
The film maker, Gutman, said that he got the idea for the film when he learned that the Heinrich Böll Foundation funded a monument in Petrozavodsk, Karelia at the graveyard of German women who died in the local GULAG camp.
