= Alexander Gutman =

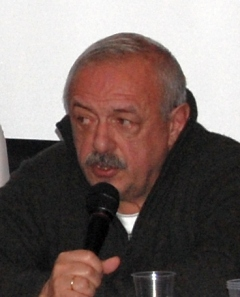

Alexander Ilyich Gutman (Russian: Алекса́ндр Ильи́ч Гу́тман; 29 January 1945 – 17 February 2016), also spelt as Alexandre Goutman and Aleksandr Gutman, was a Russian film director of Jewish origin. During a 30-year career, Gutman shot over 50 documentary films, 13 of them as film director. He won awards at several Russian and international film festivals.

He graduated from the Leningrad Polytechnical Institute (now known as St. Petersburg State Polytechnic University) (1968) and VGIK (1978).

== Filmography ==
Movies

Film
Year	Film	Role	Notes
2009	17 Avgusta	Director, writer, cinematographer	Documentary
2008	BAM: Railroad to Nowhere	Production Manager	Documentary
2005	In Search of Happiness	Director	Movie
2004	The Sunny Side of the Road	Director	Movie
2003	Frescoes about Armenia (presented at the 2003 Sundance Film Festival)	Director, writer, producer	TV movie documentary
2001	Thieves' World	Production manager	Movie documentary
2001	Journey Back to Youth	Director	Movie
2001	Three Days and Never Again	Director	Documentary
1997	The Wall	Camera operator	TV movie documentary
1996	Up to the Neck or Bodybuilding	Director	Movie
1994	1244, 1245, 1246	Director	Movie
1991	The Russians Have Gone	Director	Movie
