= Order 7161 =

Soviet order about forced labor of Germans in the wake of World War II

Order 7161 is the top secret USSR State Defense Committee Order no 7161ss (Постановление No. 7161cc ГКО СССР) of December 16, 1944 about mobilisation and internment of able-bodied Germans for reparation works in the USSR. (The Cyrillic "cc" after the order number is the Russian abbreviation for "top secret".) It was part of the organisation of forced labor of Germans in the Soviet Union since the ending period of World War II.

Order 7161 instructed recipients to intern all able-bodied Germans of ages 17–45 (men) and 18-30 (women) residing within the territories of Romania (69,332 persons), Hungary (31,923 persons), Yugoslavia (10,935 persons), Czechoslovakia (215 persons) and Bulgaria (75 persons), which were under the control of the Red Army, for deportation to the Soviet Union in order to perform manual, reparation works.

The order remained secret in the Soviet-dominated eastern bloc until the dissolution of the USSR.

The implementation of the order was assigned to the NKVD secret police and was taken up by its department of the Main Administration for Affairs of Prisoners of War and Internees (Russian abbreviation: GUPVI).

== See also ==
- Deportation of Germans from Romania after World War II
- Forced labor of Germans in the Soviet Union
- Journey Back to Youth
