= Parade of the Vanquished =

Soviet parade of German POWs in Moscow (1944)

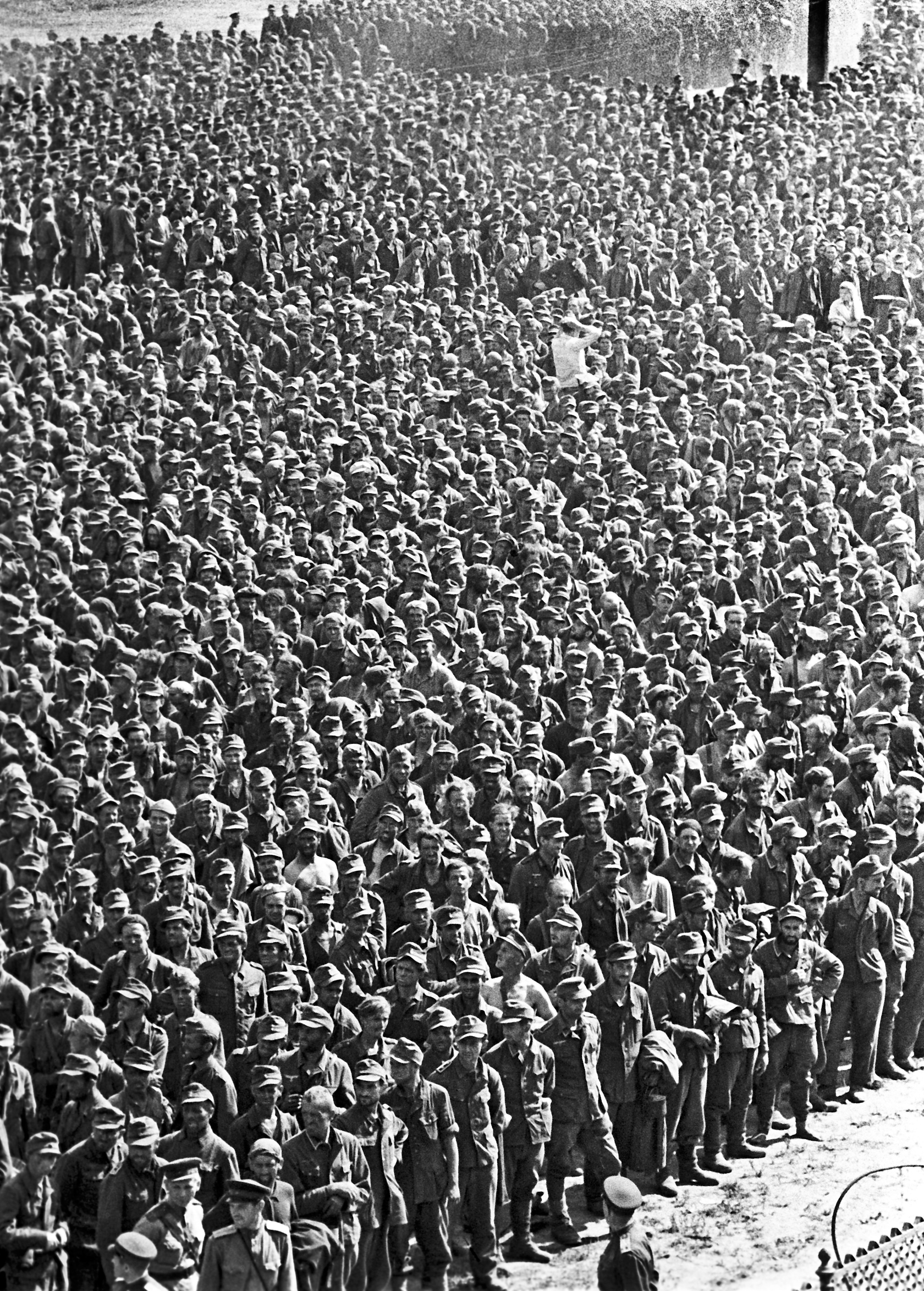
German prisoners of war paraded in Moscow

Soviet newsreel on the Parade of the Vanquished

The Parade of the Vanquished (Russian: Парад побеждëнных, romanized: Parad pobezhdyonnykh), also known as The Defeat Parade or Great Waltz (Russian: Парад поражения, romanized: Parad porazheniya), was a march of German prisoners of war on 17 July 1944 in Moscow. The parade was a result of the ongoing Operation Bagration on the Eastern Front, during World War II. Large numbers of German troops were held captive by the Soviets, and the operation was considered a turning point in the war and represented the largest losses of German troops. Approximately 57,000 captured troops were chosen, organized and paraded in Moscow. The parade was used by Soviet leader Joseph Stalin to demonstrate the success of the operation.
