= Action Z =

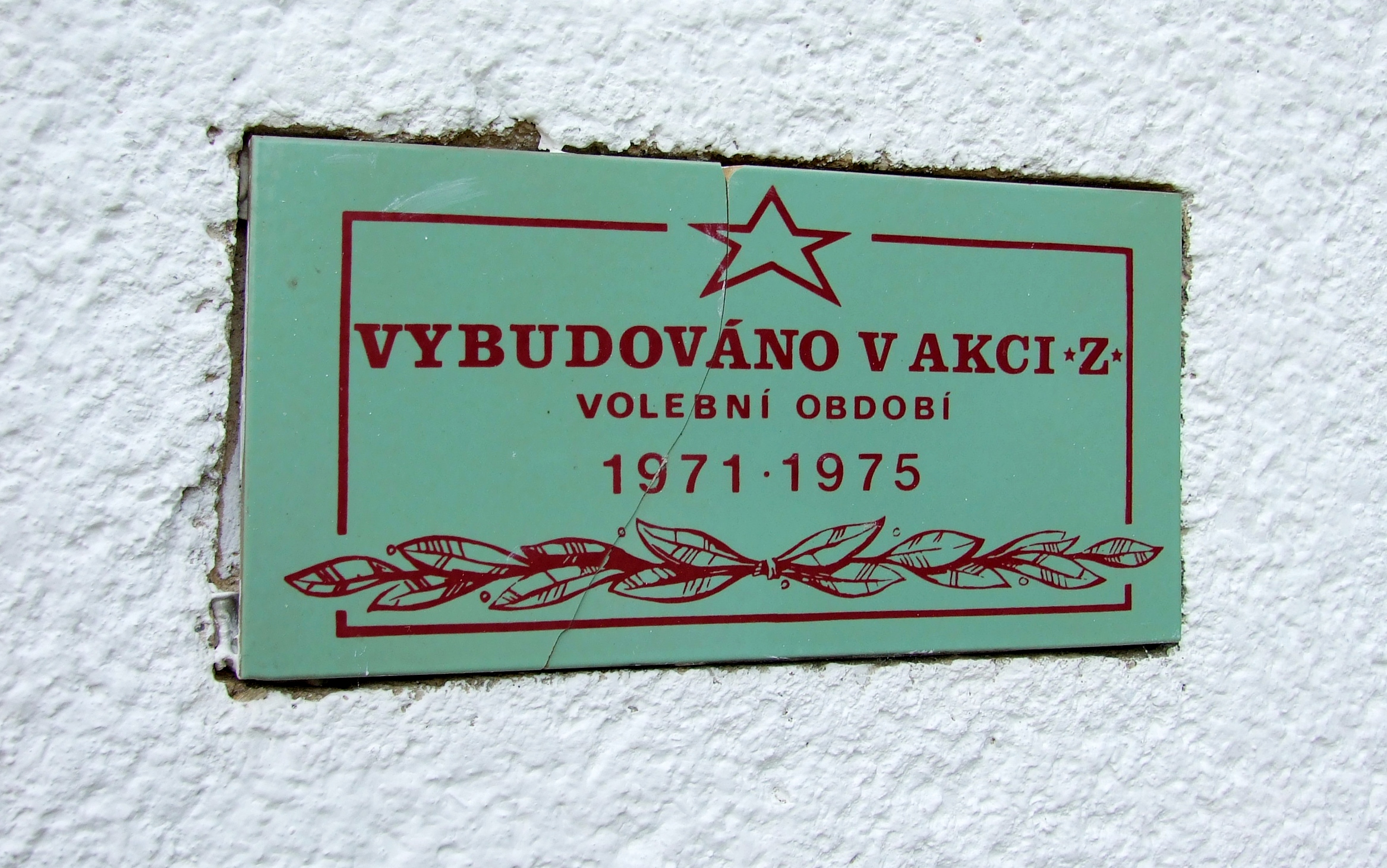
A plaque that says that the building was constructed in course of Akce Z

Initiative Z (Czech: Akce Z) was an attempt by Communist Czechoslovakia to tap a volunteer work and community spirit toward supplementing local infrastructure and public facility improvement using volunteer work while the construction material and the logistics were provided by the government. It was a nationwide program of a volunteer, community-improvement unpaid manual labor by the population, which was officially recognized as volunteer work. It ran for several decades, mainly on the projects where the 5-year planned economy had encountered substantial delays.

Specific local plans with Initiative Z community improvement projects were usually announced by a local Národní výbor ("People's Committee", i.e. an elected city council-like local government administrative body). Larger projects undertaken within Initiative Z eventually found their place in the nationwide state plans of economic development, such as Five-Year Plans.

The work was done outside regular working hours, very often on Saturday morning, and was similar to subbotniks in the Soviet Union or standard community action or community improvement initiatives and programs in the West.

Although it was meant to be entirely voluntary work, the names of volunteers and the number of hours they worked were duly documented. Participation in the Akce Z program was de facto a kind of civil conscription, because those citizens who did not participate - and therefore their names did not appear on the lists - were questioned, and in many cases found themselves subtly threatened with possible disadvantages such as reduced choices regarding future education or difficulty in change of employer.

Those citizens who worked the most hours were publicly recognized and there was an award system in which those who contributed more than 50 hours in a given year were awarded a silver Akce Z pin and those with more than 100 hours received a gold Akce Z pin. Over the years, many people, especially young people, earned several of these pins and mentioned this fact when applying for university admission.

"Z" stands for the Czech word zvelebování, "improvement", referring to improvement of public places. Typical activities ranged from garbage removal and planting trees to construction of some public-service facilities, such as children's playgrounds, cultural centers (Kulturní domy, Houses of Culture), municipal pipelines or sewage lines, numerous grocery stores in small villages (for example grocery store Smíšené Zboží in village (Hůrky coordinates 49.049331 N, 15.133108 E) near Nová Bystřice) etc.

In the late 1980s when the planned economy was in the latest phase of its struggle, even technically advanced projects were attempted to be progressed by sending numbers of unskilled volunteers to help under the umbrella of Initiative Z. However, the lack of skills among volunteers was often counter-productive, and faulty results of volunteer work, although well-hidden, regularly led to even longer delays. Many participants recalled being ordered to perform "busy work", such as having to move a large pile of sand from one spot to another 20 meters away with shovels and wheelbarrows, just to witness it being relocated by a machine to its original location the next day.

Czechs, ever skeptical, claimed that the "Z" stood for zdarma, i.e., "without pay".

== See also ==
- Working Saturday
