= Subbotnik =

Days of organized volunteering in the Soviet Union and modern Russia

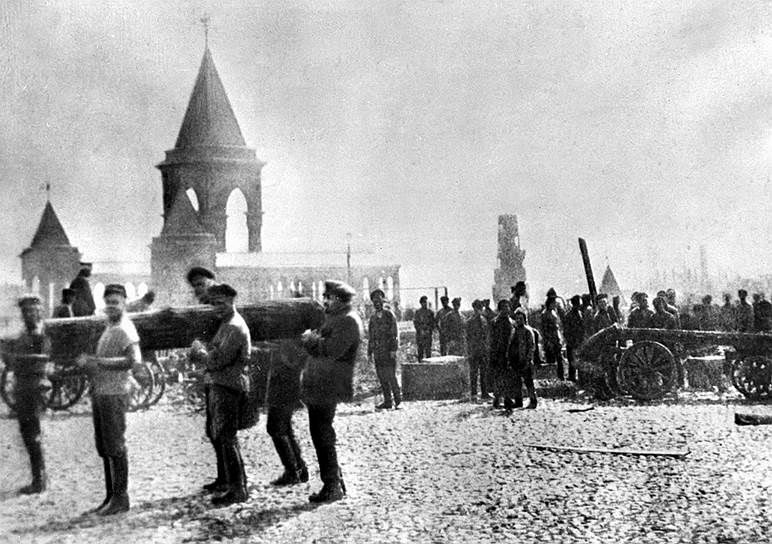
Vladimir Lenin at the All-Russia Subbotnik in the Kremlin grounds, Moscow, May 1, 1920

Subbotnik and voskresnik (from Russian: суббо́та, IPA: [sʊˈbotə] 'Saturday' and воскресе́нье, IPA: [vəskrʲɪˈsʲenʲjɪ] 'Sunday') were days of volunteer unpaid work on weekends after the October Revolution, though the word itself is derived from суббо́та (subbota for Saturday) and the common Russian suffix -ник (-nik). The tradition is continued in modern Russia and some other former Soviet Republics. Subbotniks are mostly organized for cleaning the streets of garbage, fixing public amenities, collecting recyclable material, and other community services.

== Russia ==
The first mass subbotnik was held on April 12, 1919, at the Moscow-Sortirovochnaya railway depot of the Moscow-Kazan Railway upon the initiative of local Bolsheviks. It was stated in the Resolution of the General Council of Communists of the Subraion of the Moscow-Kazan Railway and Their Adherents that "the communists and their supporters again must spur themselves on and extract from their time off still another hour of work, i.e. they must increase their working day by an hour, add it up and on Saturday devote six hours at a stretch to physical labour, thereby producing immediately a real value. Considering that communists should not spare their health and lives for the victory of the revolution, the work is conducted without pay." This subbotnik prompted Lenin to write the article The Grand Initiative, where he called subbotniks "the actual beginnings of the communism".

On April 12, 1969, to celebrate the 50th anniversary of the first Subbotnik, the Soviet Union revived the concept and millions of citizens volunteered for extra work at least as late as 1971.

The first all-Russian subbotnik was held on May 1, 1920, and Vladimir Lenin participated in removing building rubble in the Moscow Kremlin, an episode portrayed in a famous painting by Vladimir Krikhatsky, Lenin at the First Subbotnik, of Lenin carrying a log.

Subsequently, "communist subbotniks" and "voskresniks" became obligatory political events in the Soviet Union, with annual "Lenin's Subbotnik" being held in the vicinity of Lenin's birthday.

The first edition of the Great Soviet Encyclopedia (1946) defined communist subbotniks as "a communist form of voluntary and unpaid labor by workers for the socialist state," and, following Lenin's assessment, presented them as a de facto beginning of communism. According to the encyclopedia, subbotniks gave rise to socialist competition, which during Stalin's Five-Year Plans developed into a mass movement that found further expression in the Stakhanovite movement.

== Poland ==
In the Polish People's Republic, this kind of work was known as czyn społeczny ("social deed" or "social act") and was promoted by workplaces, schools, party and youth organisations. In Warsaw, which was almost completely destroyed during World War II, czyny społeczne began as efforts to clear away rubble one and the first ones were organised as early as January 1945. During the years 1945−1973, 9.3 million Poles took part in these initiatives in the capital alone, working for a total of 32.8 million hours. As a result of these Varsovian works, many new roads, parks, squares, playgrounds, and sports fields were created.

== Other countries ==
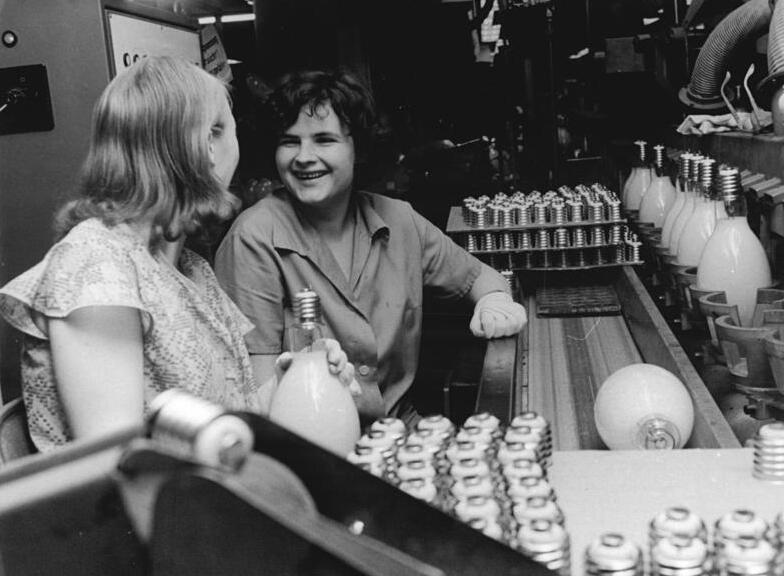
Youth brigade at a lightbulb factory, GDR

Subbotnik was also promoted in the 1950s in the Eastern Bloc countries and in particular in the German Democratic Republic (GDR).

In Czechoslovakia, a similar kind of work was known as Action Z (Akce Z), from Czech word zvelebování, "improvement", referring to the typical activities from garbage removal to housing construction.

== See also ==
- Civil conscription
- Sabato fascista
- Working Saturday

== Bibliography ==
- Kaplan, Frederick (1968). Bolshevik Ideology and the Ethics of Soviet labor. Philosophical library, New York.
