= NKVD labor columns =

In the Soviet Union of World War II, NKVD labor columns (Russian: рабочие колонны НКВД, romanized: rabochiye kolonny NKVD) were militarized labor formations created from certain categories of population, both fully rightful Soviet citizens, as well as categories of limited civil rights. They were primarily from the people of ethnicities associated with the countries that fought against the Soviet Union. The vast majority of them were ethnic Germans. In later literature these formations were informally referred to as "labor army", in an analogy with Soviet Labor armies of 1920–1921, although this term was not used in official Soviet documents in reference to 1941–1946.

Although persons of these categories were not permitted to serve in the Soviet Army, members of the labor columns were considered to be conscripted for military duty.

== Soviet Germans ==
A notable category of "labor armyists" (Russian: "трудармейцы", German: Trudarmisten) were Soviet Germans. This started in 1941, when the NKVD (via Prikaz 35105) banned ethnic Germans from the Soviet military. Tens of thousands of these soldiers were sent to the Labor Army.

During 1942, eventually all male Germans of ages from 16 to 50 years and all female Germans of ages 16–45 without children younger than 3 years were conscripted to labor duty. Most of them worked at "NKVD objects" (i.e., basically in the same conditions as in Gulag prison camps; the Germans were supposed to be housed in separate camps, but this was not always done), and in coal mining and petroleum industries, railroad construction, ammunition, general construction, and other industries. Many lost their lives in the labor army.

The German labor columns were dismissed in 1945, but Germans were held for much longer. In 1948 they were transferred to the status of "special settlers" and were not allowed to return home. In 1955, after the official visit of Chancellor of Germany Adenauer to the Soviet Union and the signing of a number of Soviet-German agreements, this status was abolished (the process of resettlement of Germans to Germany was started at this time as well). Still, the Germans that were deported initially from European and border regions (in particular, Volga Germans) were not allowed to return.

== See also ==
- Construction battalion (Soviet Union)
- Population transfer in the Soviet Union
- Reichsarbeitsdienst
- Unfree labour
