= Labor army =

Labor concept in the Soviet Union

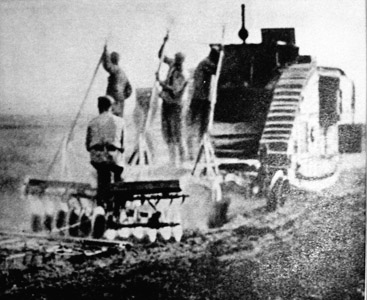
Labor army in 1920, Mark V.

The notion of the Labor army (трудовая армия, трудармия) was introduced in Soviet Russia during the Russian Civil War in 1920. Initially the term was applied to regiments of Red Army transferred from military activity to labor activity, such as logging, coal mining, firewood stocking, etc.

== History ==
The first labor army (1я Трудармия, 1-я армия труда) was created after the defeat of Kolchak on the base of the 3rd Army located in the Urals region by the initiative of the army commander Mikhail Matiyasevich (командарм Михаил Степанович Матиясевич).

Leon Trotsky, acting as People's Commissar of Army and Fleet Affairs and Chairman of the Revolutionary Military Council of the Republic at this time, developed this idea further. He argued that the economic situation in the country required introduction of the universal labor duty. In the case of workers, this could be done with the help of trade unions, while in the case of peasantry, Trotsky argued, it was possible only through mobilization.

He argued further that "army-type organization is in fact inherently Soviet type of organization".

His critics argued that this idea was leading back to the times of tsarism and slavery. Trotsky retorted that unlike old times, workers were supposed to work not for exploiters, but for their own good, for their own state, i.e., labor duty is the fulfillment of the obligations of the liberated working class with respect to their "worker-peasant state" in the cases of emergency.

By the end of the Russian Civil War and the introduction of New Economic Policy the idea of the labor army ended, especially after Joseph Stalin's assumption of power and the implementation of his policies of industrialization and collectivization, which effectively solved the problem of workforce mobilization both in industry and agriculture.

Later Trotskyists such as Isaac Deutscher and Tony Cliff have been critics of this policy but Ernest Mandel asserted that a myth had been constructed around the role of Trotsky in the trade-union debate. Mandel argued this controversy had been used by liberal circles in Russia to claim that Trotsky’s proposals on the “militarization of labour” had provided the groundwork for more repressive and authoritarian policies which were later adopted by Stalin against workers. Mandel believed this view overlooked historical ascertainable facts such as the extensive unemployment, lumpenization of workers and the fact there were no examples of repressive actions taken against workers in factories during the period of labour armies. Mandel further re-iterated that Trotsky's attitudes was driven by his concern about the need to prepare workers for key positions in factory management and he had proposed replacing war communism with the NEP a year ahead of the party leadership.

== Later Soviet Union ==
During World War II certain categories of population, primarily ethnic Germans, were conscripted into NKVD labor columns, in later literature informally referred to as "labor army".

Until the last days of the Soviet Union, the Soviet Army incorporated the idea of the labor army. With obligatory military duty in the state, men deemed unfit for regular military duty but not unfit for other work, as well as many able-bodied ones, were assigned to construction battalions (стройбаты). This tradition continues in a number of post-Soviet states, notably Russia, Belarus and Turkmenistan.

== See also ==
- Alternative civilian service
- Bevin Boys
- Civil conscription
- Civilian Conservation Corps
- Construction soldier
- Hand and hitch-up services
- Labor battalion
- Reserve Army of Labour
- Reichsarbeitsdienst
- Workfare
- Unfree labour
