= Working Saturday =

Saturdays on which work is done

In some countries which have a five-day workweek with Saturday and Sunday being days off, on some occasions some Saturdays may be declared working Saturdays.

== Transferred working day ==
In the Soviet Union, modern Russia, and Hungary, the Friday following a public holiday that falls on Thursday and the Monday before one that falls on Tuesday are transferred to Saturdays to make longer runs of consecutive nonworking days. In this case the "bridge" Monday or Friday is treated as a Saturday in terms of time tables and working hours and the related "working Saturday" is treated as a normal work day. Over the two work weeks concerned, work is done on nine days with one work week running for six days and the other one for three. Employees always have the option of taking a day from their personal vacation allowance and using it to avoid working on the "working Saturday". Some employers and many education institutions treat the working Saturday as a regular one (giving a "free" day off in the former case).

For example in 2007 Russia held working Sundays on 28 April, 9 June, and 29 December in lieu of 30 April, 11 June, and 31 December, respectively.

== Romania ==
In Romania, there was a six-day workweek until 1990. Initially there were an average of 48 working hours a week, but in 1982 and 1985 the communist government formally reduced the working hours to 46, and subsequently 45. In some areas a reduced workweek (săptămână redusă de lucru) was permitted, involving 1-2 extra work hours from Monday to Friday in exchange for a free Saturday, but this was only about flexibility of working program, not a real process of switching to a 5-day workweek.

The process of transition to 5-day workweek started on 19 March 1990 with 2 free days a month, usually Saturdays. The same law stated that the term for finalizing the transition is the end of 3rd trimester (i.e. 30 September 1990).

== See also ==
- Subbotnik
