= Main Administration for Affairs of Prisoners of War and Internees =

Government agency in the Soviet Union from 1939 to 1953

The Main Administration for Affairs of Prisoners of War and Internees (Note: Numerous translations of the name of the department have appeared in English sources including "Chief Administration for POW and Internee Affairs", "Main Directorate for POW and Internee Affairs", "Main Administration for the Affairs of Prisoners of War and Internees", and "Main Administration of Prisoners of War and Interned Personnel".) (Russian: Главное управление по делам военнопленных и интернированных НКВД/МВД СССР, ГУПВИ, romanized: GUPVI, GUPVI NKVD SSSR/ MVD SSSR) was an NKVD (later MVD) department in charge of handling of foreign civilian internees and prisoners of war (POWs) in the Soviet Union during and in the aftermath of World War II (1939–1953).

GUPVI was established as a part of the NKVD under the name "Administration for Affairs of Prisoners of War and Internees (UPVI) in September 1939, after the Soviet invasion of Poland. The qualifier "main" was added in January 1945.

The legal foundation for its creation was the Sovnarkom Decree of July 1, 1941 "Regulations on Prisoners of War" ("Положение о военнопленных"), updated by the September 29, 1945 "Regulations on Use of Labor of Prisoners of War" (Положение о трудовом использовании военнопленных).

In many ways, the GUPVI system was similar to GULAG. Its major function was the organization of foreign forced labor in the Soviet Union. Top GUPVI leadership came from the GULAG system. Conditions in the two camp systems were similar: hard labor, poor nutrition and living conditions, high mortality rates.

One major difference with the GULAG system was the absence of convicted criminals in GUPVI camps. Another was that GUPVI camps provided a major source of recruitment of future communist activists for communist states such as the German Democratic Republic and the Polish People's Republic, as well as for various "democratic committees" made up of nationals such as Japanese and Austrians. Significant efforts were made to "ideologically reforge" (идеологическая перековка) prisoners, and numerous clubs, libraries and local radio stations were created.

During the GUPVI's fourteen-year existence, it administered over 500 POW camps in the Soviet Union and abroad, housing over four million prisoners.

== Chiefs ==
- 1939-1943: Pyotr Soprunenko, major of state security
- 1943-1945: Ivan Petrov, lieutenant general
- 1945-1947: Mikhail Krivenko (Krivenko Mikhail Spiridonovich, 1904–1954)
- 1947-1949: Taras Filippov, lieutenant general
- 1949-1950: I.A. Petrov, lieutenant general (deputy chief, until his discharge for health reasons on November 21, 1950)
- 1950-1953: Amayak Kobulov, lieutenant general (1950-1951: NKVD GUPVI, 1951-1953: MVD UPVI)

== See also ==
- List of POW camps in the Soviet Union
- Katyn massacre
