= Deubner =

Deubner is a surname. Notable people with the surname include:

- Alexander Deubner (1899– 1946), Catholic priest after Orthodox one and again priest of the Russian Catholic Church of the Byzantine Rite
- Brett Deubner (born 1968), American violist
- Ivan Deubner (1873–1936), Russian Catholic priest who converted to the Russian Catholic Church of Byzantine rite
- Otfried Deubner (1908–2001), German classical archaeologist and diplomat
