= Aleksei Zerchaninov =

Russian Greek-Catholic priest (1848–1933)

Aleksei Zerchaninov Алексей Зерчанинов
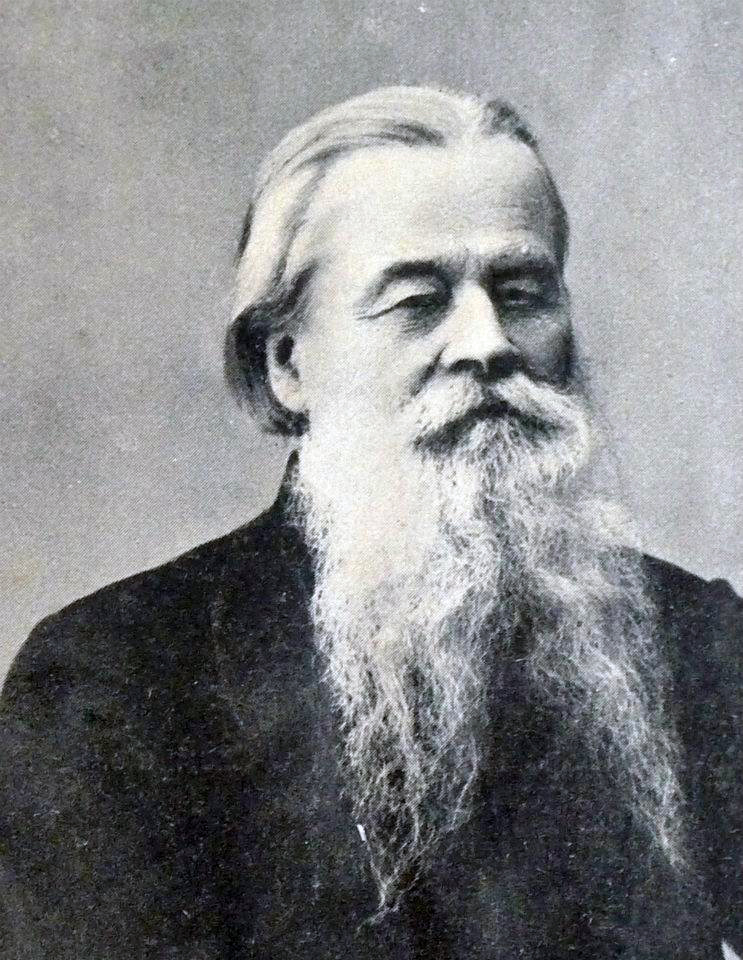

Personal details
- Born: 9 March 1848 Bolshoye Murashkino, Nizhny Novgorod Governorate, Russian Empire
- Died: 23 September 1933 (aged 85) Gorky, Russian SFSR, Soviet Union
- Denomination: Russian Catholic

Archpriest Aleksei Evgrafovich Zerchaninov (Russian: Алексей Евграфович Зерчанинов; 9 March 1848 – 23 September 1933) was a Russian Greek-Catholic priest.

== Biography ==
Zerchaninov was born on 9 March 1848 in the village of Bolshoye Murashkino (now Nizhny Novgorod Oblast) to the family of an Eastern Orthodox Church priest. In June 1871 Aleksei graduated from Nizhny Novgorod Theological Seminary with a right to enter the Theological Academy. Deliberately not used this right, that they might become a priest and to pastoral work, which felt a calling. On 10 September 1871, he married and on 15 October took ordination to the priesthood. He served as rector in his native village, then became dean of Arzamas and served lawyers in several educational institutions. He was engaged in missionary work of the Synodal Church of the Old Believers, which scrutinize the Church Fathers and ecclesiastical history. More thorough study of patristics led him to the conviction of the truth of the Catholic faith. On 9 January 1896, he was admitted to existing rank in the Catholic Church. Zerchaninov was arrested 3 July 1898 and placed in Suzdal jail for religious criminals. Released at the request of Natalia Ushakova on 21 February 1901, he worked without a break on a farm, which he bought in the Nizhny Novgorod region shortly before his arrest. He was joined by the eldest son Julius, as a priest and abbot, after Father Aleksei Zerchaninov's union to the Catholic Church. At his farm he began to write books. His first work, The Kingdom of God in the world" he wrote during his imprisonment. Another popular essay was " Nepokladnye People" published in 1904 in Kraków under the pseudonym A.N. Zvezdina. According to the author, it almost photographically depicts the life of the Russian Orthodox clergy and what it offers to the secular power. The manuscript of the book was taken out of Russia by Polish Jesuit Father Henry Podynkovskim.

Following the publication of the Manifesto of Toleration he was able to settle in Saint Petersburg. In 1905, Zerchaninov became, along with Ivan Deubner and Eustachios Susalev, a priest of his native church united with Rome celebrating Mass in Saint Petersburg. In the spring of 1907 in Rome, he was received by Pope Pius X. He was deeply moved and impressed by the kindness and good humor with which he was received by the successor of Peter, so unlike the familiar attitude of the Russian Orthodox bishops to the clergy. In Rome, he also met with the future Exarch Leonid Feodorov, then traveled to Lourdes and Lviv. On 29 June 1907, Zerchaninov was placed over the Kamenetsekoy diocese by Metropolitan Andrey Sheptytsky. In November 1907, he returned to Saint Petersburg where he created the Russian Greek-Catholic community. On 21 May 1908, he was appointed head of mission for the Russian Catholics of the Eastern rite. After 1912 he was the vicar of the church of Saint Catherine in Saint Petersburg. After the establishment of the Exarchate of Russian Greek Catholic Church in Russia, Father Aleksei became the secretary of the Exarch of Russian Catholics, Father Leonid Feodorov from 1917 to 1920. In 1917 he took part in the Council of the Greek Catholic clergy. On 1 May 1919, he was arrested together with Metropolitan Ropp, and released a month later. He was arrested 12 April 1920, but released after 4 days. In February 1920, he was awarded an honorary prelature.

After March 1923 he headed the northern part of the Russian Greek Catholic Church Exarchate. He was arrested 19 November 1923, and in December released after signing not to leave. On 19 May 1924, Zerchaninov was sentenced to 10 years in prison, but because of advanced age this was commuted to three years in exile, initially at Yekaterinburg and then at Tobolsk. On 28 May 1926, he was arrested in Tobolsk and sent to Obdorsk. On 9 May 1927, he was released but forbidden to stay in six major cities of the USSR. He lived in Smolensk and in 1929 he moved to Nizhny Novgorod, where he died on 23 September 1933.

== Sources ==
- http://www.beutel.narod.ru/write/convert.htm
- https://web.archive.org/web/20091226165817/http://vselenstvo.narod.ru/library/histdest.htm
- http://rumkatkilise.org/necplus.htm
- https://web.archive.org/web/20121122031721/http://www.rkcvo.ru/
- http://www.byzcath.ru/
- http://www.griekukatoli.narod.ru/index.html
- http://vselenskiy.narod.ru/
- http://www.hierarchy.religare.ru/h-uniate-rgkc.html
- http://www.cerkva.od.ua/
