= Kamenica (Čelinac) =

Kamenica Каменица
- Village
- Location within Bosnia and Herzegovina
- Coordinates: 44°46′13″N 17°26′56″E
- Country: Bosnia and Herzegovina
- Entity: Republika Srpska
- Municipality: Čelinac
- Time zone: UTC+1 (CET)
  - Summer (DST): UTC+2 (CEST)

Kamenica (Cyrillic: Каменица) is a village in the municipality of Čelinac, Republika Srpska, Bosnia and Herzegovina.

== Former Ukrainian monastery and farming community ==
During the early 20th century, the Government of the Austro-Hungarian Empire settled a community of Rusyns and Ukrainians, all of whom belonged to the Eastern Catholic Churches, in Kamenica. Beginning in 1908, Metropolitan bishop Andrey Sheptytsky of the Ukrainian Greek Catholic Church bought land nearby upon which he built a small monastery for the Ukrainian Studite Monks, which was dedicated to St. Joseph, the Spouse of the Mother of God and Foster Father of Jesus Christ. The spiritual formation of new arrivals was supervised by a Greek Catholic Starets named "Elder Josaphat. The monks included Leonid Feodorov, the future Exarch of the Russian Greek Catholic Church, who was tonsured at Kamenica under the monastic name 'Leontiy' on 12 March 1913. The Metropolitan's younger brother and fellow Studite monk Klymentiy Sheptytsky, was also a monk at Kamenica and, along with Leonid Feodorov, was Beatified by Pope John Paul II in Lviv on 27 June 2001. Even though the monastery was always extremely impoverished, the Studite monks were eventually forced to flee the region due to the hostility of local members of the Serbian Orthodox Church. Even though Metropolitan Andrey still owned the land, his attempts to revive the monastery between 1923 and 1924 were repeatedly stymied by the post-World War I Government of the Kingdom of Yugoslavia.
