= Alexander Deubner =

Russian priest (1899–1946)

- Church: Russian Catholic Church
- Quashed: 1932

Orders
- Ordination: 1926 by Bishop Michael Mirov

Personal details
- Born: 15 August 1899 Ilensko-Tobolsk, Tobolsk, Russian Empire
- Died: 15 May 1946 (aged 46) Moscow, Soviet Union
- Parents: Ivan Deubner

Alexander Ivanovich Deubner (15 August 1899 – 15 May 1946) was a Christian priest in Russia. He was originally a Catholic priest of the Russian Catholic Church, then a priest of the Byzantine Rite before returning to the Catholic church. He was also a member of the Russian diaspora and died in the Gulag.

== Biography ==
Deubner was born in Ilensko-Tobolsk village, Tobolsk Governorate, Russian Empire, into a family of Catholic priests of the Byzantine rite, Ivan Deubner, his father having converted to Catholicism in 1903.

In 1913 Alexander lived in Saint Petersburg, and then he was brought up in a Catholic Assumptionists Order, first in Constantinople, then in Belgium, and later he took his monastic vows in the Order with the name Spyridon. Ordained a priest in Constantinople in 1926 by Bishop Michael Mirov, Exarch of the Bulgarian Greek Catholic Church he was sent to work with Russian immigrants in the south of France, under the leadership of the priest Lev Gillet, OSB, serving in the House for Russian children in Nice.

In 1928 Alexander Deubner and Gillet abandoned Catholicism and joined Orthodoxy under the jurisdiction of the Orthodox Metropolitan Eulogius (Georgievsky) of the Western European Exarchate of Russian Orthodox parishes, but shortly after, at the request of his (Catholic) father suffering exile within Russia, Alexander returned to Catholicism, working in the Commission "Pro Russia" and being secretary of Bishop Michel d'Herbigny.

In 1932 he left the ministry for 'not very honourable' reasons and went to Berlin where he was denounced as a Soviet spy, but in 1933 he returned to Rome, and shortly went to Paris. From 1935 he was living in Prague and in 1943 he was arrested by the Nazi regime and taken to Berlin, where he worked as a translator at the beginning of 1945, returning to Prague on 12 July 1945 where he was arrested and taken to the Soviet Union. He was held in Butyrka prison in Moscow and was sentenced to 10 years but he died in the Gulag on 5 May 1946.

== Family ==
Alexander's sister Nadezhda became a Catholic nun in the Assumptionists Order.

Deubner was the nephew of Clara Zetkin of the Communist Party of Germany.
