= Fabijan Abrantovich =

Belarusian Roman Catholic priest and independence activist

Fabijan Abrantovich 龐懷德
- Exarch and Apostolic Administrator for Catholics of the Eastern Rite in Manchuria
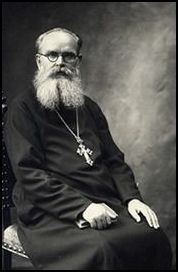
- Native name: Фабія́н Я́навіч Абранто́віч
- Church: Catholic Church
- Archdiocese: Russian Catholic Apostolic Exarchate of Harbin
- See: Harbin
- Appointed: 20 May 1928
- Term ended: 1939
- Predecessor: Exarchate erected
- Successor: Vendelín Javorka

Orders
- Ordination: November 9, 1908

Personal details
- Born: September 14, 1884 Vieraskava, Novogrudsky Uyezd, Minsk Governorate, Russian Empire (now Navahrudak District, Belarus)
- Died: January 2, 1946 (aged 61) Butyrka prison, Soviet Union
- Denomination: Catholic

Sainthood
- Title as Saint: Servant of God

Fabian Ivanovich Abrantovich (Fabijan Abrantovič; Chinese: 龐懷德, Belarusian: Фабія́н Я́навіч Абранто́віч, Russian: Фабиа́н Ива́нович Абранто́вич, Polish: Fabian Abrantowicz; September 14, 1884 – January 2, 1946) was a prominent religious and civic leader from Belarus. Abrantovich was a significant figure in the struggle for the recognition of the Belarusian language by the Roman Catholic Church, the revival of Catholicism within Belarusian culture, and to the further revival of Belarusian nationalism.

== Biography ==
Abrantovich was born in Vieraskava, in the Novogrudsky Uyezd of Minsk Governorate (present-day Navahrudak District, Belarus). He first studied there and then in Saint Petersburg at the Roman Catholic seminary and the Imperial Theological academy. He graduated with the degree of Master of Theology and was ordained to the priesthood on November 9, 1908. As one of the best students at the academy, Abrantovich received scholarship for study at the Catholic University of Leuven, Belgium, where he received Ph.D. in 1912.

Before World War I, Abrantovich was a faculty member at the Catholic Ecclesiastical Academy in St. Petersburg. There he became very active in the Belarusian movement. He organized several groups of students and initiated numerous Belarusian language publications. Abrantovich was the founder of the Belarusian Christian Movement and was the head of the first Belarusian Christian Union (Chryścijanskaja Demakratyčnaja Złučnaść) which was established in Petrograd (ex St. Petersburg) in May 1917. He was one of the Belarusian Roman Catholic priests who initiated the organization of the Belarusian political conference in Minsk in March 1917 and the conference of the Belarusian Roman Catholic Clergy, May 24–25, 1917.

When a Roman Catholic Seminary finally opened in Minsk during the fall of 1918, Abrantovich was appointed rector of this institution. His time was divided between pastoral obligations, teaching, and Belarusian activities in Minsk. Father Abrantovich was convinced that the Catholic Church in Belarus should embrace Belarusian culture and the language revival rather than continue to be a tool of colonialism and Polonization.

After the partition of Belarus between the Second Polish Republic and the Soviet Union in 1921, Abrantovich moved to Polish-ruled West Belarus: first to the city of Pinsk, and in 1926 to the town of Druja where the Congregation of Marian Fathers had opened a Gymnasium and also settled in 1923. However, his political activities did not stop there: he vigorously protested the Concordat between the Holy See and the Polish government and supported numerous Belarusian cultural and political programs. At the request of the Polish-speaking Hierarchy of the Catholic Church in Belarus, Abrantovich was removed from Druja and reassigned to missionary work among anti-communist Russian political refugees in Manchuria. Abrantovich transferred to the Byzantine Rite and was promoted to Apostolic Exarch of Harbin for the Russian Greek Catholic Church.

In 1939 he was in Rome to elect a new Superior, and decided afterwards to visit his colleagues in Poland (Belarus and Galicia), but in September the Red Army invaded the East part of Poland, and the Wehrmacht invaded the West part. Father Abrantovich was arrested by the NKVD in October during an attempt to flee toward German-occupied Poland. He was imprisoned in Lwow, and tortured. Later on he was transferred to the Butyrka prison in Moscow.

== Death and legacy ==
The place and the date of his death are not established with 100% certainty, although it is thought that he died from torture in the Butyrka prison on January 2, 1946.

In 2003, the Causes for Beatification of six Soviet-era martyrs and confessors of the Russian Greek Catholic Church: Fabijan Abrantovich, Anna Abrikosova, Igor Akulov, Potapy Emelianov, Halina Jętkiewicz, and Andrzej Cikoto, were submitted to the Holy See's Congregation for the Causes of Saints by the Bishops of the Catholic Church in Russia. His current title is Servant of God.

== See also ==
- West Belarus
- Vladimir Kolupaev. Belarusian missionaries in China // Entries 37. New York - Miensk: Belarusian Institute of Science and Art, 2014. p. 645 - 650.
