= Abraham Resnick =

American rabbi, writer, and publisher

Abraham Resnick (June 26, 1867–May 5, 1942, Rochester, New York) was an American rabbi, writer, and publisher.

Resnick studied under Rabbi Abraham Zadok Bagin in Druya, Russian Empire. He served as rabbi in Ashkhabad (on the Caspian Sea), Kokand in Turkestan, and Moscow.

In 1924, Resnick emigrated to the United States. He served as rabbi in Quincy, Massachusetts, Lowell, Massachusetts, and Rochester, New York. Resnick contributed to many European Hebrew periodicals, and published a book of his own articles.

== Sources ==
- Goldman, Yosef. Hebrew Printing in America, 1735-1926, A History and Annotated Bibliography (YGBooks 2006). ISBN 1-59975-685-4.
- American Jewish Archives
