= Russian Catholic Apostolic Exarchate of Russia =

Eastern Catholic ecclesiastical jurisdiction in Russia

Apostolic Exarchate of Russia Exarchatus Apostolicus Russiae Апостольский экзархат России

Location
- Country: Russia

Information
- Denomination: Catholic Church
- Sui iuris church: Russian Greek Catholic
- Rite: Byzantine Rite
- Established: 1917
- Language: Church Slavonic, Russian

Current leadership
- Pope: Leo XIV
- Exarch: Sede vacante

The Russian Catholic Apostolic Exarchate of Russia is the sui iuris ("autonomous") Eastern Catholic jurisdiction of the Catholic Church for the Byzantine Rite in Russia. It is one of only two components of the Russian Greek Catholic Church, which has no proper diocese, its only sister being the Russian Apostolic Exarchate of Harbin in China, which also has been vacant for decades.

== History ==
It was established in 1917 as an Apostolic exarchate, this being the Eastern Catholic pre-diocesan equivalent of an Apostolic vicariate; hence it was directly subject to the Apostolic See and its Congregation for the Eastern Churches and not part of any ecclesiastical province. It was established in territory that previously exclusively belonged to the Latin Metropolitan Roman Catholic Archdiocese of Mohilev. In June (O.S. May) 1917, the first synod of the Russian Greek Catholic Church was held, where Leonid Feodorov was chosen as exarch and a number of measures to establish the church were accepted. The exarchate of Russia was officially recognized by Pope Benedict XV in 1921, and before that it had been subordinated to Ukrainian Metropolitan Andrey Sheptytsky.

After the arrest and exile of Leonid Feodorov by the Soviets in the late 1920s, the exarchate was placed under the Latin Catholic Apostolic Administration of Moscow, led by Bishop Pie Eugène Neveu, SJ. Neveu received Russian Orthodox into the Catholic Church in secret over the following years, before he left the country in 1936. Among those was the Orthodox bishop Bartholomew Remov, who was appointed by Neveu as bishop for the Russian Byzantine Catholic exarchate.

In 1942 the borders of the exarchate were defined as including "ethnic Great Russia, Finland, and Siberia."

== Ordinaries ==
It has been vacant since 1951, having had only two incumbents, both of which belonged to the Ukrainian Studite Monks (MSU), a Byzantine Rite monastic order of the Ukrainian Greek Catholic Church:

- Blessed Leontiy Leonid Feodorov, M.S.U. (1917.05.28 – 1935.03.07)
- Blessed Klymentiy Sheptytsky, M.S.U. (1939.09.17 – 1951.05.01); also first Hegumen of the Ukrainian Studite Monks (1919 – 1944.11), then Archimandrite of the Ukrainian Studite Monks (1944.11 – 1951.05.01)
  - Bishop Viktor Novikov, S.J., vice-exarch of Siberia (c. 1939 or 1940)

== See also ==
- List of Catholic dioceses in Russia
- Andrey Sheptytsky
