= Peter Artemiev =

Russian Orthodox Deacon

- Born: 1670s Suzdal, Russia
- Died: 30 March 1700; Solovetsky Monastery, Solovetsky Islands, Arkhangelsk Oblast

Peter Artemiev (Russian: Пётр Артемьев; d. March 30, 1700 Solovetsky Monastery, Russia) - was a Russian Orthodox Deacon, a convert to Byzantine Catholicism, and one of the first martyrs of the Russian Catholic Church.

== Biography ==
Born as the son of a Russian Orthodox priest, Peter Artemiev spent his childhood in Nizhny Novgorod, Vasilsursk and Suzdal. In years 1687-1688 he studied at the Slavic Greek Latin Academy in Moscow. In February 1688, as a "student and a novice" he travelled with Ioannikos Litkhoudis to the Republic of Venice. In Venice, Artemiev secretly adopted Catholicism. From Venice he travelled to Rome on pilgrimage and to see the Pope, and at the end of 1688 he returned to Moscow. Here Patriarch Adrian ordained him to the rank of deacon. While serving in the Peter and Paul Orthodox Church, Artemev became friendly with Moscow Jesuits Jerzy David and T. Tikhavski. After their expulsion ( 5 October 1689 ), confessed to the Jesuit missionary Fr. Conrad Terpilovsky, in Moscow on his way from Persia.

In 1698, Deacon Peter began to openly profess and preach reunion with the Holy See. According to a denunciation of the priest at St. Peter and Paul Church to Patriarch Adrian, he "harbors many who follow his heresies". Summoned from Suzdal, Peter's father could not persuade him to renounce Catholicism. Peter was sent to the Novospassky Monastery, where the wrote a letter to Patriarch, expressing willingness to accept martyrdom, denouncing the Patriarch and his Greek favorites, and defended the rights of the Old Believers. (The message has not been preserved, but we know the answer to it, entitled "Unmasking the Fallacies of Deacon Peter").

13 June 1698, according to the decision of Council with the participation of Patriarch Adrian, and other senior hierarchs of the Russian Orthodox Church, Artemiev was defrocked, anathematized and banished to a Vazhsky Monastery in Kholmogory diocese. Orders were given to keep him in strict isolation, do not give him ink and paper for writing and to not allow to attend the church. While imprisoned there between July 5 and 11 September 1698, Deacon Peter remained faithful to Catholic beliefs, continued to denounce the anti-Catholic elements of the Orthodox Church and preaching reunion with Rome. As a result, Bishop Athanasius of Kholmogory imprisoned him in Solovetsky Monastery, where Deacon Peter Artemiev died.
