= Viktor Novikov =

Russian Jesuit and Catholic bishop

Viktor Novikov SJ
- Bishop, Russian Catholic Vice Exarch of Siberia
- Church: Russian Greek Catholic Church

Orders
- Ordination: 1934
- Consecration: Before 1941

Personal details
- Born: 1905 Kazan, Kazan Governorate, Russian Empire
- Died: 14 May 1979 (aged 74) Belebey, Bashkir Autonomous SSR, Soviet Union

Viktor Pavlovich Novikov SJ (Russian: Виктор Павлович Новиков, 1905 – 14 May 1979) was a Russian Jesuit and Catholic bishop who was designated to serve as the vice-exarch of the Russian Greek Catholic Church in Siberia.

== Biography ==
Novikov was born in 1905 in Kazan, Russian Empire.

After the Russian Revolution, the Catholic Church established centers in eastern Poland for the purpose of bringing Russian emigres to Catholicism, and these were often run by "Russian rite" priests of the Society of Jesus. In 1934 Novikov was ordained as a Jesuit priest and was officially a member of the Lithuanian province of the Society of Jesus. As of 1939 he was working at a Catholic seminary in Dubno, Poland. Sometime before the German invasion of the Soviet Union in June 1941 Novikov had been consecrated as a bishop.

After the start of World War II he was sent as a Catholic missionary into the Soviet Union, though there is some uncertainty around the exact details. Novikov's own account states that he was made "Exarch of Siberia" by Andrey Sheptytsky, the Ukrainian Greek Catholic Archbishop of Lviv who had been given authority by the Holy See to look after the Russian Greek Catholic Church due to its difficult situation. Pavel Parfentyev wrote that this is inaccurate, and that Klymentiy Sheptytsky, who was appointed by Andrey Sheptytsky as Russian Catholic Apostolic Exarch of Great Russia and Siberia in 1939, had given Novikov the subordinate role of Vice-Exarch of Siberia.

At some point after arriving in the Soviet Union, Novikov was arrested by the government and sent to a prison camp. In 1950, while they were both in a Soviet camp, Novikov ordained Pavlo Vasylyk as a deacon. Otherwise, he did not have much opportunity to do his work as the vice-exarch of Siberia, though he wrote that relations among the Roman Catholic, Eastern Catholic, and Orthodox clergy in the camp were good. When he was released from the camp in 1954, Novikov was sent to Belebey in the Bashkir Autonomous Soviet Socialist Republic, where he became a Latin language teacher at a medical school.

He died in Belebey on 14 May 1979. His autobiography, which he wrote in Latin, is kept at the Collegium Russicum in Rome.

== Sources ==
- Simon, Constantin (1995). "How Russians See Us: Jesuit–Russian Relations Then and Now" (PDF). Religion, State, and Society. 23 (4): 343–357.
- Zugger, Christopher Lawrence (2001). The Forgotten: Catholics of the Soviet Empire from Lenin through Stalin. Syracuse, New York: Syracuse University Press. ISBN 0-8156-0679-6.
