= Alter Druyanov =

Russian Jewish author

- אלתר דרויאנוב
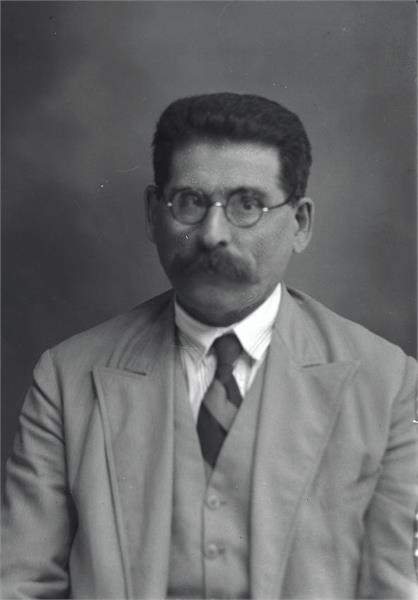
- Druyanov in 1938
- Born: July 6, 1870; Druya, Vilna Governorate, Russian Empire
- Died: May 10, 1938 (aged 67)
- Occupations: Writer, editor, translator, folklorist, journalist, historian
- Known for: History of early Zionism

Alter Druyanov (Hebrew: אלתר דרויאנוב) (July 6, 1870 – May 10, 1938) was a Russian Jewish writer, editor, translator, folklorist, journalist, historian of early Zionism, and Zionist activist. His pen name derived from his birthplace, Druya, was variously transliterated as Druyanow, Drujanow, etc.) He wrote both in Yiddish and Hebrew languages.

Alter Druyanov was born in Druya (in Vilna Governorate, Russian Empire, now in Belarus) to a wealthy family of a Chasidic rabbi and merchant Eliakim Pesach (Hetzel Yankelevich).

== Books ==
- Ketavim le-toledot Chibbat Zion we-Jischuv Erez Israel, vol. I Odessa 1918, vols. II, III, Tel Aviv 1925/1932, (annotated collection of documents of Hibbat Zion period of Hovevei Zion under Leon Pinsker
- Sefer ha-Bedicha ve-ha-Chidud (ספר הבדיחה והחידוד, The Book of Jokes and Wit), 1922 ( Works related to ספר הבדיחה והחידוד at Wikisource)
- פינסקר וזמנו ("Pinsker and His Time")
