= Žygimantų Street =

Street in Vilnius, Lithuania

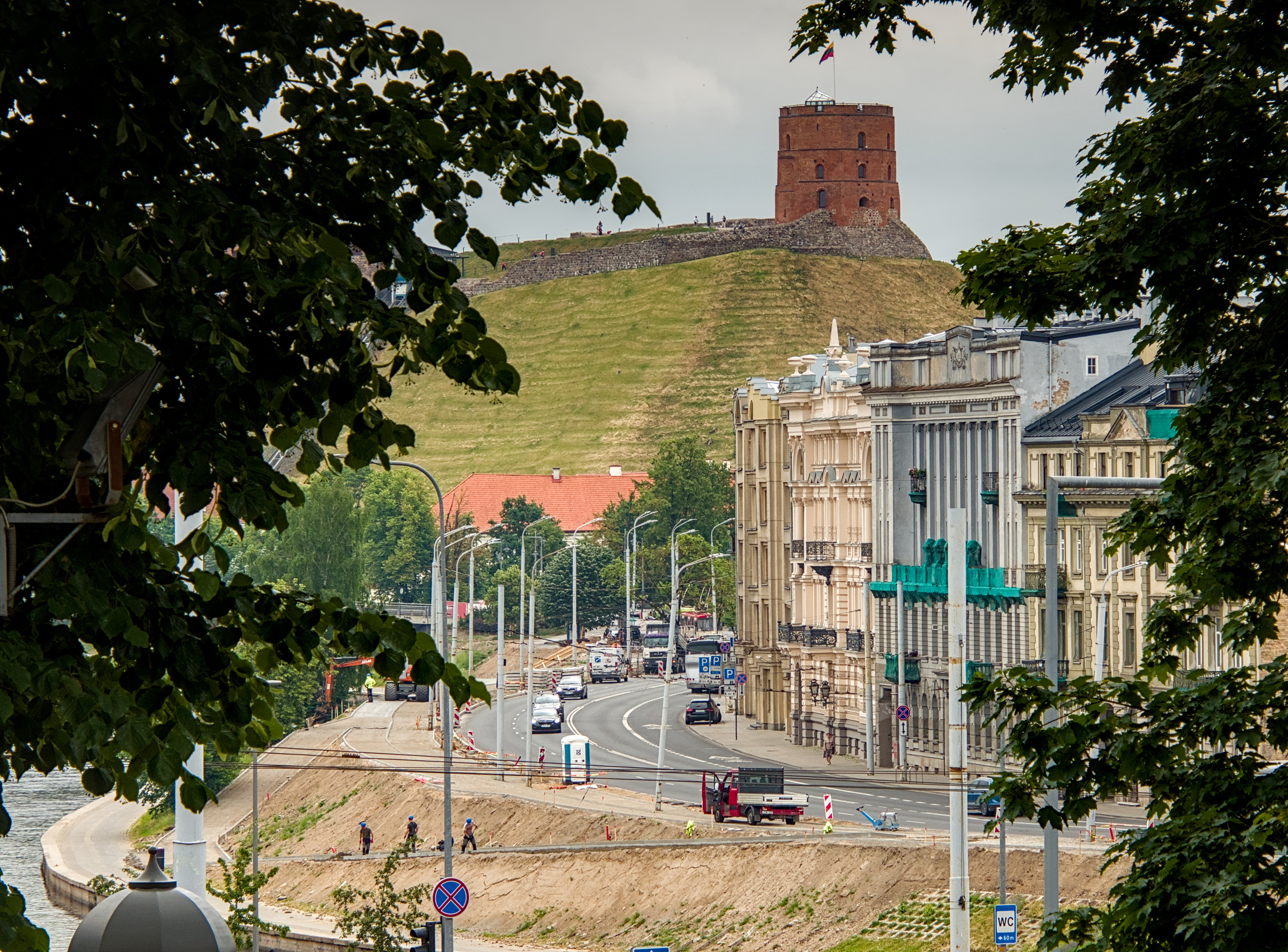
- Street maintenance works in 2024
- Native name: Žygimantų gatvė (Lithuanian)
- Length: 700 m (2,300 ft)
- Location: Vilnius, Lithuania
- Postal code: 01102
- Coordinates: 54°41′24.31313″N 25°17′3.93374″E

Žygimantų Street is a street in the Vilnius Old Town, Vilnius, Lithuania. It follows the left bank of the Neris River on the stretch between the Mindaugas Bridge separating it from the Arsenal street and the Green Bridge separating it from the Albertas Goštautas street.

== History ==
Before World War II, while in the interbellum Poland the street was named ulica Zygmuntowska (Sigismunds' Street) after the kings of Poland and Grand Dukes of Lithuania, Sigismund I the Old, Sigismund II Augustus, and Sigismund III Vasa. During the Soviet times it was part of the street named after Karolis Požela.

== Notable buildings ==
- Žygimantų 1: Wroblewski Library of the Lithuanian Academy of Sciences
- Žygimantų 2: Supreme Administrative Court of Lithuania
- Žygimantų 6: Lithuanian Children's Foundation; bears a memorial plaque "In this house, Professor Iosif Rebelsky founded an orphanage and school, which operated in 1944–1950".
- Žygimantų 10: Stasys Šalkauskis's house
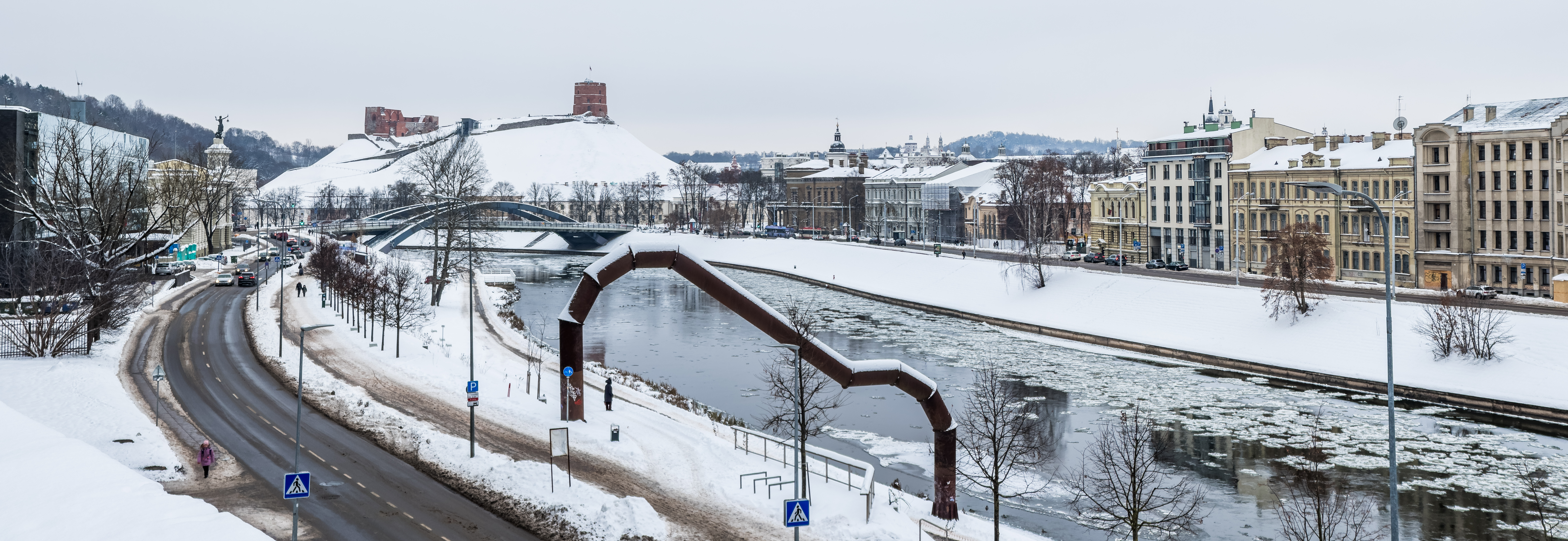
Panoramic view of the buildings on the Žygimantų Street (on the right) from the other side of Neris river.
