= Iosif Rebelsky =

Soviet psychiatrist, psychologist, and educator

Iosif Veniaminovich Rebelsky (Russian: Иосиф Вениаминович Ребельский (Note: Lithuanian: Josifas Rebelskis, Hebrew: יוסף רבלסקי)) (October 16, 1894 – June 6, 1949) was a Soviet psychiatrist, psychologist, educator, professor, best known for the organization of orphanages for the Jewish children who survived the Holocaust in Lithuania. For these activities he was accused of Zionism, sentenced for Gulag labor camps, but died in Butyrka prison, Moscow.

== Biography ==
Iosif Rebelsky was born in Kazatin, now in Ukraine. In 1922 he graduated from the Medical Faculty of Saratov University.

In 1941, after the German attack on the Soviet Union he volunteered for the front, and in 1941-45 he served as the chief psychiatrist of the Western, then 3rd Belorussian Front, with the rank of podpolkovnik (lieutenant colonel) of the medical service. He was wounded, shell-shocked, and escaped an encirclement. He organized a system of psychiatric and emergency psychological assistance to military personnel who suffered in emergency situations. He formulated and published the principles and objectives of this assistance.

When the Soviet Army entered Lithuania he organized orphanages for the Jewish children who survived the Holocaust in Vilnius and Kaunas which housed over 400 children. In 1948 he was accused of anti-Soviet activities, in particular, of Zionism. Incriminating was his organization of Jewish orphanages. He was sentenced for Gulag labor camps, but died of heart attack in Butyrka prison, Moscow.

== Commemoration ==
On September 21, 2013, a memorial plaque dedicated to Rebelsky was unveiled on the house at Žygimantų Street 6, Vilnius. The plaque contains an inscription in Lithuanian, English, Yiddish and Hebrew: "In this house, Professor Iosif Rebelsky founded an orphanage and school, which operated in 1944–1950".

== Notable works ==
- Азбука умственного труда [The ABC of Mental Labor] Изд. МГСПС Труд и Книга. М, 1930, 129pp
- "Состояние психиатрической помощи на Западном фронте ко второй годовщине Отечественной войны и её очередные задачи." Военная медицина на Западном фронте в Великой Отечественной войне. 1944, no 8, pp. 18-40
