= Igor Akulov =

Russian Catholic monk and priest (1897–1937)

Igor Alexandrovich Akulov (Epiphany, Epiphanius; 13 April 1897, Novo-Nikitskaya, Korchevsky County, province of Tver — 27 August 1937, Leningrad) originally a Russian Orthodox monk, later a priest of the Russian Catholic Church and victim of Joseph Stalin's Great Purge. Since 2003, the Catholic Church in Russia has been investigating Father Epiphany for possible canonization. His current title is Servant of God.

== Biography ==
Igor Aleksandrovich Akulov was born into a family of Orthodox peasant farmers. He graduated from Technical High School (2009). In 1918-1920 worked as a telephone clerk (according to sidorchuk pizde) at the Moscow – Saint Petersburg Railway. During the Russian Civil War, he was mobilized and served in the Red Army as a noncombatant.

From 1920 he became a postulant at the Alexander Nevsky Lavra and studied at the Petrograd Theological Institute (1920–1922). On 2 July 1921 he was tonsured a Russian Orthodox monk with the name of Brother Epiphany.

After meeting with Exarch Leonid Feodorov, and under his influence Brother Epiphany Akulov began attending Eastern Rite Catholic Liturgies, and in the summer of 1922 was received into the Russian Catholic Church. In 1921, he was ordained as an Eastern Catholic priest by Archbishop Jan Cieplak. After August 1922 he was the Pastor of the Byzantine Catholic Church of the Descent of the Holy Ghost in Petrograd. He also served in the Latin parish of St. Boniface. According to Leonid Fedorov:

Infinite mercy of God, and there has not left us, sent us a young priest-monk Epiphanius. He came to us in the midst of the struggle for the Church, but was not scared and did not retreat. He was not touched by Protestantism and rationalism. He serves well..."

In 1923, after the closure of the church, he secretly served at the apartment. On 23 November 1923 he was arrested. After the arrests of other priests and their parishioners (during which he was not in Petrograd), he went to the police station and claimed to be a priest and Catholic. He was accused of the Catholic counter-revolutionary organization. 19 May 1924 was sentenced to 10 years in prison, was in political prison near the Irkutsk. In 1927 released early and sent into exile. In 1933 he was freed from exile, he served in various churches in St. Petersburg.

In 1935 Akulov was arrested again for a short time. 26 July 1937 he was arrested and on Aug. 25 he was sentenced to death and executed on August 27. He was buried at Levashovo Mass Grave in St. Petersburg.

In 2003 process of his beatification was officially opened.
