= Russian Greek Catholic Church =

Eastern Catholic church

- Российская греко-католическая церковь (Russian)
- Type: Particular church (sui iuris)
- Classification: Christian
- Orientation: Eastern Catholic
- Polity: Episcopal
- Pope: Leo XIV
- Liturgy: Byzantine Rite

The Russian Greek Catholic Church (Note: Russian: Российская греко-католическая церковь, Rossiyskaya greko-katolicheskaya tserkov; Latin: Ecclesia Graeca Catholica Russica) or Russian Byzantine Catholic Church (Note: Russian: Российская католическая церковь византийского обряда, Rossiyskaya katolicheskaya tserkov vizantiyskogo obryada) is a sui iuris (self-governing) Byzantine Rite Eastern Catholic particular church that is part of the worldwide Catholic Church. It is in full communion with and subject to the authority of the Pope in Rome as defined by Code of Canons of the Eastern Churches.

Russian Catholics historically had their own episcopal hierarchy in the Russian Catholic Apostolic Exarchate of Russia and the Russian Catholic Apostolic Exarchate of Harbin, China. In 1907, Pope Pius X appointed Ukrainian Greek Catholic Metropolitan Andrey Sheptytsky, the Archbishop of Lviv, to be responsible for supporting Russian Catholics due to the precarious position of their Church within Russia. He continued in this role through World War II. Leonid Feodorov was the first Exarch of Russia, and was imprisoned and exiled by the Soviets for over a decade before his death in 1935. In 1939 Sheptytsky appointed his brother Klymentiy Sheptytsky as Exarch, and he died in a Soviet prison in 1951. Since the 1950s both Russian Catholic exarchates have been vacant, though they are listed as extant in the Annuario Pontificio.

In 1928, Pope Pius XI founded the Collegium Russicum, whose graduates have included Walter Ciszek, Pietro Leoni, and Theodore Romzha, as a major seminary to train their clergy. A Latin Church bishop, Bishop Joseph Werth, is currently the ordinary for Byzantine Catholics in Russia.

As of 2019, there were around 3,000 members of the church. An exarchate was established in 1917, and Soviet repression meant that Eastern Catholics went underground. Their outstanding figure, Mother Catherine Abrikosova, was subjected to a Stalinist-era show trial and spent more than 10 years in solitary confinement before her death in 1936. The position of Eastern Catholics in Russia – as opposed to that of Poles or Lithuanians in the Latin Church – is still tenuous, with little organisation in place. Their existence remains a flashpoint in Rome's relations with the Russian Orthodox leaders, who are intensely suspicious of Catholic activity in Russia.

== Background ==
According to Fr. Christopher Lawrence Zugger, the conversion of Kievan Rus in 988 at the orders of the Grand Prince of Kiev St. Vladimir the Great was an entry into a still unified Christendom. It was only over the centuries following the Great Schism in 1054 that anti-Papal and anti-Catholic beliefs grew as a result of the Church in Rus strengthening its alliance with the Ecumenical Patriarchate of Constantinople. In 1441, however, Grand Prince Vasily II of Moscow embraced Caesaropapism by ordering the imprisonment of Isidore of Kiev, the Metropolitan of Kiev and all Rus', for attempting to implement the reunion decrees of the Council of Florence, and his replacement by Metropolitan Jonah. It was only then that the Church in Rus' became definitively schismatic and non-Catholic. The schism was further cemented in 1588, when the Metropolitan See of Moscow was raised to a patriarchate by the Ecumenical Patriarch. By this time, the separation had become so complete that both churches accused each other of being heretics.

Out of all Eastern Orthodox Churches, what Max Weber was later to dub Caesaropapism reached its greatest extreme in the Tsardom of Russia, beginning when Ivan IV the Terrible assumed the title Czar in 1547 and gutted the independence of the Russian Orthodox Church from control by the State.

During a speech at the St. Procopius Unionistic Congress in 1959, Fr. John Dvornik explained, "...the attitude of all Orthodox Churches toward the State, especially the Russian Church is dictated by a very old tradition which has its roots in early Christian political philosophy... the Christian Emperor was regarded as the representative of God in the Christian commonwealth, whose duty was to watch not only over the material, but also the spiritual welfare of his Christian subjects. Because of that, his interference in Church affairs was regarded as his duty." This is not so say, however, that State control over the Russian Orthodox Church was always accepted without criticism or opposition.

In defiance of the Tsar's absolute power, St. Philip, the former Starets and Hegumen of the Solovetsky Monastery, located above the Arctic Circle, and Metropolitan bishop of Moscow, preached sermons in Tsar Ivan the Terrible's presence that condemned the indiscriminate use of state terror against real and imagined traitors and their entire families by the Oprichnina. Metropolitan Philip also withheld the traditional blessing from the Tsar during the Divine Liturgy. In response, the Tsar convened a Church Council, whose bishops obediently declared Metropolitan Philip deposed on false charges of moral offenses and imprisoned him in a monastery. When the former Metropolitan refused a request from the Tsar to bless his plans for the 1570 Massacre of Novgorod, Tsar Ivan allegedly sent Malyuta Skuratov to smother the former Bishop inside his cell. Metropolitan Philip was canonized in 1636 and is still commemorated within the Orthodox Church as a "pillar of orthodoxy, fighter for the truth, shepherd who laid down his life for his flock". Within the Russian Greek Catholic Church, Blessed Leonid Feodorov, the 20th century Exarch of Russia, is known to have had a very deep devotion to Metropolitan St. Philip of Moscow.

Over the centuries that followed, as growing numbers of members of the Eastern Catholic Churches fell under the rule of the House of Romanov as a result of the Khmelnytsky Uprising, the Great Northern War, and the Partitions of Poland, they similarly experienced escalating and brutal religious persecution.

For example, Tsar Peter the Great, whose anti-Catholicism and control over the Russian Church had already caused the martyrdom of Greek Catholic Deacon Peter Artemiev at Solovetsky Monastery on March 30, 1700, was so enraged on 11 July 1705 to see icons of Eastern Catholic Starets, bishop, and martyr St. Josaphat Kuntsevych inside the Basilian monastery church in Polotsk, that the Tsar immediately desecrated the Eucharist and then personally murdered several priests who attempted to retrieve it.

In 1721, the same Tsar and Theophan Prokopovich, as part of their Church reforms, replaced the Patriarch of Moscow with a department of the civil service headed by an Ober-Procurator and called the Most Holy Synod, which oversaw the appointment and deposition of the Church Hierarchy, as a further extension of the Tsar's Government.

Meanwhile, with the grudging exception of the Armenian Catholic Church, the Eastern Catholic Churches were increasingly treated as illegal in the Russian Empire beginning with the forced conversion of the Archeparchy of Polotsk-Vitebsk by Bishop Joseph Semashko between 1837 and 1839 and continuing with the 1874–1875 Conversion of Chelm Eparchy and the martyrdom of 13 unarmed men and boys by the Imperial Russian Army in the village of Pratulin, near Biała Podlaska on January 24, 1874.

It was almost certainly with these events in mind that Leonid Feodorov, the future Greek Catholic Exarch of Russia and Belarus, predicted at Anagni to a fellow Catholic seminarian more than a decade before the fall of the House of Romanov, "Russia will not repent without travelling the Red Sea of the blood of her martyrs and numerous sufferings of her apostles."

== Intellectual precursors ==
The modern Russian Catholic Church owes much to the inspiration of poet and philosopher Vladimir Sergeyevich Solovyov (1853–1900). Inspired by the writings of Fr. Ivan Gagarin, who had sought to win over the Russian Orthodox Church to reunification with the Holy See without abandoning either the Byzantine Rite or the traditional Church Slavonic liturgical language and the Divine Liturgy, Solovyov argued that, just as the world needed the Tsar as a universal monarch, the Church needed the Pope of Rome as a universal ecclesiastical hierarch. Solovyov further argued, however, that the Russian Orthodox Church, "is only separated from Rome de facto, so that one can profess the totality of Catholic doctrine while continuing to belong to the Russian Orthodox Church."

On August 9, 1894, a Russian Orthodox priest and protegé of Solovyov, Fr. Nicholas Tolstoy, entered into full communion with the Holy See by making profession of faith before Bishop Félix Julien Xavier Jourdain de la Passardière at the Church of St. Louis des Français in Moscow. Under oath, Fr. Nicholas renounced all contrary to Catholic doctrine and accepted both the Council of Florence and the First Vatican Council. At Fr. Nicholas's request, all documents relating to his conversion were conveyed to Pope Leo XIII, who kept them along with a personal archive of papers having "to do with matters in which the Pope was particularly interested".

The person most responsible for the creation of the Russian Greek Catholic Church, however, was Metropolitan bishop Andrey Sheptytsky of the Ukrainian Greek Catholic Church. According to his biographer Fr. Cyril Korolevsky, Sheptytsky's lifelong obsession with reuniting the Russian people with the Holy See goes back at least to his first trip there in 1887. Afterwards, Sheptytsky "wrote some reflections" between October and November of 1887, and expressed his belief, "that the Great Schism, which became definitive in Russia in the fifteenth century, was a bad tree, and it was useless to keep cutting the branches without uprooting the trunk itself, because the branches would always grow back."

Following his elevation to Metropolitan bishop of Lviv and Halych at the insistence of Emperor Franz Joseph in 1901, Metropolitan Andrey's interest in the Russian people continued. Posing as a Ukrainian lawyer on a pleasure trip, he made a secret visit to the Russian Empire in 1907, which he used as a cover for meeting and attempting to convert senior Russian Orthodox and Old Believer clergy.

== History ==
Tsarist policy of persecuting Eastern Catholics continued unchecked until the Russian Revolution of 1905, when Tsar Nicholas II grudgingly granted religious tolerance. Thereafter, communities of Russian Greek Catholics emerged and became organized. Old Believers were prominent in the early years of the movement.

=== Early history before the October Revolution ===
After the Russian Revolution of 1905, Metropolitan Andrey Sheptytsky, who was seeking to assume jurisdiction over the growing number of Eastern Catholics in Russia, had two audiences, in 1907 and 1908, with Pope Pius X in which the matter of creating an underground Byzantine Catholic Church in the Russian Empire was discussed at length. After being asked, the Pope confirmed Metropolitan Andrey's belief that he, instead of the local Roman Rite Bishops, already held jurisdiction over all Byzantine Catholics living under Tsarism. In order to spread the Catholic Church in Russia, the Pope also granted Sheptytsky all the authority of a Patriarch of a self-governing Eastern Catholic Church, but without the actual title, over the Russian Empire. In addition to the extremely rare privilege of communicatio in sacris as a tool of Greek Catholic evangelisation, Sheptytsky was told that he was free to ordain priests and even to consecrate bishops while reporting only to the Pope himself. Pope Pius advised Sheptytsky, however, to delay using his powers openly until a more opportune time, as otherwise the infamously anti-Catholic Imperial Russian government would cause an enormous amount of trouble for him.

Soon after, the semi-underground parish of the Russian Greek Catholic Church in St. Petersburg split between the followers of pro-Latinisation priest Fr. Aleksei Zerchaninov and those of pro-Orientalist priest Fr. Ivan Deubner. When asked by Metropolitan Andrey Sheptytsky to make a decision on the dispute, Pope Pius X decreed that Russian Greek Catholic priests should offer the Divine Liturgy Nec Plus, Nec Minus, Nec Aliter ("No more, No Less, No Different") than priests of the Russian Orthodox Church and the Old Believers.

After the outbreak of World War I, the heavily Eastern Catholic Kingdom of Galicia and Lodomeria in the Austro-Hungarian Empire was occupied by the Imperial Russian Army. Count Georgiy Bobrinsky, an infamously anti-Catholic member of the Tsarist civil service, was appointed as Governor General of a Province which had long been claimed as Russian territory by both extreme and moderate Slavophiles. A policy of anti-Eastern Catholic religious persecution, anti-Jewish pogroms, and forced Russification and both voluntary and forced conversions to Russian Orthodoxy was immediately implemented. Despite his efforts to maintain a purely apolitical stance, Metropolitan Andrey almost immediately became one of the many Habsburg loyalists, Ukrainophile intellectuals, and clergy of the Ukrainian Greek Catholic Church who were arrested by the Tsarist secret police and deported to Siberia. Despite angry questions being raised about his incarceration by members of the opposition in the Duma, Sheptytsky spent a total of three years as a prisoner of conscience held by the Russian Orthodox monks at the Monastery of Saint Euthymius in Suzdal.

After the February Revolution of 1917 and the forced abdication of Tsar Nicholas II, the new Russian Provisional Government ordered his release. Metropolitan Andrey Sheptytsky traveled immediately to St. Petersburg, where he convened an ecclesiastical council under the secret authority granted to him by Pope Pius X in 1907 and 1908. During the Council, taking place at the Church of St. Catherine from 18–29 May 1917, the Metropolitan organized the first Apostolic Exarchate for Russian Catholics with Most Reverend Leonid Feodorov, formerly a Russian Orthodox seminarian, as the first Exarch. Among the notable measures accepted at the 1917 synod were recognition of the pope as the head of the church, the use of the same rite as the Russian Orthodox Church rather than the Roman Rite, the acceptance of all saints of the Catholic Church, and the usage of the canon law of the Eastern Catholic Churches.

On 19 May 1917, Vladimir Abrikosov, who along with his wife Anna Abrikosova, had long been the driving force behind the formerly underground Russian Catholic parish in Moscow, was ordained to the priesthood by Metropolitan Andrey Sheptytsky of the Ukrainian Greek-Catholic Church. Even though the ordination of married men to the priesthood is allowed by the canon law of the Eastern Catholic Churches, the Abrikosovs had already taken a vow of chastity in a ritual which the rule of the Dominican Third Order at the time only very rarely permitted to married couples and only after first receiving the approval of "a prudent spiritual director."

On the feast of St. Dominic in August 1917, Anna Abrikosova took vows as a Dominican sister, assuming at that time her religious name in honor of Catherine of Siena, and founded a Greek-Catholic religious congregation of the Order in her Moscow apartment. Several of the women among the secular tertiaries joined her in taking vows as well. Thus was a community of the Dominican Third Order Regular, with Father Vladimir Abrikosov as its chaplain, established in what was soon to be Soviet Russia. Mother Catherine took as her motto in the religious life, "Christ did not come down from the Cross, they took Him down dead."

According to Father Georgii Friedman, Mother Catherine and the Sisters made an unusual choice for a religious community, inspired, it is believed, by the example of the Discalced Carmelite Martyrs of Compiègne during the French Revolution, "In addition to the three usual religious vows, the sisters took a fourth vow, to suffer for the salvation of Russia. God heard their desire, and soon they were to suffer much, for many years."

=== Persecution in the Soviet Union ===
The October Revolution and Anti-Catholic religious persecution soon followed, dispersing Russian Greek Catholics to Siberia, the Gulag and the Russian diaspora throughout the world.

At the same time, though, conversions continued to take place. In 1918, Fr. Potapy Emelianov, a former Priestless Old Believer and priest of the Old Ritualist tradition within the Russian Orthodox Church, entered into communion with the Holy See along with his entire parish, which was located at Nizhnaya Bogdanovka, near Kadiivka, in the Luhansk Oblast of modern Ukraine.

Meanwhile, Exarch Leonid Feodorov made presentations, participated in discussions with Orthodox clergy, including Patriarch Tikhon of Moscow and Metropolitan Benjamin of Petrograd. At the time, Patriarch Tikhon was faced with the ongoing Soviet-backed Living Church Schism and was determined defend the hard won independence of the Moscow Patriarchate from again being lost to control by the State. For this reason, Patriarch Tikhon was both meeting regularly to discuss possible reunion with both the Exarch and with Father Vladimir Abrikosov. The Patriarch was also urging those Orthodox clergy and laity who remained loyal to him to similarly meet with the Russian Catholics in order to discuss the possible reunion of the Russian Orthodox Church with the Holy See under the terms laid down at the Council of Florence in 1439.

This was why, when Fr. Edmund A. Walsh, the head of the American and Papal relief missions during the Russian famine of 1921, and the Exarch of the Russian Greek Catholic Church first met one another and conversed in Ecclesiastical Latin, Feodorov, who admired Patriarch Tikhon and felt only contempt for the so-called Living Church, urged that the Famine Relief food supplies be entrusted to not only to Catholic clergy, but also to those Russian Orthodox priests who remained loyal to Patriarch Tikhon for distribution to the starving. Fr. Walsh enthusiastically agreed with the Exarch's idea and ensured that it was carried out. In Orenburg alone, his assistant, Fr. Louis J. Gallagher hosted six local Russian Orthodox bishops to his table to organize the delivery of food supplies to the starving.

Meanwhile, according to historian Edward E. Roslof, to a much greater extent than the Rurikid and Romanov Tsars before them, the Soviet State and it's secret police, the GPU, had no intention of tolerating the possible reunion of East and West, and were especially determined to snuff out all efforts to preserve the continued independence of the Russian Orthodox Church from the State's power and control. For this reason, in the spring of 1923, along with multiple codefendants including Archbishop Jan Cieplak and Monsignor Konstanty Budkiewicz, Exarch Leonid Feodorov was prosecuted for counterrevolution and anti-Soviet agitation by Nikolai Krylenko. Feodorov was found guilty and sentenced to ten years in the Soviet concentration camps at Solovki, located above the Arctic Circle in the former Solovetsky Monastery in the White Sea.

During a conversation inside the anti-religious museum at Solovki with fellow Russian Greek Catholic political prisoner Julia Danzas, the Exarch revealed that felt profoundly moved to be incarcerated in the former monastery complex once led by St. Philip of Moscow. The Exarch also reverently kissed both the vestments once used by the former Hegumen and the stone which St. Philip had once used instead of a pillow. The Exarch commented, "On this stone, the Saint had not only radiant visions, but how many bitter tears did he shed!"

When Danzas described her own recent struggles inside the Irkutsk labor camp against spiritual despondency and doubt, the Exarch advised her, "That is well. The Lord will sustain you, but if ever the moment returns when you no longer feel this support, don't be frightened. The Lord's aid is perhaps precisely the most abundant when it seems that He has forsaken us."

During a later conversation, the Exarch confided in Danzas, "The true Messianism of the Russian Church is not what the Slavophiles have imagined, but it is the example of suffering. It is in this way that she shows that she is the continuation of Christ in this world."

Missions also continued among White émigrés in the Russian diaspora. Following her conversion, Hélène Iswolsky regularly attended the Divine Liturgy at the Church of the Holy Trinity, located near the Porte d'Italie in Paris. She later praised the pastor, Mgr. Alexander Evreinov, in her memoirs. Mgr. Alexander, Iswolsky wrote, offered the Byzantine Rite without the liturgical latinisations commonly added in Galicia and, "one might have thought oneself at an Orthodox service, except that prayers were offered for the Pope and our hierarchical head, the Archbishop of Paris." Iswolsky added that the chapel, although humble, "was decorated in the best of taste and according to the strictest Russian religious style; the iconostasis was the work of a Russian painter well-versed in ancient Eastern iconography. The central panel was a faithful copy of Rubleff's Trinity."

In 1928, a second Apostolic Exarchate was set up, for the Russian Greek Catholic refugees in China, based in Manchuria and led by Belarusian missionary priest Fabijan Abrantovich and based from the now ruined St. Vladimir's Cathedral in Harbin; the Russian Catholic Apostolic Exarchate of Harbin. Exarch Fabijan was arrested, however, by the NKVD after a visit to his family in the Second Polish Republic was interrupted by the beginning of the Second World War. After Exarch Fabijan was martyred in the Gulag, the Harbin Exarchate fell under the Omophorion of Exarchs Vendelín Javorka and Andrzej Cikoto, who both ultimately faced highly similar fates to Exarch Fabijan.

The Collegium Russicum, which was founded on August 15, 1929 by Pope Pius XI, was intended to train Russian Greek Catholic priests to serve as missionaries in the growing Russian diaspora of anti-communist political refugees and, despite the anti-religious persecution taking place in the Soviet Union, in that very country. The money for the college building and its reconstruction was taken from an aggregate of charity donations from faithful all over the world on the occasion of the canonization of St. Thérèse of Lisieux and the Pope chose to place the Russicum under her patronage. The Russicum faculty included the prominent Russian Symbolist poet, literary scholar, and Catholic convert Vyacheslav Ivanov.

=== The suppression of the church ===
Meanwhile, Russian Orthodox Archbishop Bartholomew Remov had at first supported the Deputy Patriarchal Locum Tenens Metropolitan Metropolitan Sergei's 1927 declaration of loyalty to the Soviet State. According to recent historian Irina Osipova, however, Metropolitan Bartholomew, "could not accept the harsh policy which Sergei adopted after the schism that divided the clergy in two camps. Bartholomew was disturbed by threats to visit punishment on every 'insubordinate' priest and by the mass arrests and sentencing of these recalcitrants."

In 1932, Bartholomew Remov was secretly received into the Russian Greek Catholic Church by underground Latin Bishop Pie Eugène Neveu. After Remov's conversion became known to Joseph Stalin's NKVD, the Archbishop was arrested on 21 February 1935 and was accused of being, "a member of the Catholic group of a counterrevolutionary organization attached to the illegal Petrovsky Monastery" and of anti-Soviet agitation. Neveu continued to receive Orthodox into the Catholic Church secretly during his time in Russia, until he had to leave in 1936 for medical treatment, after which he was not allowed to return by the Soviet government.

Exarch Leonid Feodorov died on 14 March 1935 at Viatka, Russia, where he had been assigned to live in internal exile following his release from the Gulag.

On June 17, 1935, a closed session of the Military Collegium of the Supreme Court of the Soviet Union sentenced Archbishop Bartholomew Remov "to the supreme penalty, death by shooting, with confiscation of property. The sentence is final and no appeal is allowed." Metropolitan Bartholomew Remov was executed soon after.

Mother Catherine Abrikosova died of spinal cancer based in the sacral bone in Butyrka prison on 23 July 1936. Similarly to Metropolitan Bartholomew Remov, her remains were secretly cremated and buried in a Mass grave at the Donskoy Cemetery of central Moscow.

Following the outbreak of the Second World War, several Greek Catholic Jesuit priests who had graduated from the Russicum in Rome, including Frs. Walter Ciszek, Pietro Leoni, Ján Kellner, Viktor Novikov, and Jerzy Moskwa, used the ensuing chaos as a means of entering the U.S.S.R. incognito with the intention of running clandestine apostolates there. All were captured almost immediately, having been betrayed by Alexander Kurtna, a convert from Estonian Orthodoxy, former Russicum seminarian, and NKVD mole, who worked between 1940 and 1944 as a lay translator for the Vatican's Congregation for the Eastern Churches. Ironically, Kurtna and Fr. Walter Ciszek, who had been friend at the Russicum, met once again in 1948 as fellow political prisoners in the Norillag labor camp region of the Soviet Gulag.

Meanwhile, because of the rigorous training and spiritual formation that Anna Abrikosova had given to the surviving sisters of her convent and the converts they made in secret over the decades following their arrests, the Russian Greek Catholic Church continued to exist on Soviet soil among both the sisters and the laity, even when there were no longer any Russian Catholic priests left to administer the Sacraments. This continued until 1979, when the surviving Sisters arranged for Soviet Jewish convert and former Jazz saxophonist Georgii Davidovich Friedmann to be secretly and illegally ordained by a Bishop of the underground Ukrainian Greek Catholic Church.

=== Russian Catholics in diaspora ===
In the Russian diaspora, there are Russian Catholic parishes and faith communities in San Francisco, New York City, El Segundo, Denver, Melbourne, Buenos Aires, Dublin, Paris, Chevetogne, Lyon, Munich, Rome, Milan, and Singapore. Many are all under the jurisdiction of the respective local Latin Church bishops. The communities in Denver, Dublin, and Singapore do not have a Russian national character but exist for local Catholics who wish to worship in the Russo-Byzantine style. The community in Denver is currently under the jurisdiction of the Ruthenian Catholic Eparchy of Phoenix.

The parishes in Asia and Australia are descended from the Exarchate of Harbin, established on 20 May 1928 by the Pontifical Commission for Russia document Fidelium Russorum. In the United States, the St. Andrew's Russian Greek Catholic Church was opened in El Segundo, California, in 1937, by a Collegium Russicum graduate. In 1945 the Our Lady of Fatima Russian Byzantine Catholic Church was opened in San Francisco by Russian emigrants from Harbin who went to the U.S. after World War II. One of its first priests was a Russian former tsarist diplomat who served at the Vatican and later became Catholic, joining the Jesuit order: Fr. Nikolai von Bok, SJ. In the late 1940s the rector of the Pontifical Russian College sent priests to serve communities in Latin America.

The former head of the Russian Catholic parish in Paris, Alexander Evreinov, was made the bishop of the Byzantine Rite in Rome in 1936, and was replaced in 1961 by Andrei Katkov. The next year Katkov was also named the apostolic visitator for all Russian Greek Catholic parishes in the world, at the Congregation for the Eastern Churches. In 1978 the pastor of the Holy Trinity Russian parish in Paris, Georgy Roshko, was named apostolic visitator. He remained as the visitator until 1991, when the Holy See decided to no longer have such a position. According to one account, as of 1992 "there survive a thousand or so Russian-rite Catholics in diaspora, with pastoral and sacramental care provided most often by priests trained at the Roman Collegium Russicum."

=== Post-Soviet developments ===
Following the collapse of the Soviet Union, the surviving Russian Greek Catholics, many of whom were directly connected to the Greek Catholic community of Dominican Sisters founded in August 1917 by Mother Catherine Abrikosova, began to appear in the open. At the same time, the martyrology of the Russian Greek Catholic Church began to be investigated. Tadeusz Kondrusiewicz, a bishop who was part of the revived Latin Catholic hierarchy in post-communist Russia, took the view that Russia should not be seen as a mission country, and believed that Rome should not seek to win over committed Russian Orthodox Christians.

In 2001, Exarch Leonid Feodorov was beatified during a Byzantine Rite Divine Liturgy offered in Lviv by Pope John Paul II. In 2003, a positio towards the Causes for Beatification of six of what Fr. Christopher Zugger has termed, "The Passion bearers of the Russian Catholic Exarchate": Fabijan Abrantovich, Anna Abrikosova, Igor Akulov, Potapy Emelianov, Halina Jętkiewicz, and Andrzej Cikoto; was submitted to the Holy See's Congregation for the Causes of Saints by the Bishops of the Catholic Church in Russia.

With the religious freedom experienced after the fall of Communism, there were calls from Russian Greek Catholic clergy and laity to for a new Exarch to the long existing vacancy. Such a move would have been strongly objected to by the Russian Orthodox Church, which caused Cardinal Walter Kasper to repeatedly persuade Pope John Paul II to refuse out of concern for damaging ecumenism. For the same reason, Cardinal Kasper repeatedly told Russian Catholics to their faces to either switch to the Latin Church or convert to Orthodoxy. In 2004, however, the Vatican's hand was forced when a convocation of Russian Greek Catholic priests met in Sargatskoye, Omsk Oblast and used their rights under canon law to elect Father Sergey Golovanov as temporary Exarch. The Pope then moved quickly to replace Father Sergey with Bishop Joseph Werth, the Latin Church Apostolic Administrator of Siberia, based in Novosibirsk. Bishop Werth was appointed by Pope John Paul II as ordinary for all non-Armenian Catholic Church Eastern Catholics in the Russian Federation. By 2010, five parishes had been registered with civil authorities in Siberia, while in Moscow two parishes and a pastoral center operate without official registration. There are also communities in Saint Petersburg and Obninsk. These communities and their statistics are not counted in the Annuario Pontifico.

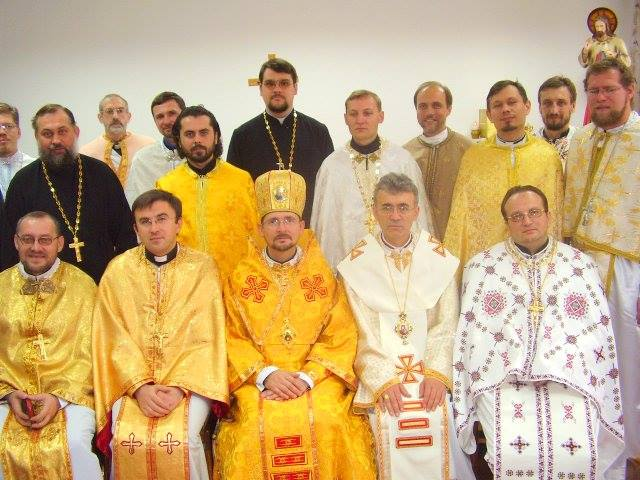
Russian Greek Catholic clergy in 2006. Bishop Joseph Werth is second from the right, first row

In a 2005 article, Russian Catholic priest Fr. Sergei Golovanov stated that three Russian Greek Catholic priests served on Russian soil celebrating the Russian Byzantine Divine Liturgy. Two of them used the recension of the Russian Liturgy as reformed by Patriarch Nikon of Moscow in 1666. The other priest used the medieval rite of the Old Believers, that is to say, as the Russian liturgical recension existed before Patriarch Nikon's reforms of the Russian Liturgy. All Eastern Catholics in the Russian Federation strictly maintain the use of Church Slavonic, although vernacular Liturgies are more common in the Russian diaspora.

As of 2014, the two Exarchates of Russia and Harbin are still listed in the Annuario Pontificio as extant, but they have not yet been reconstituted, nor have new Russian-Rite bishops been appointed to head them.

By 2018, there have been reports of 13 parishes and five pastoral points in Siberia with seven parishes and three pastoral points in European Russia. Some parishes serve the Ukrainians in Russia. The Ordinariate has minimal structure. A Byzantine Catholic mitered archpriest serves as Secretary to the Ordinary. There is a priest coordinator for the parishes in Siberia and a liturgical commission and a catechetical commission.

- 1997 – 2004 Protopresbyter Sergey Golovanov
- 2004 – present Bishop Joseph Werth (temporary)

== Hierarchy ==
=== Apostolic Exarchate of Russia ===
It has been vacant since 1951, having had only two incumbents, both belonging to the Ukrainian Studite Monks (M.S.U., a Byzantine Rite Ukrainian Greek Catholic Church monastic order):

- Blessed Leontiy Leonid Feodorov, M.S.U. (1917.05.28 – 1935.03.07)
- Blessed Klymentiy Sheptytsky, M.S.U. (1939.09.17 – 1951.05.01); also first Hegumen of Ukrainian Studite Monks (1919 – 1944.11), then Archimandrite of Ukrainian Studite Monks (1944.11 – 1951.05.01)
  - Bishop Viktor Novikov, S.J.; vice-exarch of Siberia (c. 1939 or 1940)

=== Apostolic Exarchate of Harbin ===
Name	Term	Order	Notes	Refs
Fabijan Abrantovich	20 May 1928 – 1939	Marian Fathers	Arrived in Harbin in September 1928. Recalled to Rome in 1933. Died 1946.	
Vendelín Javorka	1933–1936	Jesuit	Apostolic administrator sede plena	
Andrzej Cikoto	20 October 1939 – 13 February 1952	Marian Fathers	1933–1939 superior general of the Marian Fathers in Rome. Later made archimandrite. Died in office in prison	

== In popular culture ==
- Soviet dissident Alexander Solzhenitsyn interviewed surviving Russian Greek-Catholic Dominican sister Nora Rubashova in Moscow during his research process. For this reason, Mother Catherine Abrikosova and the persecution of her monastic community and of their fellow Russian Catholics by the Soviet Government are mentioned by Solzhenitsyn in the first volume of his 1973 non-fictional expose The Gulag Archipelago.
- The opening scene of the 1980 romantic comedy The Black Marble was filmed inside St. Andrew's Russian Greek Catholic Church in El Segundo, California.

== See also ==
- Anna Abrikosova
- Peter Artemiev
- Byzantine Rite
- Chevetogne Abbey
- Cathedral of the Immaculate Conception (Moscow)
- Church Slavonic language
- Eastern Catholic Churches
- Florentine Union
- Metropolitan Isidore of Kiev, All Russia and Moscow
- Niederalteich Abbey
- Russicum
- Theresa Kugel
- Vladimir Sergeyevich Solovyov
- Church of the Assumption of Mary (Astrakhan)
