= Lev Gillet =

Lev Gillet (born Louis Gillett; 8 August 1893 - 29 March 1980) was an archimandrite of the Eastern Orthodox Church. Brought up in the Catholic tradition, he joined the Orthodox Church in 1928 and worked for the union of the churches.

== Life ==
Louis Gillet was born on 8 August 1892 or 1893 in Saint-Marcellin, Isère, France. He studied in Grenoble and philosophy in Paris.

During World War I he was mobilised and posted to the front, where he made liaison with British troops. He was taken prisoner in 1914 and spent three years in captivity with British and Russian prisoners, when he was attracted by the spirit and the spirituality of the Orthodox Russian prisoners.

After the war he studied mathematics and psychology in Geneva, but he decided to join the Benedictines of Clairvaux in 1919. At this period he spent some time in the Benedictine house at Farnborough in Britain, and studying theology in Rome. Attracted by Eastern Christianity, he became acquainted with Dom Lambert Baudouin (who later founded the bi-ritual communities at Amay and Chevetogne) and Metropolitan bishop Andriy Sheptytsky of the Ukrainian Greek Catholic Church in Galicia and pronounced his final vows as Lev in 1925 at the Studite monastery of Univ Lavra in Galicia.

Disappointed by the attitude of the Catholic Church towards Orthodoxy, Gillet (with Alexander Deubner) was received into the Eastern Orthodox Church in Paris in May 1928 by Metropolitan Evlogii - with the approval, Fr Lev always maintained, of Metropolitan Andriy. In November 1928, he became rector of the parish of Sainte-Geneviève-de-Paris, the first French-speaking Orthodox parish.

In 1938 he left Paris to settle in London, within the framework of the Fellowship of Saint Alban and Saint Sergius, an ecumenical organization dedicated to the bringing together of the Anglican and Orthodox churches. At first he worked in various capacities - as warden of a boys' hostel, as a lecturer in the Quaker college in Birmingham, and serving the Society of Christians and Jews.

In 1947 he was invited by the Orthodox Youth Movement in Lebanon to become their chaplain there, and travelled to Lebanon at the beginning of 1948; but illness forced him to return to Britain later that year. He became a chaplain to the Fellowship in 1948 and resident at its headquarters in St Basil's House. He worked part-time for the Spalding Trust and the Movement for the Great Religions of the World. He remained in Britain until his death in 1980, going on many journeys abroad, in particular to France, Switzerland and Lebanon, where he took part in the spiritual revival of Antiochian Orthodoxy.

Principal publications in French (under the pseudonym "A Monk of the Eastern Church") include The Jesus Prayer, Introduction to Orthodox Spirituality, The year of grace of the Lord: A commentary on the Byzantine liturgical year and Jesus, simple gazes to the Saviour.

== Quotation ==
O strange Orthodox Church, so poor and weak, with neither the organization nor the culture of the West, staying afloat as if by a miracle in the face of so many trials, tribulations and struggles; a Church of contrasts, both so traditional and so free, so archaic and so alive, so ritualist and so personally involved, a Church where the priceless pearl of the Gospel is assiduously preserved, sometimes under a layer of dust; a Church which in shadows and silence maintains above all the eternal values of purity, poverty, asceticism, humility and forgiveness; a Church which has often not known how to act, but which can sing of the joy of Pascha like no other.{'La Quête de Vérité d'Irénée Winnaert' by Vincent Bourne - Geneva: Labor et Fides, 1966. p.335. partly quoted on p.24 of 'The Inner Kingdom' by Metropolitan Kallistos Ware - St Vladimir's Seminary Press, 2001 }

== Works ==
- Gillet, Lev (1942), Communion in the Messiah: Studies in the Relationship between Judaism and Christianity, Lutterworth Press, republished by James Clarke (2002), ISBN 978-0-227-17225-4
- Gillet, Lev (1993). Lev Gillet, "un moine de l'Eglise d'Orient": Un libre croyant universaliste, évangélique et mystique (L'Histoire à vif). Editions du Cerf. ISBN 2-204-04886-0.
- Gillet, Lev (1988), 'Encounter at the Well', Mowbray. ISBN 0-264-67025-6
- Gillet, Lev (1977), 'In Thy Presence', St Vladimir's Seminary Press. ISBN 0-913-83634-6
