= Vladimir Beneshevich =

Scholar of Byzantine history and canon law (1874–1938)

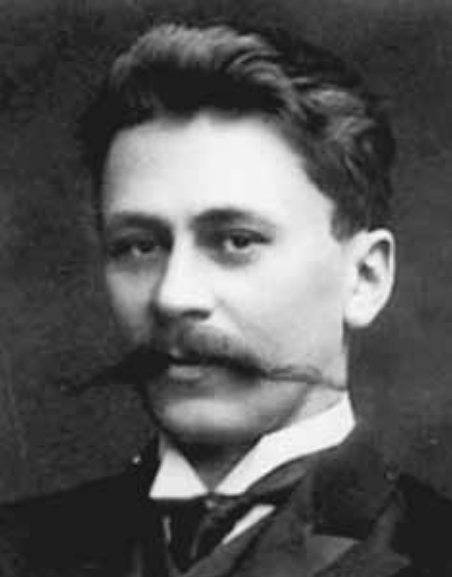
- Born: August 9, 1874; Druya, Russian Empire
- Died: January 17, 1938 (aged 63); Leningrad, USSR
- Known for: Studies of Byzantine history and canon law

Vladimir Nicolayevich Beneshevich (Russian: Влади́мир Никола́евич Бенеше́вич; August 9, 1874 – January 17, 1938) was a Russian scholar of Byzantine history and canon law, and a philologer and paleographer of the manuscripts in that sphere.

Beneshevich was a corresponding-member of the Bavarian Academy of Sciences from 1914, of the Russian Academy of Sciences from 1924, and of the Prussian Academy of Sciences and of the Strassburg Academy of Sciences from 1929.

Beneshevich was executed by the Soviet regime in 1938, and is one of the Eastern Orthodox Church's "New Martyrs".

== Biography ==
Vladimir Nicolayevich Beneshevich was born on August 9, 1874, in Druya, Vilna Governorate of the Russian Empire (now Vitebsk Region in Belarus). He was of Belarusian ethnicity. His father was a bailiff at the local court, and his grandfather was a priest of the Russian Orthodox Church. He had one brother, Dmitri, who was three years older.

Beneshevich graduated 'first class' from Vilnius Gymnasium in 1893. He then studied law at the Saint Petersburg State University from 1893 to 1897, graduating with a first-degree diploma. From 1897 until 1901 he studied philosophy, law, and history in Germany, first at the University of Heidelberg, then at the University of Leipzig, and finally at the Humboldt University of Berlin. Upon his return to Russia, he married Amata Ludmila Faddeevne (1888–1967), daughter of professor of classical philology Faddei Zielinski at the University of St. Petersburg. The Beneshevichs had three sons: Nikita (1910–1918) and the twins Dmitri (1911–1937) and George (1911–1937).

Between 1900 and 1905 Beneshevich worked in libraries in Europe and the Middle East, studying Slavic and Byzantine written sources, and participated in his first archaeological expeditions to the ancient religious center of Mount Athos, Mount Sinai, Egypt, Greece, Asia Minor, and Palestine. He was granted access to handwritten monastic collections in 49 European libraries, and worked in Paris, Vienna, Munich, and Rome, discovering many hitherto-unknown legal monuments in the process. The main focus of his research activities was to reconstruct the history of Greco-Roman law, based on a systematic source base. He also briefly (1903–1904) taught history of canon law at the Alexander Lyceum. His research findings were published in his master's thesis on The Story of the Sources of Canonical Law of the Greek Orthodox Church (Note: Full title: Канонический сборник XIV титулов со второй четверти VII века до 883 года. К древнейшей истории источников права греко-восточной церкв "Canonical Collection of 14 titles from the 2nd half of the 7th century to 883. The story of the sources of Canonical Law of the Greek Orthodox Church".) in 1905, for which he received a Master of Church Law. He had also discovered three new fragments of the Codex Sinaiticus (these are now housed at the Russian National Library in Saint Petersburg).

In 1905, Beneshevich was appointed privat-docent of Byzantine history at the faculty of history and philology at the University of St. Petersburg. In 1908, Benshevich was appointed editor of the journal Обозрения трудов по славяноведению, a post that he would hold until 1918.

In 1909, Beneshevich was appointed extraordinary professor, and shortly thereafter ordinary professor of Byzantine history. He also lectured extensively on paleography, and, from 1906 onwards, on the history of canon law at the university's faculty of law, at the St. Petersburg Theological Academy (1906–1909), at the summit of women's courses (1909–1917), at the Raeva (1910–1911), and at the Military Academy of Law (1909–1912).

In 1912, Beneshevich received a doctor of law from the Athens State University. In the same year, and together with egyptologist Boris Alexandrovich Turayev and linguist Nikolay Yakovlevich Marr, Beneshevich initiated the founding of the journal Christian East under the auspices of the Imperial Academy of Sciences.

In 1914, on the eve of World War I, Beneshevich published his doctoral thesis on the Synagogue among the 50 works and other Canonical Collections of John Scholasticus. (Note: Originally: Синагога в 50 титулов и другие юридические сборники Иоанна Схоластика.) He was granted a Doctor of Church Law the same year.

Between 1917 and 1918 Beneshevich served as secretary to the Council of the Russian Orthodox Church. Between 1919 and 1926 he served in several different capacities in the Church's archives and libraries; from 1923 to 1926, as head of the Public Library of the History of Material Culture Academy, and from 1925 to 1926 as head librarian of the Greek manuscripts department of manuscripts Public Library in Leningrad.

In July 1922, and again in 1924, he was arrested in connection with the Case of the Metropolitan Benjamin, but was not held long in either instance.

In 1926, Beneshevich was appointed Secretary of the Byzantine Commission of the USSR. In 1927, he was granted permission to travel to Germany on a three-month scientific mission, where he had the opportunity to study a number of Greek manuscripts. Shortly before his return, the Bavarian Academy of Sciences offered to translate his work on John Scholasticus. Beneshevich consented.

In early 1928, Beneshevich was elected corresponding–member to the Academy of Sciences of the USSR.

=== Imprisonment and execution, 1929–1938 ===
In November 1928, he was arrested on charges of spying for the Vatican, Germany and Poland. He was sentenced to three years' imprisonment and sent to Solovki prison camp. He was returned to Leningrad in 1930 to attend trial with his wife and brother on charges of sedition. In August 1931, he was sentenced to five years' imprisonment and sent to in the Ukhta-Pechora prison camp. The arrest and searches almost completely destroyed his collection of (copies of) ancient manuscripts. Of the 49 manuscripts known from his published prolegomena on them, only three survived. Some 2000 photographs were also destroyed.

At the request of the Old Bolshevik Vladimir Bonch-Bruevich, Beneshevich was released prematurely in March 1933. From 1933 Beneshevich then served as archivist of Greek manuscripts in public libraries, and lectured on Byzantine history at Leningrad State University.

The first German edition of his work on John Scholasticus was published in Munich in May 1937. In October, an article in Izvestia portrayed this as a betrayal, and questioned why a Russian scientific work was published in Nazi Germany. Beneshevich was dismissed from his post, and on November 27 was arrested on charges of spying for Germany.

Together with his twin sons and brother, who had been indicted on the same charges, Vladimir Nicolayevich Beneshevich was shot by the NKVD on 17 January 1938 in Leningrad. (Note: According to a Academy of Sciences membership roll from 1974, Beneshevich was executed on 19 December 1943. However, a document dated 27 February 1938 refers to the execution, which makes the 1943 date implausible. See also Andreyev 2007.)

Beneshevich was struck from the rolls of the Russian Academy of Sciences on 29 April 1938. He was exonerated of the charges of treason by a Military Tribunal LVO on 20 August 1958, over 20 years after his execution. Beneshevich was rehabilitated by the Academy of Sciences on 19 December 1958.

== Contributions ==
Vladimir Nicolayevich Beneshevich published more than 100 works related to Byzantine history and culture. The most important of these are:

- Два списка славянского перевода синтагмы Матфея Властаря, хранящиеся в СПб-кой синодальной библиотеке: Описание их и тексты неизд. ст. Saint Petersburg, 1902.
- Канонический сборник XIV титулов со второй четверти VII в. до 883 г. К древнейшей истории источников права греко-восточной церкви. Saint Petersburg, 1905.
- Древнеславянская кормчая XIV титулов без толкования. СПб, 1907. Т. 1; Sofia, 1987. Т. 2.
- Армянский пролог о св. Борисе и Глебе. Saint Petersburg, 1909.
- Ответы Петра Хартофилакса. Saint Petersburg, 1909.
- Описание греческих рукописей монастыря св. Екатерины на Синае. Saint Petersburg, 1911—1917. Т. 1—3.
- Синагога в 50 титулов и другие юридические сборники Иоанна Схоластика. К древнейшей истории источников права греко-восточной церкви. Saint Petersburg, 1914.
- Сборник памятников по истории церковного права, преимущественно русской церкви до эпохи Петра Великого. (2 issues) Saint Petersburg, 1915.
- Вазелонские акты. Материалы для истории крестьянского и монастырского землевладения в Византии VIII—XV веков. Л., 1927 (posthumously together with Ф. И. Успенским).
- Corpus scriptorum juris graeco-romani tam canonici quam civilis. Sofia, 1935.

== See also ==
- Varlam Shalamov
- Persecution of Christians in the Soviet Union
