= Druya =

Druja Друя
- Agrotown
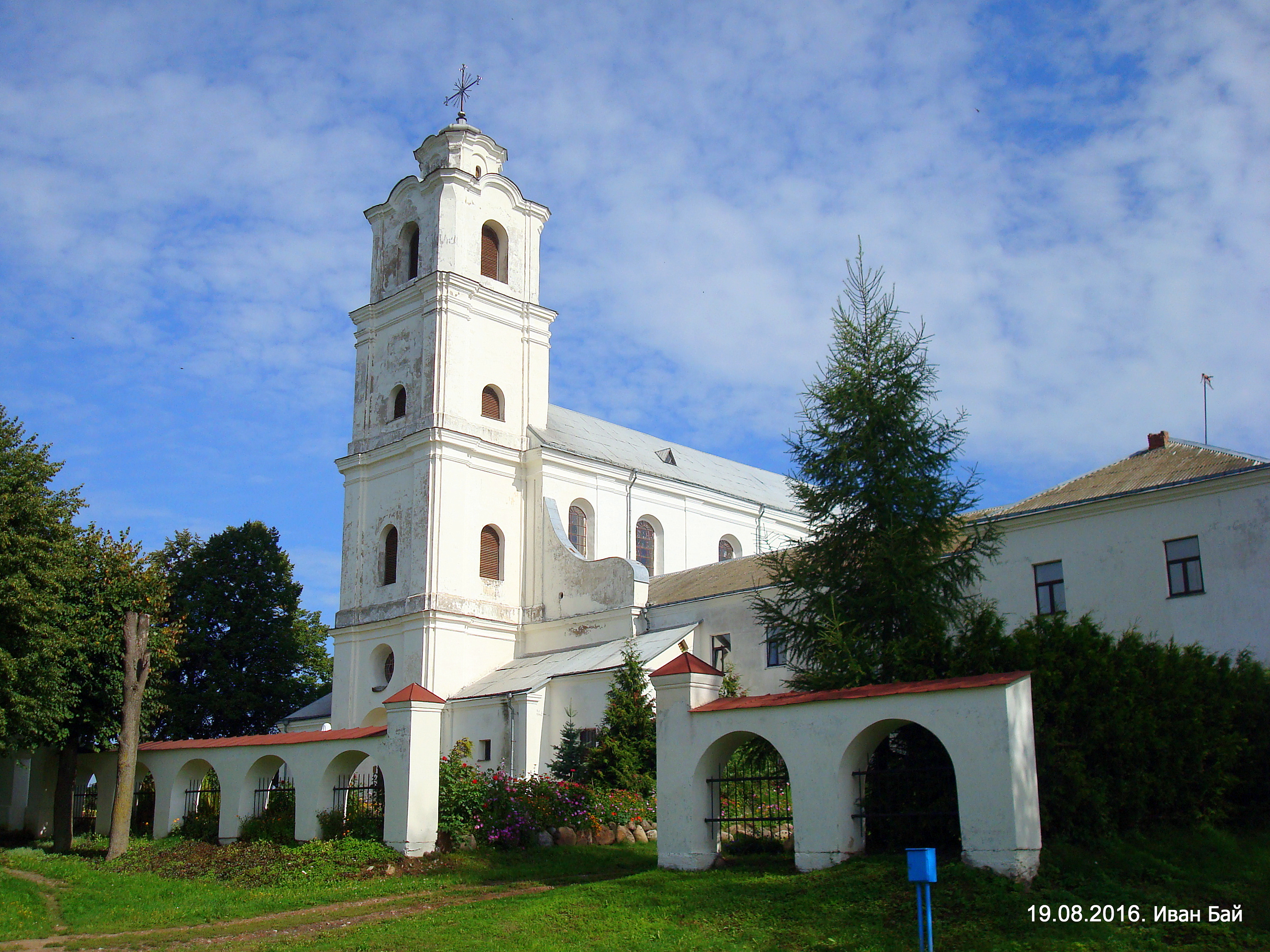
- The Sapiezhyn church of the Trinity

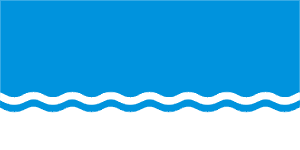
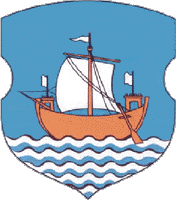
- Flag Coat of arms

- Location within Belarus
- Coordinates: 55°47′N 27°27′E
- Country: Belarus
- Region: Vitebsk Region
- District: Braslaw District

Population (2006)
  - Total: 1,500
- Time zone: UTC+3 (MSK)

Druja (Belarusian: Друя; Russian: Друя; Polish: Druja; Yiddish: דרויע) is an agrotown in Braslaw District, Vitebsk Region, Belarus. It is located on the left bank of the Western Dvina, at the mouth of the Druyka River, opposite the Latvian parish of Piedruja. It is situated about 30 kilometres (19 mi) northeast of Braslaw. The population is about 1,500 (2006).

== History ==
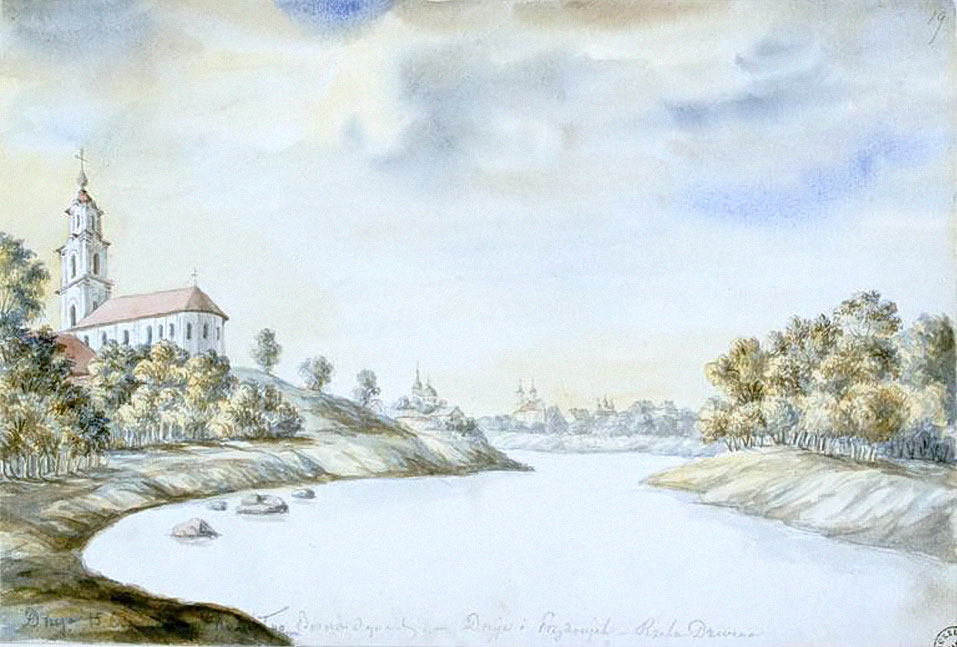
View of Druya, by Napoleon Orda

Medieval Druja was a stronghold of the Massalski princely family fought over by the Grand Duchies of Lithuania and Muscovy through much of the 16th and 17th centuries. Maciej Stryjkowski mentions it in his chronicle when describing the events of 1386. Ownership passed to the Sapieha family in the 17th century. The fortified suburb of Sapieżyn was founded by Jan Stanisław Sapieha in 1618. The illuminated Druja Gospels date from 1580.

In the 1921 census, 49.8% people declared Polish nationality, 33.8% declared Jewish nationality, 11.5% declared Belarusian nationality, and 3.4% declared Russian nationality.

Following the joint German-Soviet invasion of Poland, which started World War II in September 1939, the town was first occupied by the Soviet Union until 1941, then by Nazi Germany until 1944, and re-occupied by the Soviet Union afterwards, which eventually annexed it from Poland in 1945.

== Monasteries ==
Druja's oldest building is a Baroque Catholic church of the Trinity in the part of town known as Sapiezhyn. It was built in the 1640s and later expanded. The church was previously part of a Bernardine monastery.

In the interwar period Jurgis Matulaitis-Matulevičius initiated the foundation of a Marian monastery for Belarusians in Druya - which was initially led by Andrei Tsikota. The monastery housed a school where a number of prominent Belarusian personalities were educated, including Cheslaus Sipovich, Jazep Hermanovich, Tamaš Padzjava and Uladzislaŭ Čarniaǔski.

== Jewish community ==
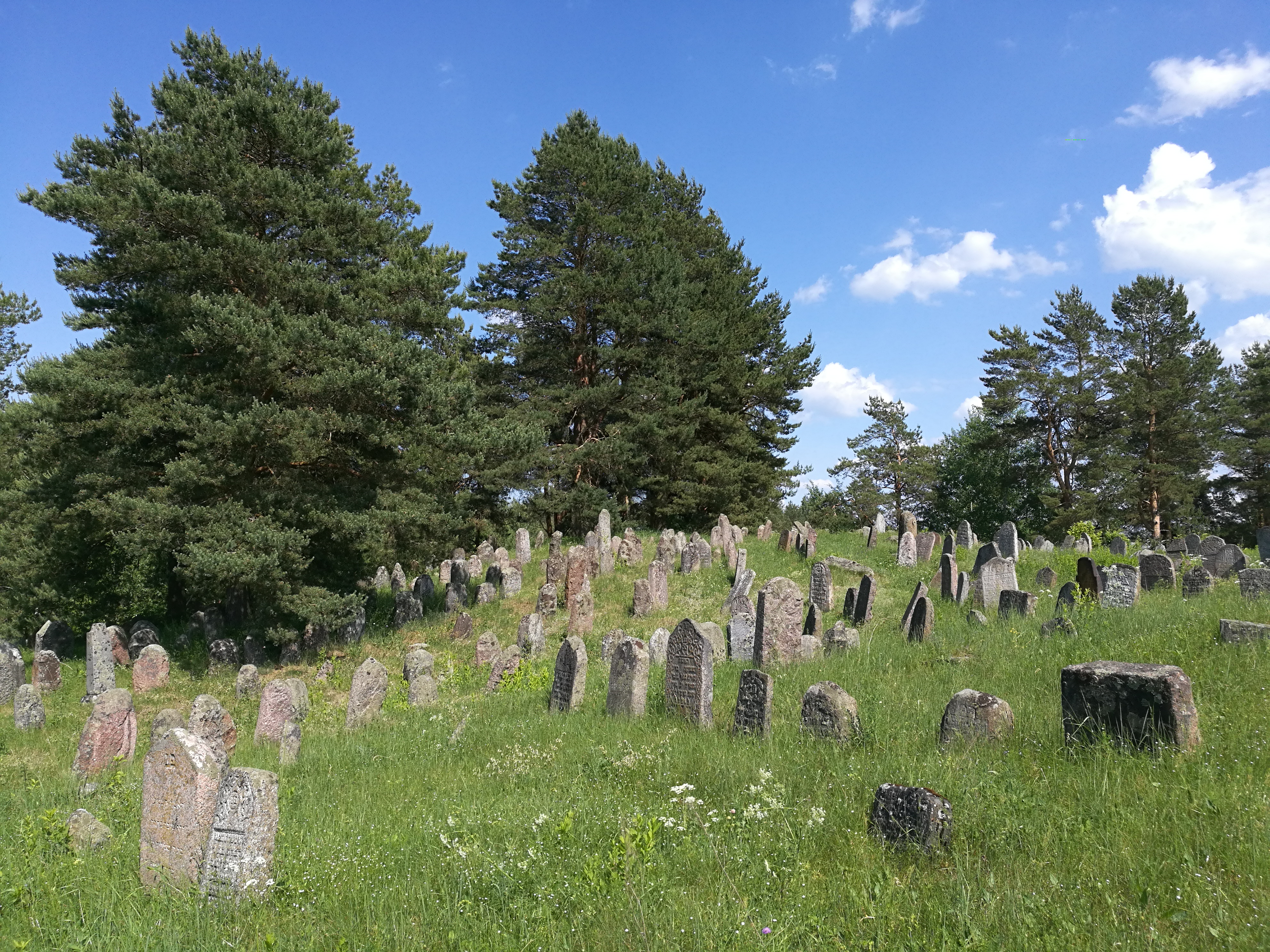
Gravestones at the Jewish cemetery

Druja was formerly known for its thriving Jewish community, around 2,200 Jews lived in Druya on the eve of World War II (half of the whole local population). The father of Nobel Literature Prize winner Saul Bellow was from Druja.

Most of the town's Jewish population was killed during the Holocaust by Nazi German forces in 1942. The German troops had occupied Druja by early July 1941; a ghetto was created in April–May 1942. On June 17, 1942, the Germans and the local police surrounded the ghetto. A fire broke out and burned the ghetto and the nearby orthodox church. The Jews from the ghetto were gathered near the Druyka River and shot into a large grave. More than 1,000 Jews were killed in Druya.

== Notable people ==
- Fabijan Abrantovich, Belarusian Roman Catholic priest and social activist, was active in Druya
- Vladimir Beneshevich, scholar, born there
- Alter Druyanov, writer, editor, translator, folklorist, journalist, historian of early Zionism, and Zionist activist was born there and took his pen name, Druyanov, from the town
- Jazep Hermanovich, Belarusian Eastern Catholic priest, poet and Gulag survivor was active in Druya for some time
- Jury Kashyra, Roman Catholic priest, was active in Druya
- Abraham Resnick studied under Rabbi Abraham Zadok Bagin in Druya
- Ceslaus Sipovich attended catholic school in Druja
- Andrei Tsikota, Belarusian Roman Catholic and Greek Catholic priest, was active in Druya

== Gallery ==
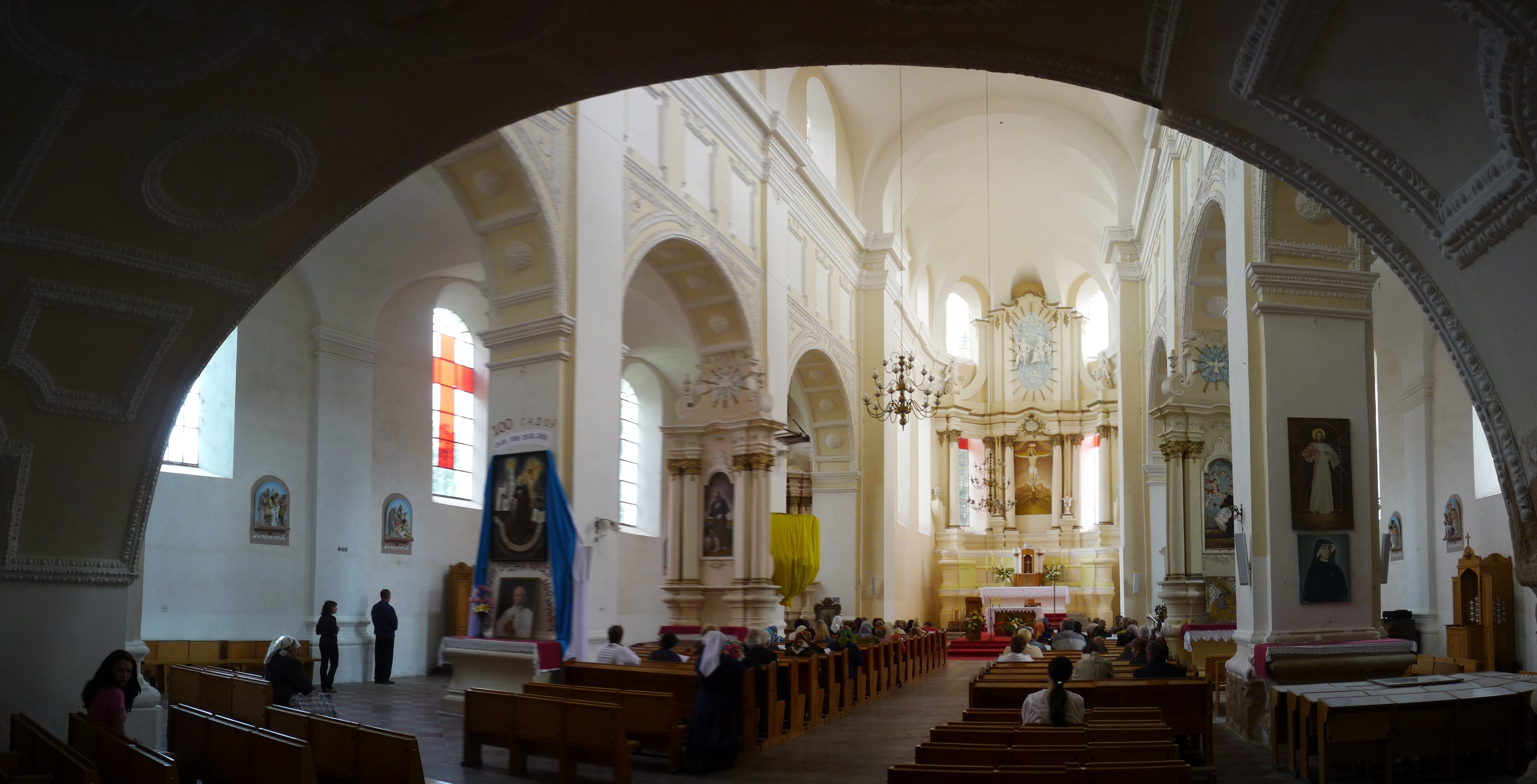
Divine service in the Sapiezhyn church

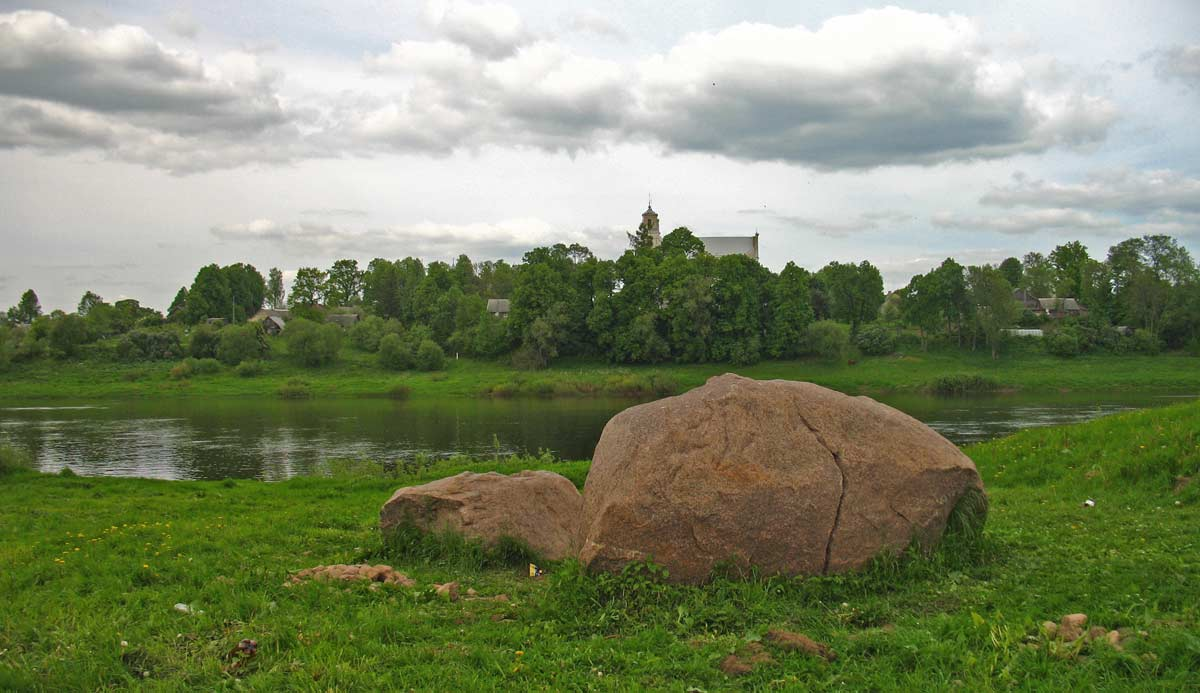
A Boris stone retrieved from the Drujka River has become a local tourist attraction.
