= Russian Catholic Apostolic Exarchate of Harbin =

Eastern Catholic ecclesiastical jurisdiction in China

Apostolic Exarchate of Harbin Exarchatus Apostolicus Harbinensis 俄羅斯禮天主教哈爾濱宗座代牧區 Апостольский экзархат Харбина

Location
- Country: China
- Headquarters: Harbin, China

Information
- Denomination: Catholic Church
- Sui iuris church: Russian Greek Catholic
- Rite: Byzantine Rite
- Established: 1928
- Cathedral: Cathedral of St. Vladimir, Harbin
- Language: Church Slavonic, Russian

Current leadership
- Pope: Leo XIV
- Ordinary: sede vacante

The Russian Catholic Apostolic Exarchate of Harbin is a dormant apostolic exarchate of the Russian Byzantine Catholic Church based in the city of Harbin in China. The cathedra of the apostolic exarchate was in the Cathedral of St. Vladimir in Harbin, which is now in ruins. The apostolic exarchate also had churches in Shanghai and Beijing.

From the 1890s to the 1930s Harbin attracted Russian immigrants, including railway workers and later white émigrés fleeing the Revolution and Civil War and the rise of Stalin. Harbin Russians included Russian Orthodox, Polish Latin Catholic, and Jewish congregations. In 1926 Ivan Koronin's parish converted from Orthodox to Catholic. Although most went back after Koronin's death, about 40 remained to form the nucleus of the Eastern Catholic congregation. On 20 May 1928 the Pontifical Commission for Russia issued the decree Fidelium Russorum establishing an ordinariate at Harbin to cater for Russians of the Byzantine Rite, and "all Catholics of the Oriental Rites", in China. It was later transformed into an apostolic exarchate. Ordinariates and apostolic exarchates are exempt jurisdictions, not part of any ecclesiastical province but rather directly subject to the Holy See, in Harbin's case through the Congregation for the Oriental Churches as successor to the Pontifical Commission for Russia. The ordinary or apostolic exarch would be from the Congregation of Marian Fathers of the Immaculate Conception, a Polish Latin Catholic order. In 1939 Andrzej Cikoto obtained Pius XII's consent for a Byzantine Rite branch of the Marian Fathers. In the Chinese Communist Revolution, the Russian Catholic clergy were arrested and deported to the Soviet Union. The apostolic exarchate has had no ordinary since 1952 and is in fact discontinued till further papal notice. Russian Catholic communities in Melbourne, New York, Buenos Aires, and São Paulo have Harbin heritage.

Ordinaries of the Apostolic Exarchate of Harbin
Name	Term	Order	Notes	Refs
Fabijan Abrantovich	20 May 1928 – 1939	Marian Fathers (MCI)	Arrived in Harbin in September 1928. Recalled to Rome in 1933. Died 1946.	
Vendelín Javorka	1933–1936	Jesuit (SJ)	Apostolic administrator sede plena	
Andrzej Cikoto	20 October 1939 – 13 February 1952	Marian Fathers (MCI)	1933–1939 superior general of the Marian Fathers in Rome. Later made archimandrite. Died in office in prison	
