= Andrei Tsikota =

Belarusian priest and politician (1891–1952)

Andrei Tsikota 祁高德
- Exarch and Apostolic Administrator for Catholics of the Eastern Rite in Manchuria
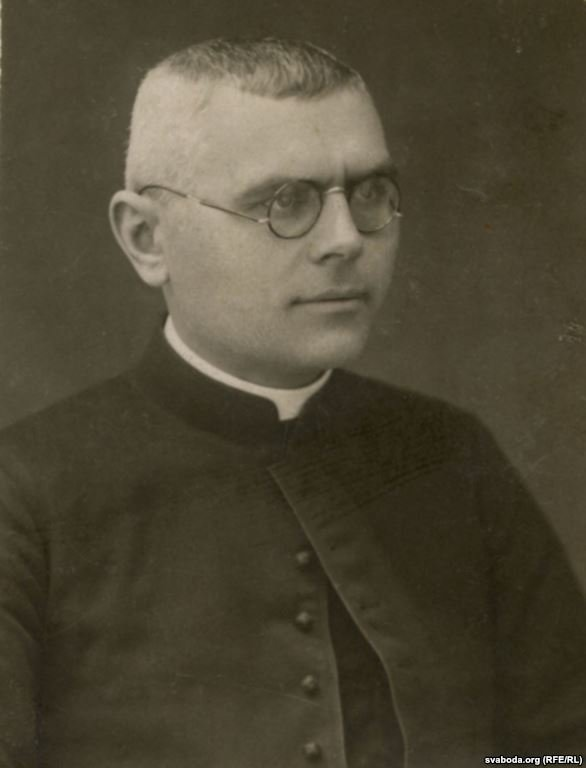
- Native name: Андрэй Цікота
- Church: Catholic Church
- Archdiocese: Russian Catholic Apostolic Exarchate of Harbin
- Appointed: 20 October 1939
- Term ended: 13 February 1952
- Predecessor: Vendelín Javorka
- Previous post: Superior General of the Congregation of Marian Fathers of the Immaculate Conception

Orders
- Ordination: 13 June 1914 by Vincent Kliuchynski

Personal details
- Born: 5 December 1891 Plavushka, Sventsyansky Uyezd, Russian Empire (now Belarus)
- Died: 11 February 1952 (aged 60) near Bratsk, Soviet Union
- Denomination: Catholic

Archmandrite Andrei Tsikota MIC (/(t)sɪˈkoʊtə/; Chinese: 祁高德;Belarusian: Андрэй Цікота; Polish: Andrzej Cikoto), also anglicised as Andrew Cikoto (5 December 1891 – 11 February 1952), was a Belarusian Roman Catholic and Greek Catholic priest, Superior General of the Congregation of Marian Fathers of the Immaculate Conception, Ordinary of the Russian Catholic Apostolic Exarchate of Harbin, member of the Rada of the Belarusian Democratic Republic.

== Early life and education ==
Andrei Tsikota was born into a peasant family in Plavushka, now Smarhon District, northwestern Belarus, then part of the Russian Empire. He graduated from a gymnasium in Ashmiany, Vilnius Priest Seminary and from the Saint Petersburg Roman Catholic Theological Academy (1917). On 13 June 1914, he was ordained to the priesthood by Archbishop Vincent Kliuchynski. After graduation, Fr. Tsikota served as the pastor of the Maladzechna parish.

In May 1917, Tsikota participated in the first congress of Belarusian Roman Catholic clergy that took place in Minsk.

In 1918, Tsikota moved to Minsk to teach at a priest seminary. In the same year, he also became member of the Rada of the Belarusian Democratic Republic. In 1919, he was member of the Provisional Belarusian National Committee (Belarusian: Часовы беларускі нацыянальны камітэт), a Belarusian coordination body on the territory controlled by Poland during the Soviet-Polish War.

== In interwar Poland ==
In 1920, Tsikota entered the novitiate of the Congregation of Marian Fathers, making his first vows in September 1921. Between 1921 and 1923, Tsikota was on a mission in the United States, serving the Lithuanian American community as well conducting retreats parish missions for Lithuanian, Polish, and Belarusian immigrants.

After returning to the Second Polish Republic in 1923, Tsikota served at the Marian parish in Druja, West Belarus. He was instrumental in the organization of a local school and supervised the organization of the Congregation of the Sisters Handmaids of Jesus in the Eucharist. In 1925 he became Novice Master at the newly opened Belarusian Marian novitiate in Druja.

In interwar Poland, Tsikota was an active leader of the Belarusian Greek Catholic Church and advocated for the revival of the Belarusian language into the Catholic Church in Belarus. Tsikota had to face obstacles by the Government of the Second Polish Republic and its discriminatory policies towards the Belarusian minority.

In July 1927, Fr. Tsikota represented Belarusian Greek-Catholic Church at the Fifth Uniate Congress in Velehrad (Czechoslovakia).

Between 1933 and 1939 Tsikota was twice elected Superior General of the Congregation of Marian fathers in Rome. While performing his duties, he continued to support the Belarusian catholic institutions in Druja.

== Mission in Harbin ==
In 1939 Tsikota was appointed exarch and Apostolic Administrator for Catholics of the Eastern Rite in Manchuria, replacing Archimandrite Fabijan Abrantovich, a different Belarusian Marian father and Greek Catholic priest holding that title, who had been arrested by the Soviets in occupied former Eastern Poland.

== Imprisonment and death ==
In December 1948, Tsikota and a small group of Harbin-based Catholic priests, including the Belarusians Jazep Hermanovich and Tamash Padziava, was arrested by communist Chinese authorities. The priests were handed over to the Soviet Ministry of State Security.

After several months of manipulative interrogations and solitary confinement, Tsikota and other priests were sentenced to 25 years in of labor camps.

Archimandrite Tsikota was brought to the Ozerlag subdivision of the Gulag concentration camp system. He died in a camp hospital near Tayshet, Irkutsk oblast, on February 13, 1952.

== Commemoration ==
A memorial cross dedicated to Archimandrite Tsikota has been erected by Belarusian Catholics in 2003 in Zhodzishki, Smarhon District, near his birthplace. The cross was consecrated by Siarhiei Hajek, Apostolic Visitor for Greek-Catholic Christians of Belarus.

Another memorial cross Andrei Tsikota was erected and consecrated in May 2012 on the Ozerlag camp cemetery in Irkutsk Oblast where Tsikota is buried.

In 2003, the Catholic Church in Russia under Archbishop Tadevush Kandrusevich has initiated a process of beatification of Archimandrite Andrei Tsikota.

== See also ==
- Belarusian Greek Catholic Church
