= Butyrka prison =

Prison in Moscow, Russia

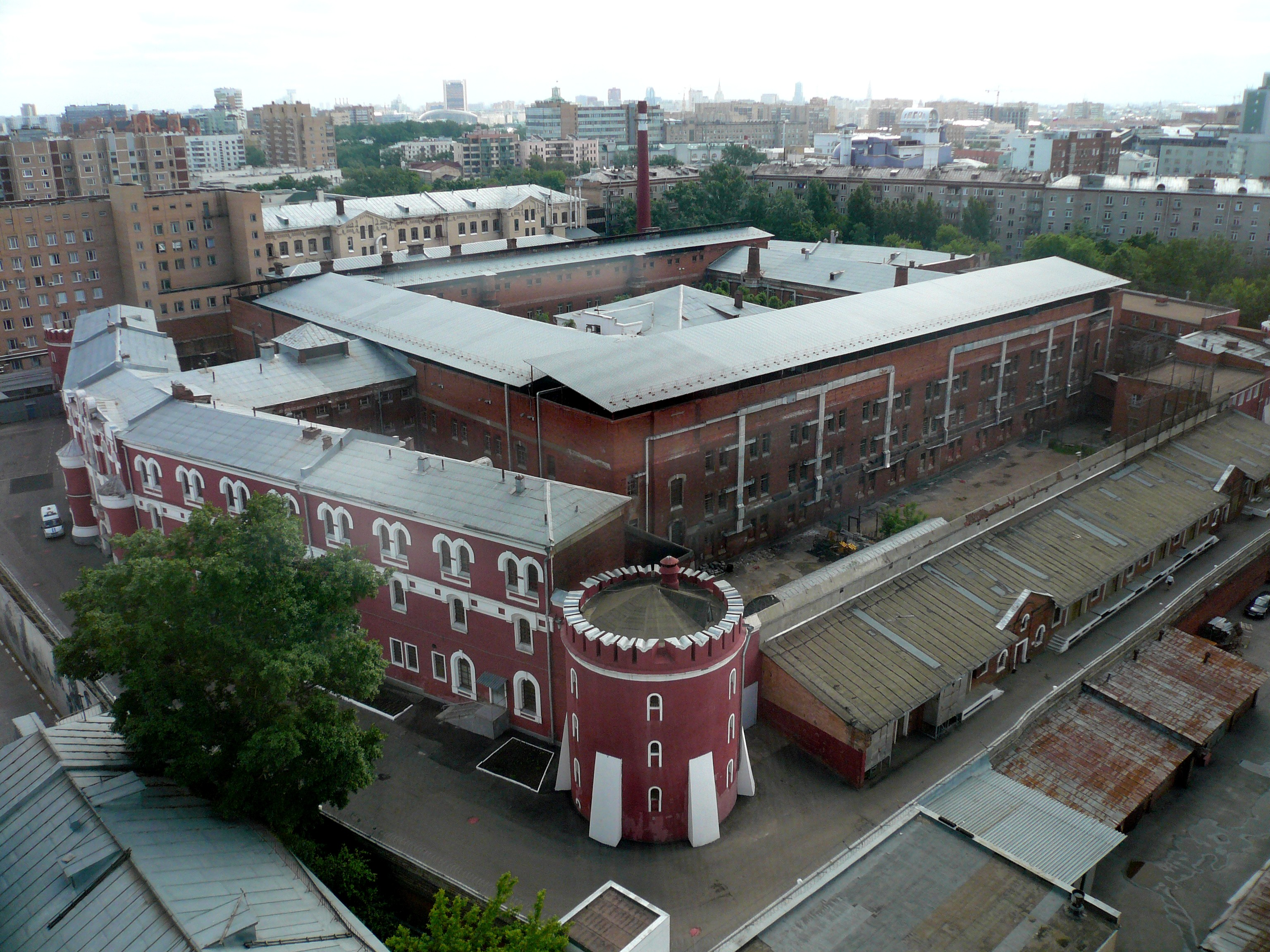
- The prison in 2010
- Interactive map of Butyrka prison
- Location: Sokolniki District, Moscow, Russia; 55°47′04″N 37°35′38″E
- Opened: 1771
- Managed by: Federal Penitentiary Service

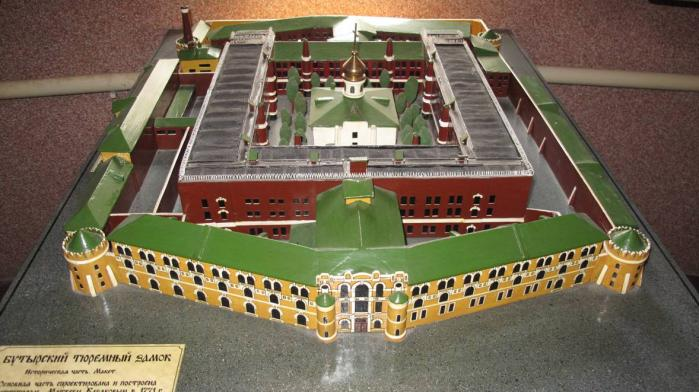
Butyrskaya prison (historical model)

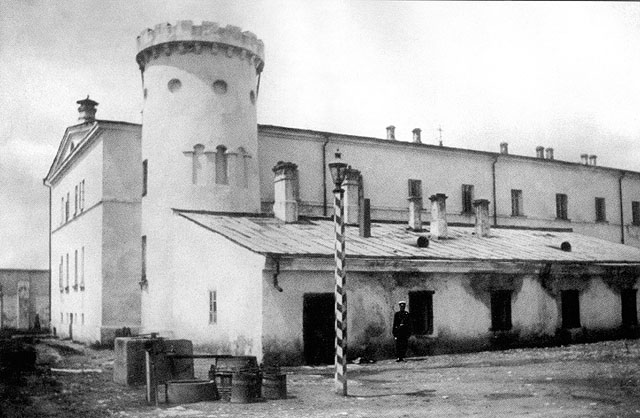
Butyrskaya prison, 1890s

Butyrskaya prison (Russian: Бутырская тюрьма, romanized: Butýrskaya tyurmá), colloquially known simply as Butyrka (Russian: Бутырка, IPA: [bʊˈtɨrkə]), is a prison in the Tverskoy District of central Moscow, Russia. In Imperial Russia it served as the central transit prison. Now it is a pretrial detention facility (remand prison).

During the Soviet Union era (1917–1991) it held many political prisoners. As of 2022 Butyrka remains the largest of Moscow's remand prisons. Overcrowding is an ongoing problem.

== History ==
The current building was erected in 1879 near the Butyrsk gate (Бутырская застава, or Butyrskaya zastava) on the site of a fortress-like prison which had been built by the architect Matvei Kazakov during the reign of Catherine the Great. The towers of the old prison housed, in particular, hundreds of participants of the 1863 January Uprising in Poland. Members of Narodnaya Volya were also prisoners of the Butyrka in 1883, as were the participants in the Morozov Strike of 1885. The Butyrka prison was known for its brutal regime. The prison administration resorted to violence anytime the inmates tried to protest.

Its famous inmates include the influential revolutionary poet Vladimir Mayakovsky, the Russian revolutionary Nikolay Bauman, and the founder of the KGB Felix Dzerzhinsky. During the February Revolution, the workers of Moscow freed all the political prisoners from the Butyrka.

Following the October Revolution, Butyrka remained a place of internment for political prisoners. During the Great Purge, about twenty thousand inmates at a time were imprisoned in Butyrka. Thousands of political prisoners were shot after investigations. Prominient political prisoners in Butyrka during the rule of Stalin included the writers Aleksandr Solzhenitsyn and Yevgenia Ginzburg.

== Living conditions ==
Varlam Shalamov notes in one of his tales, that the Butyrka is extremely hot in summer; Eduard Limonov, in his drama Death in the Police Van, emphatically agrees. He says that, with the collapse of the Soviet regime, overcrowding has become a real issue; there are more than one hundred inmates in cells meant to contain ten people. In a 2019 interview the warden of the prison said "The limit of our detention facility is 1,847 inmates. In fact, now when we are talking there are 2,292 people here." Most of these people are politically unreliable subjects from the Caucasus. Since epidemics are a problem, the wardens try to fill cells entirely with people with AIDS, or with tuberculosis; however, this does little to curb the problem, since many inmates are drug users, and there is at most one needle per cell. Moreover, inmates are brought to the tribunal in overcrowded police vans, so that healthy inmates are exposed to tuberculosis.

== Notable inmates ==
- Fabijan Abrantovich, Catholic priest and a pro-independence activist from Belarus
- Anna Abrikosova, nun of the Dominican Order and prominent figure in the Catholic Church in Russia
- Andrei Amalrik, Russian historian and famed dissident during the 1960s; author of "Will the Soviet Union Survive Until 1984"
- Władysław Anders, Polish general and prime minister
- Isaak Babel, writer, killed in 1940
- Aron Baron, Ukrainian anarchist
- Mieczysław Boruta-Spiechowicz, Polish general and one of the leaders of anti-communist opposition in the 1970s
- Alikhan Bukeikhanov, Kazakh statesman
- Walerian Czuma, Polish general
- Felix Dzerzhinsky, Cheka founder
- Vladimir Dzhunkovsky, Russian statesman
- Yuli-Yoel Edelstein, One of the most prominent refuseniks in the Soviet Union who later moved to Israel and became Speaker of the Knesset.
- Blessed Leonid Feodorov, Exarch and reputed bishop of the Russian Greek Catholic Church
- Rashid Khan Gaplanov, Education and Finance Minister of Azerbaijan Democratic Republic
- Yevgenia Ginzburg, author of Journey into the Whirlwind and Within the Whirlwind; mother of the writer Vasili Aksyonov; her books tell of her arrest during the 1937 purges in the city of Kazan, where she worked as a leading member of the local Communist Party structures of Tartary
- Filipp Goloshchyokin, Soviet politician and party leader, was briefly held in Butyrka and sent to Kuibyshev and shot there in October 1941
- Sergey Golovkin, serial killer and the last person to be executed in Russia
- Anatoli Granovsky, NKVD agent and (later) defector
- Dmitry Pavlovich Grigorovich, aircraft designer
- Vladimir Gusinsky, led to the "shares for freedom" transaction or Protocol No.6 (Протокол N.6. Доля свободы) that was signed by Minister for Press, Broadcasting and Mass Communications of the Russian Federation, Mikhail Lesin
- Werner Haase, one of Adolf Hitler's personal physicians, died in captivity in 1950
- Heinz Hitler, German dictator Adolf Hitler's favorite nephew, died after several days of torture in 1942
- Vladimir Ionesyan, spree killer executed in 1964
- Vyacheslav Ivankov, mob boss and thief in law
- Aleksandr Ivanov-Sukharevsky, far right politician and leader of the Peoples National Party (NNP)
- Bruno Jasieński, Polish poet and futurist, killed in 1938
- Elena Karpuchina, the 1967 World Rhythmic Gymnastics Champion, born in 1951 and spent her first two years living in Butyrki until her mother's pardon in 1953
- Aleksandr Kokorin, Russian footballer
- Sergei Korolev, Russian rocket and spacecraft designer
- Walter Linse, German human rights lawyer kidnapped in the American sector of Berlin in July 1952, executed 15 December 1953
- Alexander Litvinenko
- Blessed Zygmunt Łoziński, Catholic bishop of Minsk
- Sergei Magnitsky, lawyer, whose 2009 death in Matrosskaya Tishina Prison led to a 2009 Russian law forbidding jailing of tax criminals and also to the Magnitsky Act being passed by the US Congress in 2012.
- Nestor Makhno, Ukrainian anarchist
- Pavel Mamayev, Russian footballer
- Vladimir Mayakovsky, poet
- Günther Merk, SS-Brigadeführer and war criminal, executed in January 1947
- Leopold Okulicki, Polish general, last commander of the Armia Krajowa, killed in Butyrki in 1946
- Konstantin Päts, president of the Republic of Estonia when it became occupied by the Soviet Union in 1940
- Unto Parvilahti, SS-Officer
- Nikolai Polikarpov, Soviet aeronautical engineer
- Yevgeny Polivanov, Soviet linguist, orientalist and polyglot who was executed in 1938
- Yemelyan Pugachev, pretender to the Russian throne and leader of a Cossack insurrection in 1773–1774
- Iosif Rebelsky, Soviet psychiatrist, psychologist, educator, professor
- Varlam Shalamov, writer and soviet dissident; wrote The Kolyma Tales
- Kazys Skučas, Lithuanian politician and general of the Lithuanian Army
- Aleksandr Solzhenitsyn, Nobel Prize laureate, writer and dissident; wrote The Gulag Archipelago and One Day in the Life of Ivan Denisovich
- Elena Stasova, Russian communist
- Karlo Štajner, Yugoslav communist activist and writer
- Baruch Steinberg, Chief Rabbi of the Polish Army
- Léon Theremin, a pioneer of electronic music, the inventor of the theremin and an electronic eavesdropping bug
- Sergei Tretyakov, Avant-Garde playwright during the 1920s; apparently threw himself down a prison stairwell to avoid execution
- Augustinas Voldemaras, once the prime minister of Lithuania, died in this prison after Lithuania was occupied by the Soviet Union in 1940
- Avgustyn Voloshyn, former president of Carpatho-Ukraine, died in Butyrka in 1945
- Helmuth Weidling, German Wehrmacht general and last commandant of Berlin, died in custody in 1955
- Jonas Žemaitis, Lithuanian general, head of the Lithuanian anti-Soviet partisan forces after World War II, shot to death in 1953; later recognized as the fourth President of Lithuania in 2009
- Abba Gordin, anarchist
