= Hebrew Printing in America =

Hebrew Printing in America, 1735–1926, A History and Annotated Bibliography (ISBN 1-59975-685-4) is a history and bibliography of Hebrew books printed in America between 1735 and 1926 by Yosef Goldman. It records 1208 items, annotated with bibliographical information, historical context, scholarly references, approbations, and location of copies in libraries worldwide. The bibliography is chronologically arranged within broad subject or format (e.g., Bible, liturgy, Haggadah, reference works, education, periodicals, Rabbinica, etc.) with 13 indexes, including Hebrew and English titles and authors, imprint places and years, publishers, printers, approbations, subscribers, typesetters, music arrangers, and artists; as well as reproductions of most title pages and selected interior pages, and appendices containing reproductions of relevant manuscripts and portraits of early American rabbis.

In a review in Judaica Librarianship, Arthur Kiron, Curator of Judaica Collections at the University of Pennsylvania Library, writes that Goldman's bibliography "will remain the standard in the field" (43) and is "a splendid achievement" (45).
