= Julia Danzas =

- Born: 9 May 1879; Athens, Greece
- Died: 13 April 1942 (aged 62); Rome, Italy
- Education: Sorbonne
- Known for: Catholic theologian, writer and Catholic female religious leader
- Awards: Cross of Saint George
- Scientific career
- Fields: History of religion
- Institutions: Russicum

Julia Danzas (9 May 1879 – 13 April 1942) was a Russian historian of religion, a Catholic theologian, writer and a Catholic female religious leader.

== Biography ==
Julia Danzas was the daughter of the Russian chargé d'affaires in Greece, Nikolai Karlovich Danzas. After her father's death in 1888, she moved with her mother to the estate of Danzas in Kharkov Governorate province, then the family moved to Saint Petersburg. After graduating from high school in 1895, Julia Danzas moved to Paris and studied philosophy and psychology at the Sorbonne. In France, she met the leading historians of early Christianity Adolf von Harnack and Abbot L. Dyushenom. Later her circle of acquaintances came to include Orthodox clergymen and sectarians.

Returning to Russia, Danzas collaborated with the newspaper Border regions of Russia, wrote articles for the book Inquiries Thought. These articles she signed with the pseudonym "Yuri Nikolaev." In them, she strongly opposed the socialist ideas against separatism in Finland. In 1907, Empress Alexandra Feodorovna (Alix of Hesse) invited Julia Danzas to work in the Empress' charities. Danzas agreed and became Lady-in-waiting to the Empress.

In 1906, under the pseudonym Yuri Nikolaev, Danzas published her first book, called "The Harrowings of Thought." In 1913, under the same pseudonym, she published the book "In Search of the Divine", the first monograph in Russian about 1st and 2nd centuries Gnosticism. This book stirred the interests of Maxim Gorky, and he became acquainted with Danzas. The range of interests of Danzas (in particular, the interest in Khlysts ) and, possibly, some of the features of her character, were later to be reflected in the character of Marina Zotova, in Gorky's novel The Life of Klim Samgin.

In 1914, at the outbreak of the First World War, the Empress wanted to entrust to Danzas office affairs, but she refused and went to the front. At first, she was in charge of Red Cross Society depots of the 10th Army, and in 1916 was admitted as a volunteer in the 18th Orenburg Cossack Regiment and took part in the fighting. She was awarded the Cross of Saint George.

After the February Revolution, Danzas returned to Petrograd. The interim government proposed to her the command of the Women's Battalion, but she refused. In 1917, Danzas was slated to debate in Saint Petersburg State University Master's degree in world history, but the disputation was not held.

In 1918, Danzas went to work in a public library, where her knowledge of nine languages made her a valuable employee. In addition, she lectured on the history of England and France in the Bekhterev Research Institute and was a member of the Philosophical Society at the University of Petrograd, was one of the organizers of the "Union of Catholic Wisdom", collaborated with the publishing house " World Literature ", and prepared the monograph "Plato". In 1920, Gorky offered her a job at the Vladimir Palace.

At a meeting at the Vladimir Palace Danzas met the head of Russian Catholics, Father Leonid Feodorov. Under his influence, she accepted Catholicism, and with him, in 1921, organized the monastic community of the Holy Spirit, where in 1922 Danzas was received as a nun by the name of Justina. On 11 November 1923, Danzas was arrested, together with other members of the community of Russian Catholics in Petrograd. She was accused of creating a counter-revolutionary organization and without a trial sentenced to 10 years in prison. She was at first imprisoned in the Irkutsk prison, and from September 1928 – in the Solovki prison camp. There, she worked as an accountant and librarian of the "Museum of Local History Society." In September 1932, she was transferred to the camp at the station Bear Mountain, where she worked in the Department of Statistics Construction Management White Sea–Baltic Canal.

In January 1932, at the request of Gorky and of her brother, who lived in Germany, Danzas was released one year in advance. After her release she lived in Leningrad and Moscow, and then, with the assistance of Gorky, in December 1933 emigrated from the Soviet Union. She settled first in Berlin with her brother, then in France, at first at the Monastery of Prull, and then in Lille, where she worked in the Dominican Center for Russian Studies, "Truth." In France, she contributed to the magazine Russie et Chrétienté and wrote a memoir of the Solovetsky camp, published anonymously, as well as books on the history of Russian religious thought, (which attracted a sharp negative review from Nikolai Berdyaev ) and a religious book, Les réminiscences gnostiques dans la philosophie religieuse russe moderne.

In 1940 Danzas moved to Rome, where she lectured at the papal college Russicum. There, in Russian, she published the book Knowledge of God and the Catholic Marxist Atheism (1942) and in Italian a biography of the late Empress Alexandra Feodorovna. She died in Rome on 13 April 1942, shortly before the publication of the latter.

== Bibliography ==
- The Catholic Encyclopedia, Vol 1, ed. Franciscans, Moscow, 2002, pp. 1531–1532, ISBN 978-5-89208-037-8
