= Ivan Deubner =

Ivan Deubner (1873–1936) was a Russian Orthodox priest of German ethnicity who converted to the Russian Catholic Church of Byzantine rite.

In 1903 Deubner was ordained a Russian Catholic priest and celebrated Divine Liturgy underground until 1917 in Saint Petersburg when the Russian Byzantine Rite Catholic Church was legalized temporarily. The Russian Catholic Church had been illegal under the Tsar's Orthodox rule of Russia, but was temporarily legalized under the Mensheviks. The first synod of this church took place and Deubner took part with seven other Ukrainian and Russian Catholic priests of Byzantine roots under the leadership of Ukrainian Metropolitan Andrew Sheptytsky. After legalization, he had a real participation inside of his church until his arrest by the Soviet government in 1923. Father Deubner was killed by a criminal in exile on 12 November 1936.

== See also ==
Alexander Deubner
