= Leonid Feodorov =

Russian Greek Catholic hieromonk and exarch (1879–1935)

Blessed Leonid Feodorov Леонид Фёдоров
- Born: 4 November 1879; Saint Petersburg, Russian Empire
- Died: 7 March 1935 (aged 55); Viatka, Russian SFSR, Soviet Union
- Venerated in: 1. Western (Latin) Catholic Church, 2. Russian Greek Catholic Church
- Beatified: 27 June 2001, Ukraine by Pope John Paul II
- Feast: 7 March

Leonid Ivanovich Feodorov (Russian: Леонид Иванович Фёдоров; 4 November 1879 – 7 March 1935) was a Studite hieromonk from the Russian Greek Catholic Church, the first Exarch of the Russian Catholic Apostolic Exarchate of Russia, and a survivor of the Gulag at Solovki prison camp. He was beatified at Lviv by Pope John Paul II on 27 June 2001.

== Early life ==
Feodorov was born in Saint Petersburg, Russia, on 4 November 1879, into a Russian Orthodox family. His father, Ivan Feodorovich Feodorov, was the son of a former State serf from Yaroslavl Governorate and had become the owner of the Malii Yaroslaviets, a highly successful St. Petersburg restaurant, which was one of the centers of the Imperial capital's artistic, literary, and intellectual ferment during the Silver Age. The restaurant's regular patrons included poet and philosopher Vladimir Soloviev and a young Joseph Stalin, who, according to Simon Sebag Montefiore, more than once braved the risk of arrest during Tsarist secret police manhunts out of a longing to eat at his "favorite hangout" of "Fedorov's restaurant."

Leonid's mother, Lyubov Feodorov, a woman of Greek descent, raised him as a single mother after his father's early death. Lubov Feodorov used her husband's legacy of 15,000 rubles to send her son, out of a desire for him to move up in the world, to the First Imperial Gymnasium, where he was educated alongside the sons of the Russian nobility. Although she also attempted to raise her son as a devout member of the Russian Orthodox Church, she simultaneously encouraged him to read the popular novelists of the day.

He later recalled, "So I began to devour the best known French novelists of the day, Zola, Hugo, Maupassant, and Dumas. I became acquainted with the Italian Renaissance and its corrupt literature, Boccaccio and Ariosto. My head came to be like a sewer into which the foulest muck was emptied."

While attending the Second Imperial Gymnasium in St. Petersburg, Feodorov considered himself, after reading sacred texts of both Hinduism and Buddhism, to be a Nihilist. He often used to quote William Wordsworth's maxim, "War is the daughter of God", and intended following his graduation to become an officer in the Imperial Russian Army.

Under the influence of the Gymnasium's Orthodox chaplain and teacher of religion, Fr. Konstantin (Smirnov), whom Father Paul Mailleux has termed, "one of the most remarkable Russian Orthodox priests of his time", Feodorov underwent a religious conversion and instead decided to study for the Orthodox priesthood.

After his graduation from the Gymnasium in 1901, he enrolled in the Saint Petersburg Theological Academy in order to study for the priesthood in the Russian Orthodox Church. The Ecclesiastical Academy, however, was largely focused towards training civil service officials rather than priests, and Feodorov accordingly found it a great disappointment.

During a crisis of Faith, Feodorov came to believe, "through the reading of the Fathers and of history", that the Roman Catholic Church is the one true church, "at a time when I was losing my faith". In response, he began discreetly attending the Tridentine Mass at St. Catherine's Church on Nevsky Prospect. At the Ecclesiastical Academy, his teachers took to calling Feodorov, "our Catholic."

After much soul-searching, Feodorv decided to leave his studies in the summer of 1902 and travel to Rome in order to convert to the Roman Catholic Church. In order to interrupt his studies and be granted a passport necessary for foreign travel, Feodorov needed the permission of the Academy Inspector, Archimandrite Theofan (Bystrov), who responded, "I know very well why you wish to go to Italy... So be it, and may God keep you." Fr. Cyril Korolevsky alleges that Archimandrite Theofan, "was quite convinced of the truth of Catholicism, but like a number of others he could not bring himself to take the definite step." In reality, Archimandrite Theofan remained Orthodox even after the October Revolution, when he become a refugee from the Red Terror in Bulgaria and France.

Leonid Feodorov and his Catholic spiritual mentor, Fr. Jan Szyslawski, traveled to Rome by way of Austrian-ruled Lviv, where Metropolitan Andrey Sheptytsky of the Ukrainian Greek Catholic Church blessed his mission.

== Conversion and ordination ==
On 31 July 1902, Feodorov was formally received into the Catholic Church at the Church of the Gesù in Rome. In the aftermath, he began studying at the Jesuit seminary at Anagni under the pseudonym of "Leonidas Pierre," which was meant to keep the Tsar's secret police, or Okhrana, off his trail. In a conversation with a fellow seminarian at Agnani, Feodorov predicted, "Russia will not repent without travelling the Red Sea of the blood of her martyrs and numerous sufferings of her apostles."

Although Leonid had originally promised to adopt the Latin Rite, while studying in the Collegio Leoniano, a Jesuit major seminary at Anagni, Leonid became aware that the Pope wished instead for him to remain faithful to the liturgy and customs of the Christian East. With the full permission and encouragement of Pope Pius X, Leonid transferred to the Russian Byzantine Catholic Church. This decision caused a rift between Leonid and his Jesuit mentor, and afterwards he depended for his finances on Metropolitan Andrei Sheptytsky of Lviv.

On March 25, 1911, he received ordination as a Byzantine Rite priest by Metropolitan Michael Mirov in Holy Trinity parish of the Bulgarian Greek Catholic Church in the Galata neighborhood of Constantinople. He spent the following years as a hieromonk of the Ukrainian Studite Monks at Kamenica (existing 1908–1924), near Čelinac in Bosnia and Herzegovina, where his spiritual formation was supervised by a Greek Catholic Starets named "Elder Josaphat. Brother Leonid was tonsured with monastic name 'Leontiy' on 12 March 1913.

== Return to Russia ==
On the eve of the First World War, he returned to Saint Petersburg whereupon he was immediately exiled to Tobolsk in Siberia as a potential threat to the Tsar's government which held Russian Orthodoxy as its state religion.

After the February Revolution, the Provisional Government ordered the release of all political prisoners. A three-day Synod of the Russian Byzantine Catholic Church opened in Saint Petersburg under the leadership of Metropolitan Andrey, who, at the end of the Synod, named Feodorov Exarch of the Russian Catholics. Once Fr. Cyril Korolevsky successfully proved to the Holy See that Metropolitan Andrey had simply made use of his rights as defined by Pope Pius X, Feodorov's position as Exarch was confirmed by Pope Benedict XV.

He served as abbot in the Church of the Descent of the Holy Spirit in Petrograd, under his leadership the women's order of the Holy Family, the Community of Sisters of the Holy Spirit, and the Society of John Chrysostom were founded. He made presentations, participated in discussions with Orthodox clergy, including Patriarch Tikhon of Moscow and Metropolitan Benjamin of Petrograd. At the time, Patriarch Tikhon was faced with the ongoing Soviet-backed Living Church Schism and was determined defend the hard-won independence of the Moscow Patriarchate from again being lost to control by the State. For this reason, Patriarch Tikhon was both meeting regularly to discuss possible reunion with both the Exarch and with Father Vladimir Abrikosov. The Patriarch was also urging those Orthodox clergy and laity who remained loyal to him to similarly meet with the Russian Catholics in order to discuss the possible reunion of the Russian Orthodox Church with the Holy See under the terms laid down at the Council of Florence in 1439.

This was why, when Fr. Edmund A. Walsh, the head of the American and Papal relief missions during the Russian famine of 1921, and the Exarch of the Russian Greek Catholic Church first met one another and conversed in Ecclesiastical Latin, Feodorov, who admired Patriarch Tikhon and felt only contempt for the so-called Living Church, urged that the Famine Relief food supplies be entrusted to not only to Catholic clergy, but also to those Russian Orthodox priests who remained loyal to Patriarch Tikhon for distribution to the starving. Fr. Walsh enthusiastically agreed with the Exarch's idea and ensured that it was carried out. In Orenburg alone, his assistant, Fr. Louis J. Gallagher hosted six local Russian Orthodox bishops to his table to organize the delivery of food supplies to the starving.

Meanwhile, according to historian Edward E. Roslof, to a much greater extent than the Rurikid and Romanov Tsars before them, the Soviet State and it's secret police, the GPU, had no intention of tolerating the possible reunion of East and West, and were especially determined to snuff out all efforts to preserve the continued independence of the Russian Orthodox Church from the State's power and control.

Open persecution of religion began in 1922. The clergy were forbidden to preach religion to anyone under eighteen years of age. Then, during the Russian famine of 1921, all sacred objects were ordered to be seized for "famine relief" and lay councils called dvatsatkii were installed in each parish by the GPU with the intention of making the priest a mere employee. When both the Exarch Leonid and the Latin Rite Archbishop Jan Cieplak refused to permit this, all Catholic parishes were forcibly closed by the State.

== The Cieplak Trial ==
In the spring of 1923, Exarch Leonid, Archbishop Cieplak, Monsignor Konstanty Budkiewicz, and fourteen other Catholic priests and one layman were summoned to a Moscow trial before the revolutionary tribunal for counter-revolutionary activities and anti-Soviet agitation.

According to Father Christopher L. Zugger,

The Bolsheviks had already orchestrated several 'show trials.' The Cheka had staged the 'Trial of the St. Petersburg Combat Organization'; its successor, the new GPU, the 'Trial of the Socialist Revolutionaries.' In these and other such farces, defendants were inevitably sentenced to death or to long prison terms in the north. The Cieplak show trial is a prime example of Bolshevik revolutionary justice at this time. Normal judicial procedures did not restrict revolutionary tribunals at all; in fact, the prosecutor N.V. Krylenko, stated that the courts could trample upon the rights of classes other than the proletariat. Appeals from the courts went not to a higher court, but to political committees. Western observers found the setting -- the grand ballroom of a former Noblemen's Club, with painted cherubs on the ceiling -- singularly inappropriate for such a solemn event. Neither judges nor prosecutors were required to have a legal background, only a proper 'revolutionary' one. That the prominent 'No Smoking' signs were ignored by the judges themselves did not bode well for legalities."

New York Herald correspondent Francis McCullagh, who was present at the trial, later described its fourth day as follows:

Krylenko, who began to speak at 6:10 PM, was moderate enough at first, but quickly launched into an attack on religion in general and the Catholic Church in particular. "The Catholic Church", he declared, "has always exploited the working classes." When he demanded the Archbishop's death, he said, "All the Jesuitical duplicity with which you have defended yourself will not save you from the death penalty. No Pope in the Vatican can save you now." ...As the long oration proceeded, the Red Procurator worked himself into a fury of anti-religious hatred. "Your religion", he yelled, "I spit on it, as I do on all religions, -- on Orthodox, Jewish, Mohammedan, and the rest." "There is no law here but Soviet Law," he yelled at another stage, "and by that law you must die."

Unlike the other defendants, Exarch Leonid insisted on acting as his own attorney, which led to some of the most dramatic moments of the trial. According to Zugger,

Dressed in the traditional Russian black cassock, with his long hair and beard often described as 'Christ-like', Feodorov was a man of the narod, of the ordinary Russian people for whom the Revolution had been fought. His presence put the lie to the usual description of Catholicism as 'the Polish religion.' His presentation -- a moving testimony of Russian spirituality and the history of the Church in that country -- evoked the best of Russian Christendom. He pointed out that Greek-Catholics greeted the Revolution with joy, for only then did they have equality. There was no secret organization, they had simply followed Church law. Religious education, the celebration of Mass, and the administration of the Sacraments of marriage and baptism had to be fulfilled. He pointed out that the Church, accused of having neglected the starving, was at that moment feeding 120,000 children daily. Following a scathing rebuttal by Krylenko, Exarch Feodorov rose for his final remarks: "Our hearts are full, not of hatred, but of sadness. You cannot understand us, we are not allowed liberty of conscience. That is the only conclusion we can draw from what we have heard here."

With the verdict and sentences already decided upon in advance, Archbishop Cieplak and Monsignor Budkiewicz were both sentenced to death. Exarch Leonid and all the other defendants were sentenced to the term of ten years imprisonment.

== The Gulag ==
The international uproar which followed the trial gave the Soviet government pause, however. In 1926, after serving the first three years of his sentence in Moscow's Butyrka prison, Exarch Leonid was transported to Solovki prison camp, located in a former island monastery in the White Sea.

During a conversation inside the anti-religious museum at Solovki with fellow Russian Greek Catholic political prisoner Julia Danzas, the Exarch revealed that felt profoundly moved to be incarcerated in the former monastery complex once led by St. Philip of Moscow. The Exarch also reverently kissed both the vestments once used by the former Hegumen and the stone which St. Philip had once used instead of a pillow. The Exarch commented, "On this stone, the Saint had not only radiant visions, but how many bitter tears did he shed!"

When Danzas described her own recent struggles inside the Irkutsk labor camp against spiritual despondency and doubt, the Exarch advised her, "That is well. The Lord will sustain you, but if ever the moment returns when you no longer feel this support, don't be frightened. The Lord's aid is perhaps precisely the most abundant when it seems that He has forsaken us."

During a later conversation, the Exarch confided in Danzas, "The true Messianism of the Russian Church is not what the Slavophiles have imagined, but it is the example of suffering. It is in this way that she shows that she is the continuation of Christ in this world."

According to Deacon Vasili von Burman, "At that time, when the camp seemed a spiritual desert, a place of depression and even despair, the Catholic priests led a fruitful life in their closed circle... Observing them, one could not help but comprehend what an important part religion played in people's lives; how it inspired them. In the context of existence on Solovki this stood out with particular clarity... On Sundays and Feast Days, services were held in the Germanovsky chapel and it was, for all its poverty, a place of celebration."

In response, however, to escalating diplomatic protests and publicity given to religious persecution in the USSR by the Holy See, the Chekist guards on Solovki cracked down on the Catholic prisoners with a vengeance. Beginning on January 19, 1929, the use of the Germanovsky chapel for religious services was forbidden, all religious books and artifacts were confiscated from Catholic prisoners, and the Catholics of Solovki were reduced to what Irina Osipova was termed, "a catacomb existence".

== Release and death ==
On 6 August 1929, Exarch Leonid was released to the town of Pinega in the Arkhangelsk Oblast and put to work making charcoal. After continuing to teach the Catechism to young boys, he was transferred to the village of Poltava, 15 km from Kotlas (not to be confused with the city of Poltava, Ukraine), where he completed his sentence in 1932. He chose to reside in Viatka, where, worn out by the rigours of his imprisonment, he died on 7 March 1935.

== Legacy ==
Following his return to the United States following the 1923 Cieplak show trial, Fr Edmund A. Walsh commissioned a painting of Exarch Leonid from Russian refugee artist Paul Maltzev. The painting was based on a photograph taken of the Exarch as a political prisoner at Solovki concentration camp, located above the Arctic Circle. The painting hung in Fr. Walsh's office at Georgetown University for the rest of his life and he always spoke of the first Exarch of the Russian Greek Catholic Church with a deep sense of reverence.

Metropolitan Andrey Sheptytsky of the Ukrainian Greek Catholic Church said, "We expect that the exarch [Leonid Feodoriv] is on the road to glorification through beatification. Of course, it is much too early to talk about this, but all of us were strongly impressed by his holiness, strengthened by the crown of martyrdom and death; this certainly supports our expectations. On the other hand, as a Russian Catholic, as exarch, as someone who died at the hands of the Bolsheviks, it seems to us that he will be right in the center of attention of the entire Church."

On 1 October 1990, the Supreme Soviet of the Soviet Union passed a decree formally repudiating traditional Marxist-Leninist anti-religious policy and granting religious freedom, the equality of all religious denominations before the law, and the religious education of children to all Soviet citizens without exception.

On 27 June 2001, Exarch Leonid Feodorov was beatified during a Byzantine Rite Divine Liturgy in Lviv, Ukraine by Pope John Paul II. He remains deeply venerated among Russian Catholics and was highly praised by James Likoudis, a convert from Greek Orthodoxy to the Greek Byzantine Catholic Church, in his 2016 book, Heralds of a Catholic Russia: Twelve Spiritual Pilgrims from Byzantium to Rome.

== See also ==
Catholic Church titles
Preceded by established	Exarch of Russian Byzantine Catholic Church; 1917–1935	Succeeded by Klymentiy Sheptytsky
