= Semyon Firin =

Soviet security officer and Gulag commander

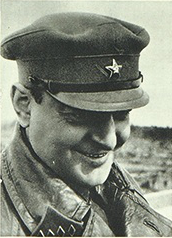
- Semyon Firin
- Born: Semyon Grigoryevich Pupko; June 30, 1898; Vilnius, Vilna Governorate, Russian Empire
- Died: August 14, 1937 (aged 39); Moscow, Soviet Union
- Political party: Communist Party of the Soviet Union

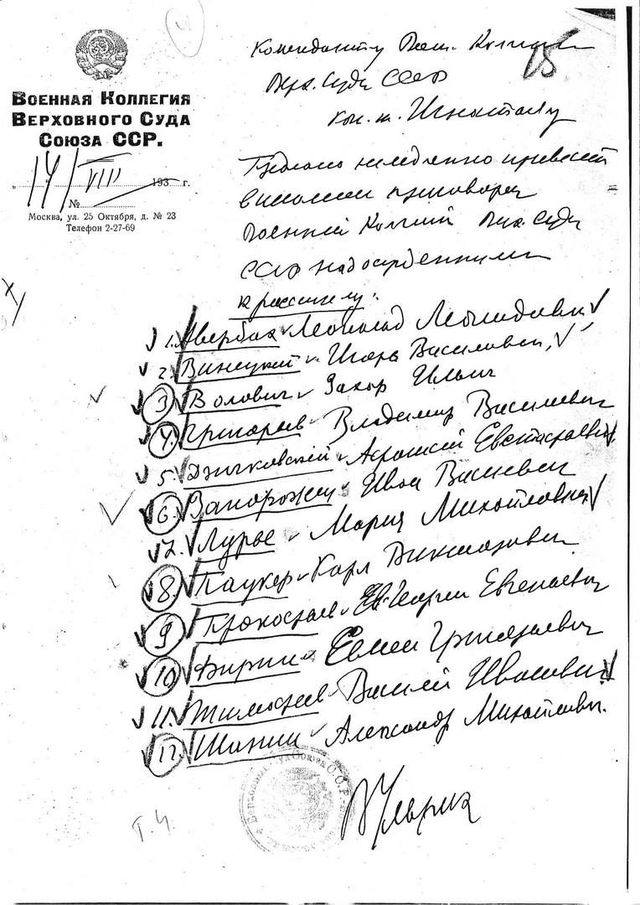
Order of Vasily Ulrich on the immediate execution of 12 people convicted by the Military Collegium of the Supreme Court of the USSR. Firin is number 10

Semyon Grigoryevich Firin (Russian: Семён Григо́рьевич Фи́рин; June 30, 1898 – August 14, 1937) was a Soviet officer in the intelligence services OGPU and NKVD. Later in his career, he was a leader in different Gulag forced labor camps, named by Alexsandr Solzhenitsyn as one of "the main henchmen of Stalin and Yagoda, the main overseers of the Belomor, six hired killers" responsible for the deaths of tens of thousands of people in the construction of the White Sea–Baltic Canal. He was executed during the Great Purge in 1937.

== Early life ==
Firin was born to a poor Jewish family. His original surname was Pupko.

He worked at a factory in Vitebsk. During World War I he was drafted into the army but deserted.

== Revolutionary career ==
In 1917 he took part in revolutionary events in Petrograd and Moscow. Drafted into the army, he deserted again after being sent to the front in the third special division. Engaged in political activities. In 1918 he joined the Bolsheviks.

During the Civil War, he led partisan sabotage units in Lithuania, then was transferred to the intelligence department of the headquarters of the Western Front, where his duties included the organization of partisan-sabotage detachments behind enemy lines.

== Service within OGPU ==
For a number of years following the end of the Civil War he worked in the intelligence services of the Red Army abroad (Greece, Turkey, Bulgaria, Yugoslavia), then transferred to work in the OGPU, where from 1930 he was deputy head of the Special Department.

He became the deputy chief of the White Sea–Baltic Canal forced labor camp under the supervision of Matvei Berman in 1932. He was awarded the Order of Lenin for his participation in the management of the construction of the canal in 1933. Aleksandr Solzhenitsyn named Semyon Firin as one of the six supervisors responsible for 30,000 deaths during the construction of the canal in his book The Gulag Archipelago.

After the White Sea–Baltic Canal was finished, he became the leading NKVD official alongside Sergey Zhuk and Lazar Kogan in the Dmitlag forced labor camp based in Dmitrov where the inmates were building the Moscow Canal. In August 1933, Firin was upset that there were too many frail workers who were not meeting production goals. He ordered the camp leaders to cut their food rations as a punishment which meant they only got weaker and thus were "unloaded".

Firin was arrested for allegedly participating in an Operational-Chekist coup to prepare a "palace revolution" on 28 April 1937. He was executed by a firing squad on 14 August 1937.

== Family ==
His wife, Zofia Zaleska, was born to a Polish family in 1903 in Śmiłowice, Włocławek County. She had participated in the November Revolution in Germany before graduating from high school in 1920. She became a member of the Bolsheviks in 1920, then went on to work for the Intelligence Directorate of the Red Army as a political instructor, where she was awarded the Order of the Red Banner.

She was arrested on May 26, 1937, included in the execution list of August 20, 1937 and shot on August 22, 1937. She was rehabilitated posthumously on September 14, 1957.
