= Lazar Kogan =

NKVD officer

- Лазарь Коган

Head of the Gulag
- In office 16 June 1930 – 9 June 1932
- Preceded by: Fedor Ivanovich Eichmans
- Succeeded by: Matvey Davydovich Berman

Personal details
- Born: November 7, 1889 Elovka, Krasnoyarsk Krai, Yeniseysk Governorate, Russian Empire
- Died: 3 March 1939 (aged 49) Kommunarka shooting ground, Kommunarka, Moscow Oblast, Soviet Union
- Cause of death: Execution
- Citizenship: Soviet Union
- Party: Communist Party of the Soviet Union (1918–1938)
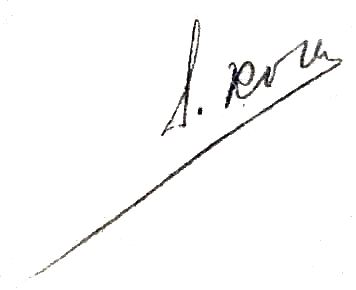
- Signature

Lazar Iosifovich Kogan (Russian: Ла́зарь Ио́сифович Ко́ган; November 7, 1889 – March 3, 1939) was a Soviet secret police (Cheka, OGPU, NKVD) high-ranking functionary, chief of the Gulag (1930–1932) and deputy chief of the Gulag (1932–1936).

== Biography ==
Born in Elovka, Krasnoyarsk Krai, in the Yeniseysk Governorate of the Russian Empire, he was the son of a wealthy Jewish merchant. His father was a fur trader. An active participant in the revolutionary movement, at first, an anarcho-communist. In 1908, a Kiev Military District court sentenced him to death for participating in looting with a gun in his hand. This punishment was then converted into a life sentence.

Kogan joined the Russian Communist Party (b) in 1918.

His major positions include chief of the GULAG (1930–1932), deputy chief of the GULAG (1932–1936), deputy Narkom of Forest Industry (1936–1937).

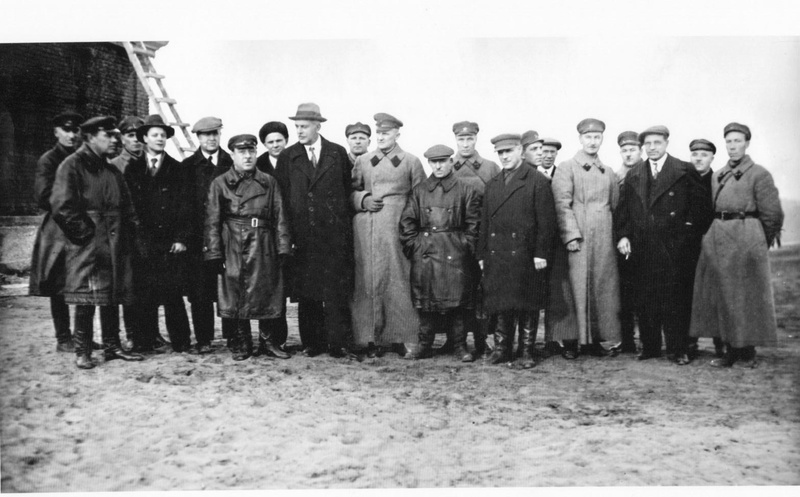
Commission at the building zone of the Moscow Canal; Kogan is sixth from left

Until August 1936, Kogan was the head of the construction of the Belomorsk Baltic Canal. Measuring 227 kilometres (141 miles) and connecting the Baltic Sea with the White Sea, the canal was built in 20 months by 170,000 Gulag prisoners. Kogan was a member of the Central Executive Committee of the Soviet Union from 1935 to 1937.

He is mentioned from this period by Aleksandr Solzhenitsyn in The Gulag Archipelago: "It is time to put six names on the slopes of this channel – the main helpers of Stalin and Yagoda, the main supervisors of Belomor canal, six mercenary killers, after each of them thirty thousand deaths victims: Firin – Berman – Frenkel – Kogan – Rappoport – Zhuk".

Kogan was arrested on 31 January 1938. While imprisoned, he wrote several repentance letters to Nikolay Yezhov, then to Lavrentiy Beria. He was nonetheless sentenced to death and shot on 3 March 1939 at the NKVD's Kommunarka shooting ground. He was rehabilitated in 1956.

== Awards ==
- Order of Lenin (1933)
- Order of the Red Banner
