= Goricheva =

Goricheva (Russian: Горичева) is a Russian feminine surname. Notable people with the name include:

- Karina Goricheva (born 1993), Kazakh weightlifter
- Mariya Goricheva (1887–1967), Russian Empire and Soviet film actress
- Tatiana Goricheva (1947–2025), Russian philosopher, theologian, dissident, and feminist
