= Pliner =

Pliner is a Yiddish surname. Either a toponymic surname meaning "someone from Plino", or a variant of Pleiner. Notable people with the surname include:

- Edouard Pliner, Russian figure skating coach
- Israel Pliner, Soviet NKVD officer
- Yakov Pliner, Latvian politician
