= White Sea–Baltic Canal =

Ship canal in Russia

Coordinates: 62°48′N 34°48′E

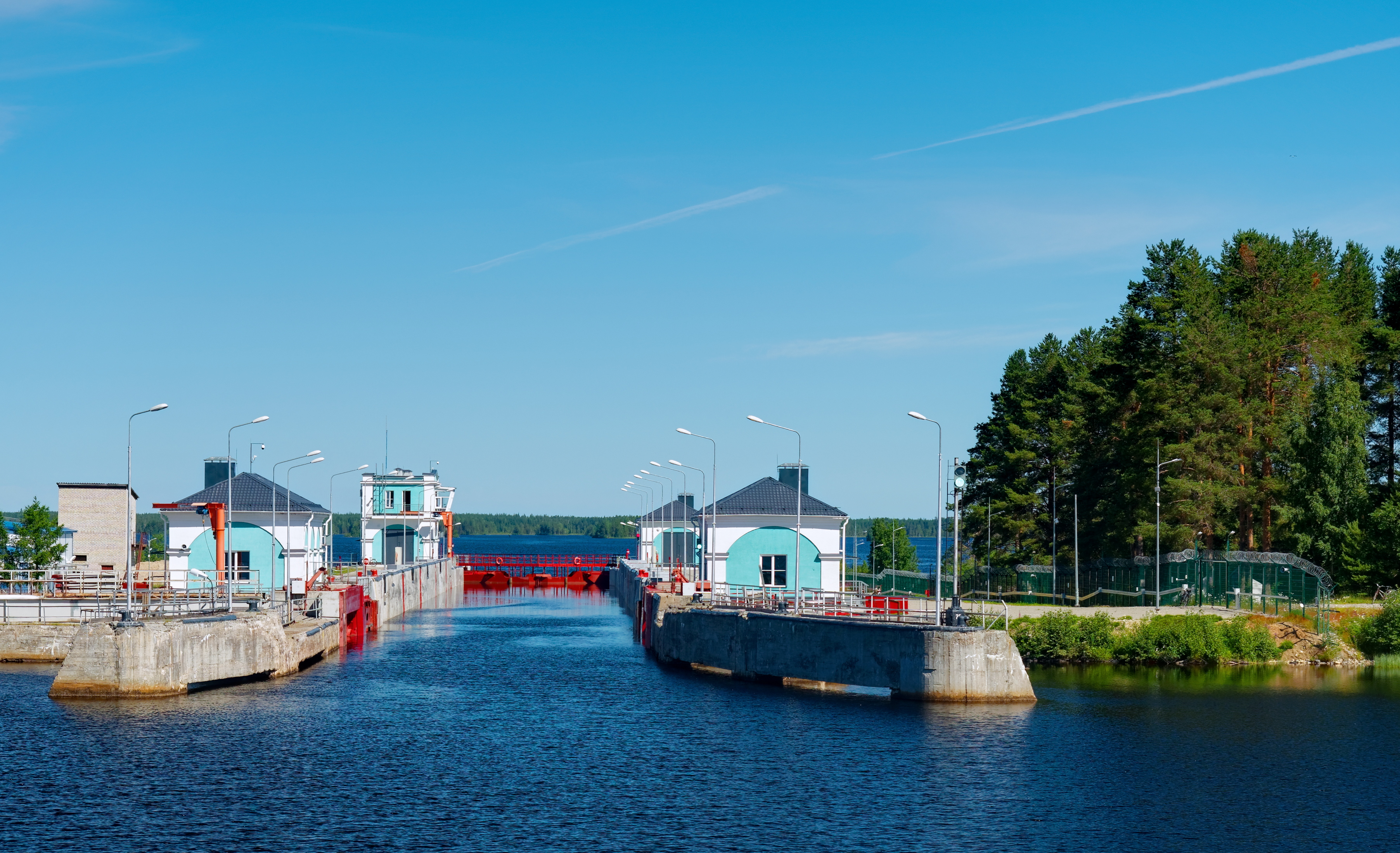

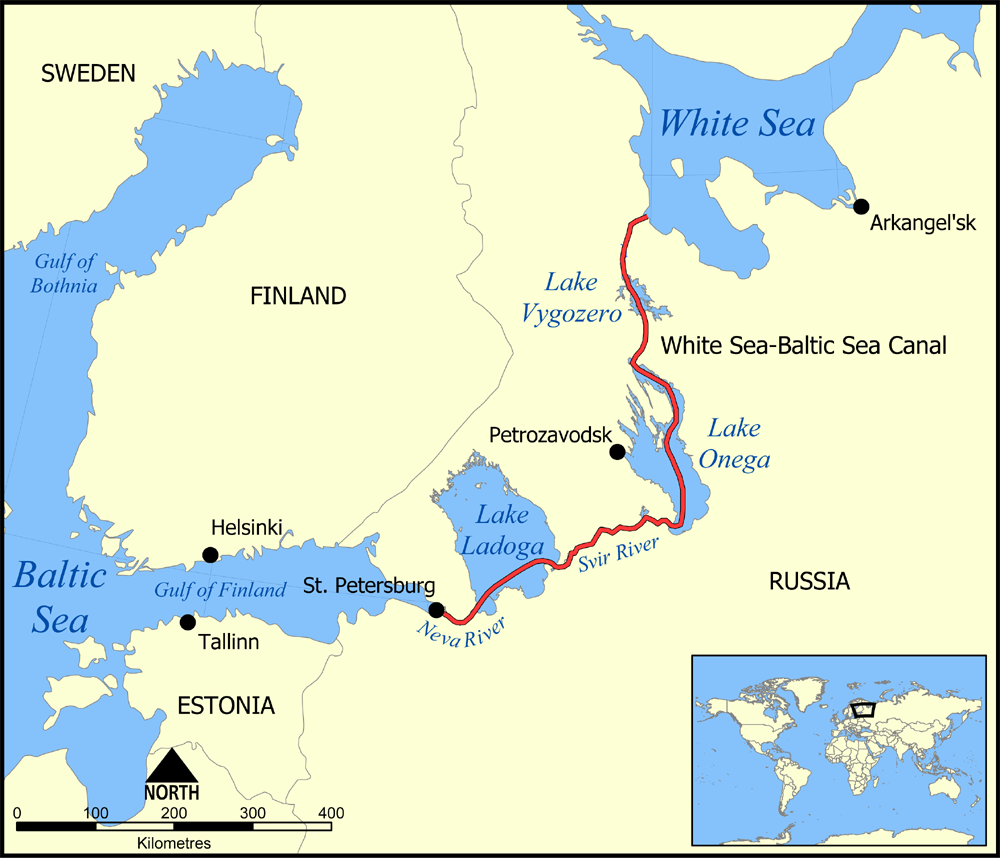
- White Sea Canal map
- Interactive map of White Sea–Baltic Canal

Specifications
- Length: 141 miles (227 km)
- Maximum boat length: 443 ft 0 in (135.0 m)
- Maximum boat beam: 47 ft 0 in (14.3 m)
- Maximum boat draft: 4 m
- Locks: 19
- Maximum height AMSL: 334 ft (102 m)
- Status: Open

History
- Construction began: 1931
- Date of first use: 2 August 1933
- Date completed: 1933

Geography
- Start point: Lake Onega, Russia
- End point: White Sea in Belomorsk, Russia

The White Sea–Baltic Canal (Russian: Беломо́рско-Балти́йский кана́л, romanized: Belomórsko-Baltíyskiy kanál), often abbreviated to White Sea Canal (Belomorkanal), is a man-made ship canal in Russia. Opening on 2 August 1933, it connects the White Sea, in the Arctic Ocean, with Lake Onega, which is further connected to the Baltic Sea. Until 1961, it was called by its original name: the Stalin White Sea–Baltic Canal (Belomorsko-Baltiyskiy Kanal imeni Stalina).

The canal was constructed by forced labor of gulag inmates. Beginning and ending with a labor force of 126,000, between 12,000 and 25,000 laborers died according to official records, while journalist Anne Applebaum's estimate is 25,000 deaths.

The canal runs 227 km (141 mi), partially along several canalized rivers and Lake Vygozero. As of 2008, it carries only light traffic of between ten to forty boats per day. Its economic advantages are limited by its minimal depth of 3.5 m (11.5 ft), inadequate for most seagoing vessels. This depth typically corresponds to river craft with deadweight cargo up to 600 tonnes, while useful seagoing vessels of 2,000–3,000 dwt typically have drafts of 4.5–6 m (15–20 ft). The canal was originally proposed to be 5.4 m (17.7 ft) deep; however, the cost and time constraints of Stalin's first five-year plan forced the much shallower draught.

== Waterway ==
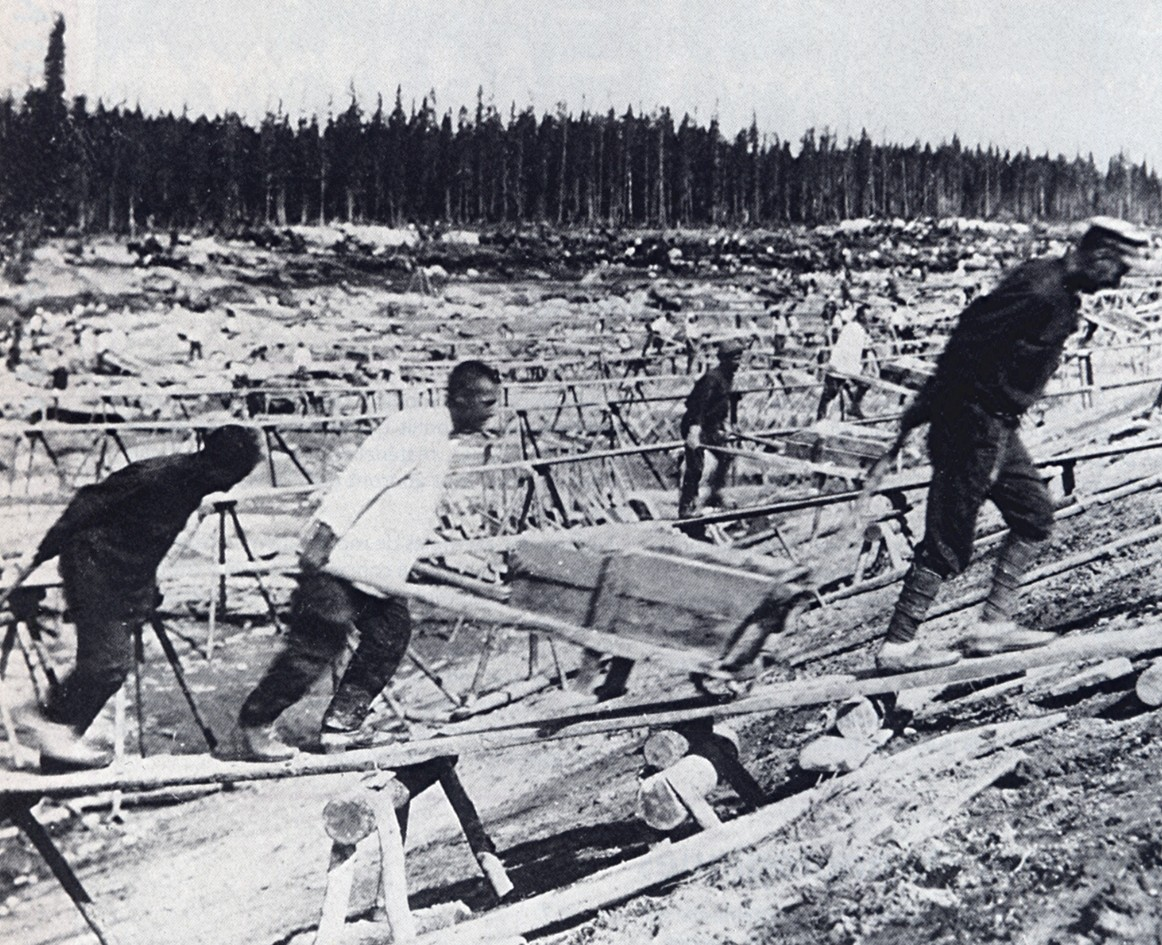
Prisoners at work, 1932

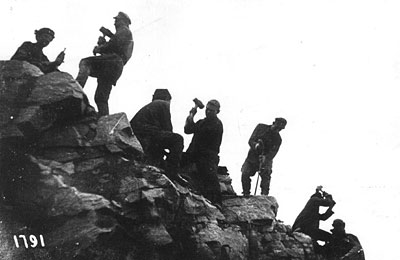
The prisoners' labour at the Belomorkanal construction site

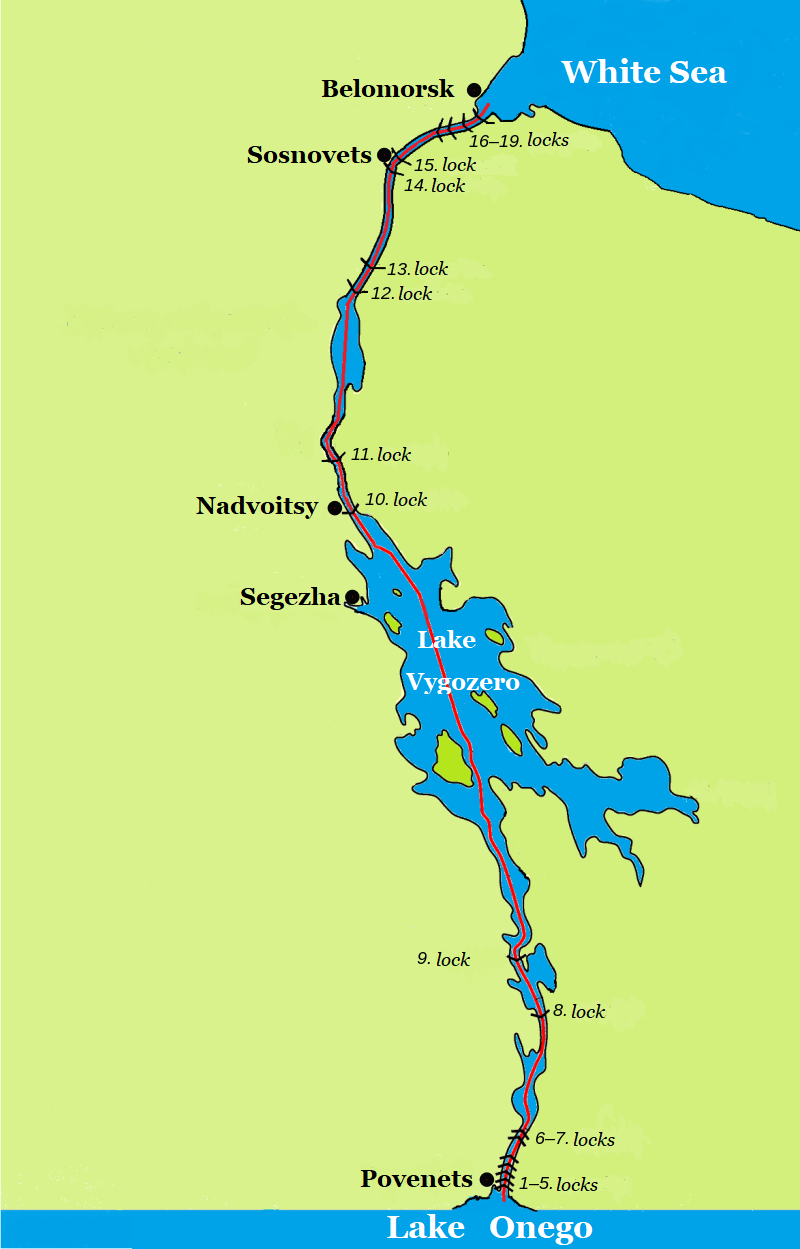
Canal Route

The total length of the waterway is 227 km (141 mi), of which 48 km (30 mi) are man-made. The current flows north from Lake Onega to the White Sea, and all navigation marks are set according to it. Once in Lake Onega, ships can exit the southwest shore through the Svir River (and its two locks) to reach Lake Ladoga and then proceed down the Neva River to Saint Petersburg and the Baltic Sea. Alternatively, from Lake Onega river ships can sail eastward into the Volga–Baltic Waterway.

=== Route ===
The canal begins near Povenets settlement in Povenets bay of Lake Onega. After Povenets there are seven locks close together, forming the "Stairs of Povenets". These locks are the southern slope of the canal. The canal summit pound at 103 metres (338 feet) elevation is 22 km (14 mi) long between locks 7 & 8. The northern slope has twelve locks numbered 8–19. The route of the northern slope runs through five large lakes; Lake Matkozero between locks 8 & 9, Lake Vygozero between locks 9 & 10, Lake Palagorka between locks 10 & 11, Lake Voitskoye between locks 11 & 12 and Lake Matkozhnya between locks 13 & 14. The canal empties out into the Soroka Bay of the White Sea at Belomorsk. The settlements of Povenets, Segezha, Nadvoitsy, Sosnovets, and Belomorsk are located along the canal.

=== Sailing conditions ===
Minimum lock dimensions are 14.3 m (47 ft) wide by 135 m (443 ft) long. The navigable channel is 36 m (118 ft) wide and 3.5 m (11.5 ft) deep, with a radius of curvature of 500 m (1,640 ft). Speed is limited to 8 km/h (4.3 kn; 5.0 mph) in all artificial portions. In conditions of low visibility (less than one km) navigation is halted.

For the navigation seasons of 2008 to 2010, the canal locks were scheduled to operate from 20 May to 15–30 October, giving 148–163 navigation days per year.

=== Profile ===
The following illustration depicts the profile of the White Sea–Baltic Canal. The horizontal axis is the length of the canal. The vertical axis is the elevation of the canal segments above mean sea level, showing the summit level of 100 metres (300 feet) between Lakes Onego and Vygozero.

Profile of the canal showing the locks and elevation

== Construction ==
The Soviet Union presented the canal as an example of the success of the first five-year plan. Its construction was completed four months ahead of schedule, though it was too shallow for the planned use. The canal was constructed in twenty months, between 1931 and 1933, almost entirely by manual labor.

The canal was the first major project constructed in the Soviet Union using forced labor. Belbaltlag, the Directorate of the BBK Camps, managed the construction, supplying a workforce of an estimated 100,000 convicts, at the cost of huge casualties. Although prison labor camps were usually kept secret, the White Sea Canal was a propaganda showcase of convicts "reforging" themselves in useful labor (Soviet concept of perekovka, reforging or rehabilitation).

Marshall Berman states that "The canal was a triumph of publicity; but if half the care that went into the public relations campaign had been devoted to the work itself, there would have been far fewer victims and far more development."

=== Organization and management ===
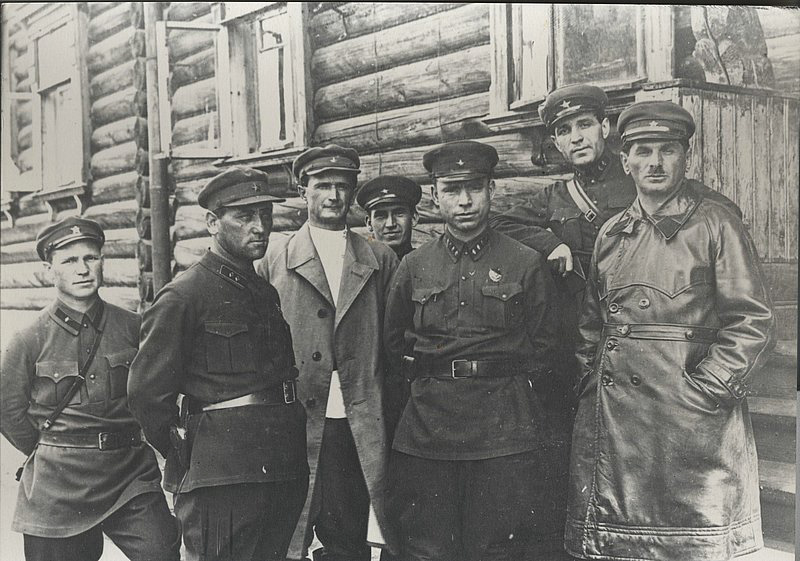
Chief of works Naftaly Frenkel (rightmost), head of GULAG Matvei Berman (center), chief of the southern part of the canal Afanasyev (second from left)

The workforce for the Canal was supplied by the Belbaltlag camp directorate (White Sea–Baltic Corrective Labor Camp Directorate, WSBC) of the OGPU GULAG.

- Genrikh Yagoda, Deputy Chairman of the OGPU and later Director of the NKVD
- P. F. Aleksandrov (П. Ф. Александров), acting chief of WSBC, January 16, 1932, full chief from March 28, 1932, to at least January 15, 1933
- Matvei Berman, head of the Gulag during most of the 1930s, direct supervisor of Firin
- Semyon Firin, Chief of Construction, also mentioned in 1933 documents as chief of WSBC
- Naftaly Frenkel, Chief of Works, November 16, 1931, to the end of construction.
- Lazar Kogan, chief of the BBK Construction Directorate
- Yakov D. Rapoport, deputy chief of the BBK Construction Directorate
- Edward I. Senkevich, chief of WSBC, November 16, 1931 – January 16, 1932, also assistant chief of the BBK Construction Directorate

Yagoda, as well as Berman, Firin, Frenkel, Kogan, and Rapoport were awarded the Order of Lenin for the completion of the canal by the Politburo on July 15, 1933.

=== Working conditions ===
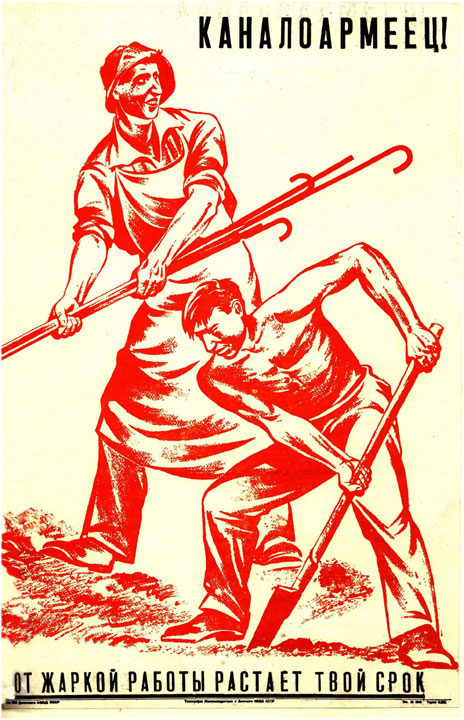
Agitprop propaganda poster used to motivate convict laborers during the construction. The writing says: 'Canal Army soldier! The heat of your work will melt your prison term!'

The Soviets portrayed the project as evidence of the efficiency of the Gulag. Supposedly "reforging class enemies" (political prisoners) through "corrective labor", the working conditions at the BBK Camp were brutal, with the prisoners given only primitive hand tools to carry out the massive construction project. The mortality rate was about 8.7%, with many more sick and disabled.

The workforce was organized into brigades of 25–30, which made up phalanges of 250–300. There were norms for labor, for example 2.5 m^{3} (3.3 cu yd) of hand-dug stone per day per brigade. There was an extensive system of incentives for prisoners in place. The food rations for prisoners who exceeded quotas were increased; Those who fulfilled and exceeded the norm (2.5 m³; 3.3 sq. yd. per day for earthworks) received an increased bread ration (up to 1200 g; 2 lb 10 oz), a bonus dish (for example, 75-gram; 3 oz pies with cabbage or potatoes), and a cash bonus. Moral incentives were also used: presenting the brigade or phalange with a Red Banner, declaring gratitude, presenting certificates, placing the names of shock workers on the honor board, as well as counting 3 working days for 5 days of work, and for shock workers - "a day in two". At other times these teams were pitted to compete against each other in surpassing the norms, and promises were made of shortened sentences, food and cash bonuses for the champions. After the successful construction, 12,484 prisoners were freed as reward, and 59,516 prison terms were shortened. 12,300 workers died during the building process, according to the official records, including in 1931 - 1438 (2.24% of the number of workers), in 1932 - 2010 (2.03%), in 1933 - 8870 (10.56%), which was due to a reduction in supplies due to famine in the country and the rush before the completion of construction while Anne Applebaum's estimate is 25,000 deaths.

=== The canal and Russian writers ===
A carefully prepared visit in August 1933 to the White Sea–Baltic Canal may have hidden the worst of the brutality from a group of 120 Russian writers and artists, the so-called Writers Brigade, including Maxim Gorky, Aleksey Nikolayevich Tolstoy, Viktor Shklovsky, and Mikhail Zoshchenko, who compiled a work in praise of the project, the 600-page The I.V. Stalin White Sea – Baltic Sea Canal (Беломорско-Балтийский канал имени Сталина), published at the end of 1934. Shklovsky visited the White Sea Canal on his own rather than with the group. Gorky, who had previously visited the Solovetski Islands labor camp in 1929 and written about it in the Soviet journal Our Accomplishments, organized the White Sea trip, but did not himself join it. Also along on the White Sea trip was Nikolai Pogodin, screenwriter of Convicts, a 1936 comedy about the BeltBaltLag labor camp.

It is likely that at least some of the visiting writers were aware of the brutality of camp life. In fact, one of the contributors, Sergei Alymov, was a prisoner at the camp and editor of the camp newspaper Perekovka ("Reforging"). Similarly, Aleksandr Avdeenko's account of Belomor includes conversations between OGPU chief Semyon Firin and Prince Mirsky that reveal at least some of the writers were aware of its true nature.

== History of usage ==
=== In 1930s ===
After the canal had been completed and opened for navigation, the Belbaltlag (White Sea-Baltic Camp) was reorganized into the White Sea-Baltic Combine (Baltiysko-Belomorsky Kombinat [BBK]), still within the NKVD system, by an order of the Council of People's Commissars of August 17, 1933. The Combine was charged with operating the canal and managing the economic development of the adjacent areas, including 2.8 million hectares (10,000 sq. mi.) of forest lands and the industrial facilities that had been constructed along the route.

A major part of the Combine's workforce consisted of 75–85,000 Belbaltlag prisoners. In addition, the Combine included 21 "special settlements" (spetsposyolok) with some 30,000 residents, mostly dispossessed farm families transported to Karelia from the USSR's warmer regions. In addition to convicts and "special settlers", the Combine employed about 4,500 free employees and a paramilitary security force. In all, the Combine's employees accounted for about 25% of the population of the Karelian Autonomous Soviet Socialist Republic.

Until 1936, all financial transactions of the Combine were exempt from taxes and duties.

The BBK led to the development of Belomorsk as a major industrial city. New cities and urban-type settlements developed along the route of the canal, such as Medvezhyegorsk, Segezha, Nadvoitsy. Povenets, which had been demoted from a town to a village in the 1920s, now became a town again, and a large port.

As is discussed further below, during the 1930s a number of smaller naval vessels were transferred from the Baltic to the White Sea to provide warships for the Soviet Northern Naval Flotilla, which became the Northern Fleet in 1937.

=== In World War II ===
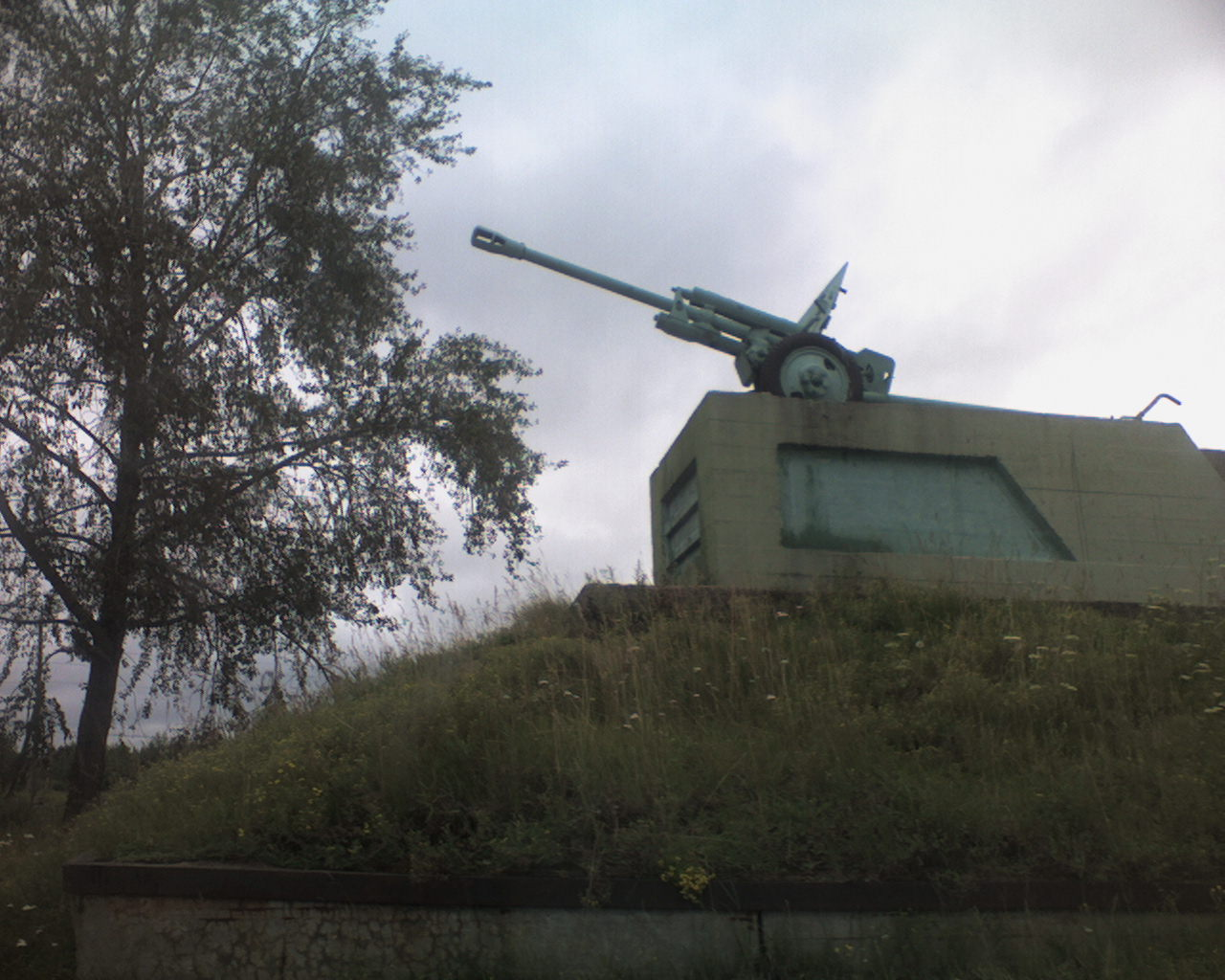
An anti-tank gun in Povenets, commemorating the canal's defenders

There was no action near the White Sea–Baltic Canal during the Winter War of 1939–1940, when the USSR invaded Finland. With Germany's full-scale invasion of the USSR in 1941, supported by Finland in the Continuation War, the canal route became the front line.

On June 23, 1941, the day after the German invasion, 16 Finnish commandos were ferried to the canal by two German Heinkel He 115 seaplanes from Oulujärvi. The commandos were Finnish volunteers recruited by the German Major Schaller, and were equipped with German uniforms and weapons, as the Finnish General Staff wanted no responsibility for the operation. The commandos were to blow up the canal locks, but they failed due to heightened security.

On June 28, the canal was bombed for the first time by the Finnish Air Force, targeting Locks No. 6, 7, 8, and 9, followed the next day by Finnish troops advancing along the Finland-USSR border. The air bombings of the Povenets lock ladder succeeded in interrupting boat traffic on the canal only from June 28 to August 6, and then again from 13 to 24 August 1941. On August 28, the fifth and final bombing raid of the 1941 navigation season took place against Lock No. 7, but it did no damage.

In August, the management of the BBK and most of the 800 canal staff were evacuated from Medvezhyegorsk to Lock No. 19 in Belomorsk, with only 80 left at their stations.

In November, a caravan of passenger vessels evacuating families of Povenets canal workers and residents, along with equipment, froze into the ice of Lake Vygozero. On the night of November 12/13, another boat caravan froze in Zaonezhsky Bay near Megostrov Island, and was later captured by Finnish troops. On December 5, Finnish troops entered Medvezhyegorsk.

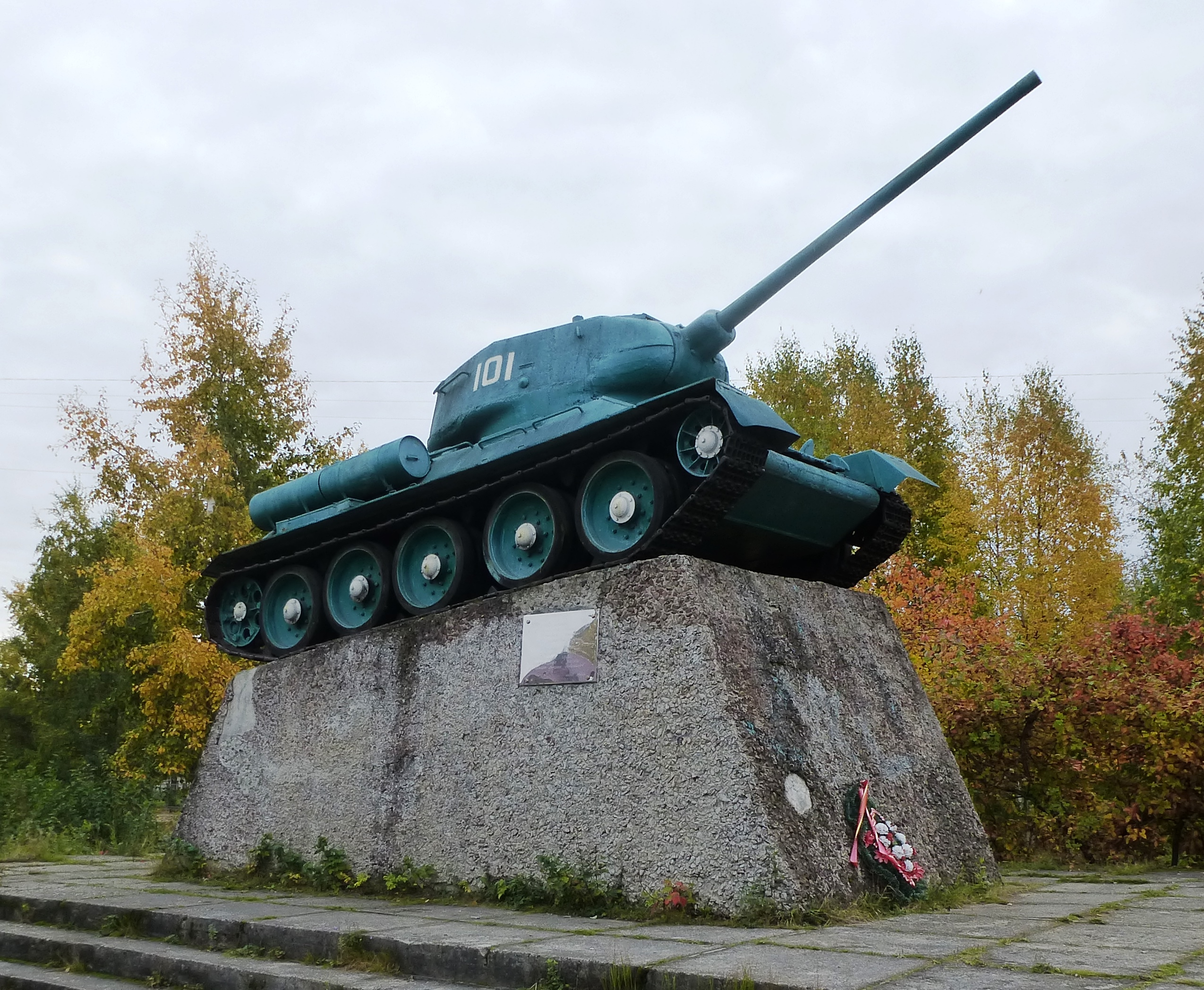
A T-34 installed in 1969 to commemorate the 25th anniversary of the liberation of Medvezhyegorsk

On December 6 in a -37 °C (-35°F) frost, Finnish troops captured Povenets, the southern entrance to the BBK. On the same day, Soviet troops started demolishing canal structures. Lock No. 1 was the first to be blown up. By the morning of December 8, Locks No 1 to 6, and dams No. 4 and 20 had all been demolished.

At the same time, heavy fighting took place near the Povenets Lock Ladder (Locks No. 1 to 7). The Finns crossed the canal and captured Gabselga village to the east, but after a few days of fighting they were pushed back to the canal's western side.

Soviet sappers blew up Lock No. 7 on December 11 after the Red Army had retreated. Once the locks of the Povenets Ladder had been destroyed, water from the watershed lakes poured freely into Lake Onega through Povenets village, which was nearly completely destroyed by the flood. The route of the BBK had become the front line, separating the Finnish troops on the canal's western bank from the Soviet forces on its eastern bank. The opposing armies held these positions until June 1944.

=== Postwar years ===
After Finland left the war in September 1944, the damage to the canal, including the complete destruction of its southern section and the town of Povenets and damage to lighthouses and other structures, was repaired. Rebuilding was completed by July 1946, with navigation through the canal restored on July 28, 1946.

On February 2, 1950, the RSFSR Council of Ministers issued an order for the overhaul and reconstruction of the BBK's structures, with gradual electrification of the canal's structures and machinery. In 1953, the locks' staff hired electricians; by 1957, the electrification of the locks of the northern slope was completed; and by 1959 all coastal and floating navigation lights were switched to electric power.

The importance of BBK for the national economy greatly increased after the commissioning of the modern Volga–Baltic Waterway in 1964. Canal capacity and the annual volume of freight traffic increased several-fold.

Another upgrade took place in the 1970s. During the reconstruction, the guaranteed depth of the fairway was increased to 4 meters (13 feet), and the channel became part of the Unified Deep Water System of European Russia.

== Canal use ==
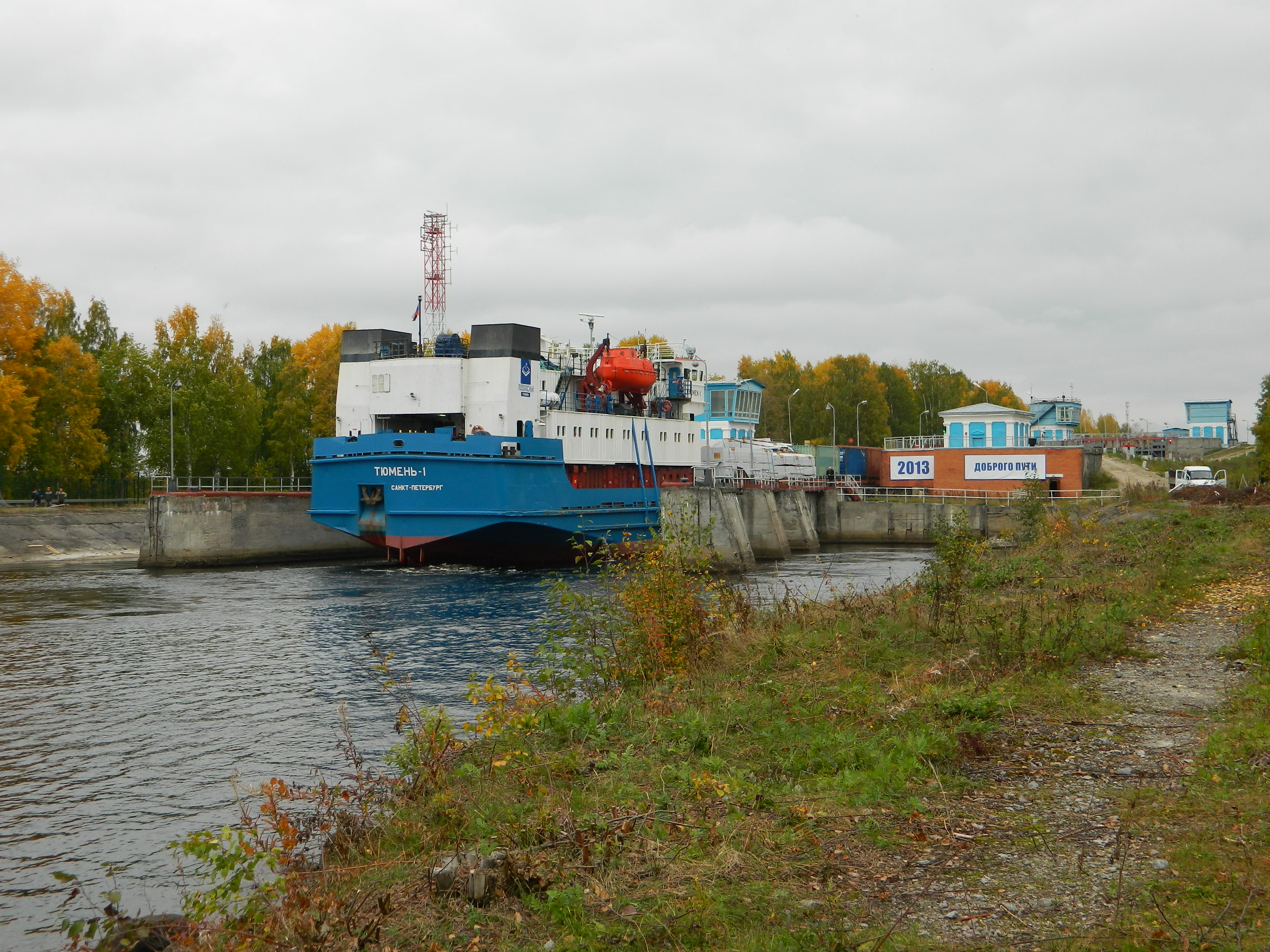
A freighter enters Lock No. 1

During the first navigation in 1933, 1.143 million tons of cargo and 27,000 passengers were transported through the canal. In 1940 traffic volume was approximately 1 million tons, representing 44% of capacity

Cargo tonnage peaked in 1985, with 7.3 million tonnes transported. Tonnage remained high until 1990, then declined after the fall of the Soviet Union. Usage rose gradually in the 21st century, but remained well below the Soviet-era peak, with just 0.3 million tonnes in 2002.

During the 2007 season, the canal carried 0.4 million tonnes of cargo along with 2,500 passengers. It is now operated by the White Sea and Lake Onega Waterways and Shipping Administration (Беломорско-Онежское государственное бассейновое управление водных путей и судоходства), which is also responsible for shipping on Lake Onega and in the Belomorsk harbor area (but not in the open waters of the White Sea). The canal was seemingly a small part of the agency's overall shipping business, which in 2007 amounted to 4.6 million tonnes and 155,000 passengers.

According to official statistics, a total of 193 million tonnes of cargo was transported over the canal over its first 75 years (1933–2008).

The canal makes it possible to ship heavy and bulky items from Russia's industrial centers to the White Sea, and then by sea-going vessels to Siberia's northern ports. For example, in the summer of 2007, a large piece of equipment for Rosneft's Siberian Vankor Oil Field was delivered by the Amur-1516 from Dzerzhinsk on the Oka River, via the Volga–Baltic Waterway and the White Sea Canal to Arkhangelsk, and from there by the ocean-going SA-15 class Arctic cargo ship Kapitan Danilkin to Dudinka on the Yenisei River. In 2011, heavy equipment for the Sayano-Shushenskaya hydro power plant was shipped from Saint Petersburg via the canal, the Arctic Sea, and the Yenisei River.

=== Oil product shipping ===
In Soviet times, the canal was used for shipping oil products from refineries on the Volga River to consumers in the Murmansk Oblast and overseas. Russia's Volgotanker Company, with a fleet of suitably sized petroleum tankers and ore-bulk-oil carriers, pioneered this route starting August 1970, when Nefterudovoz-3 delivered a cargo of fuel oil to the White Sea port of Kandalaksha.

After many years of interruption, Volgotanker resumed the canal route in 2003. The company had plans to carry 800,000 tonnes of fuel oil over the canal during 2003, and to increase the volume to 1,500,000 t (1,476,000 long tons; 1,653,000 short tons) in 2004. The fuel was transferred from Volgotanker river tankers to Latvian seagoing tankers at a floating transfer station near the Osinki Island in the Onega Bay on the White Sea, 36 km (22 mi) northwest of the port of Onega.

Transfer operations began 24 June 2003, but on 1 September a low-speed collision between Volgotanker's Nefterudovoz-57M and the Latvian Zoja-I during a transfer caused a crack in the Nefterudovoz's hull, with a subsequent oil spillage estimated at 45 t (44 long tons; 50 short tons), of which only 9 t (8.9 long tons; 9.9 short tons) were recovered. Volgotanker's alleged failure to contain the spill resulted in the Arkhangelsk Oblast authorities shutting down the oil transfer operation with only 220,000 tonnes exported. The company was fined and future operations were refused.

=== Military use ===
Soviet (and later Russian) naval strategists long believed that a well-designed canal system could help establish contact among the separate fleets based on Russia's Black Sea, Baltic, Arctic, Pacific, and Caspian coasts. The White Sea Canal was also constructed with this military use in mind, and early in its history the Northern Fleet's first warships sailed along the canal to the White Sea from the Baltic, Before World War II, the canal was used for the transfer of military vessels between the two seas on 17 occasions.

During World War II, in August–September 1941, the canal was used to move a number of submarines from the Baltic Fleet to the White Sea, including submarines K-3, S-101 and S-102, L-22. Some unfinished submarines from Leningrad's Baltic Shipyard and Gorky's Krasnoye Sormovo shipyard sailed to the new Sevmash shipyard in Severodvinsk.

Since then, the canal has been regularly used for delivering submarines by transporter dock from the Baltic Shipyard and Krasnoye Sormovo to Sevmash for completion.

=== Hydroelectric stations ===
The canal system includes five hydroelectric power plants with total production capacity of 240 MW.

== Commemoration ==
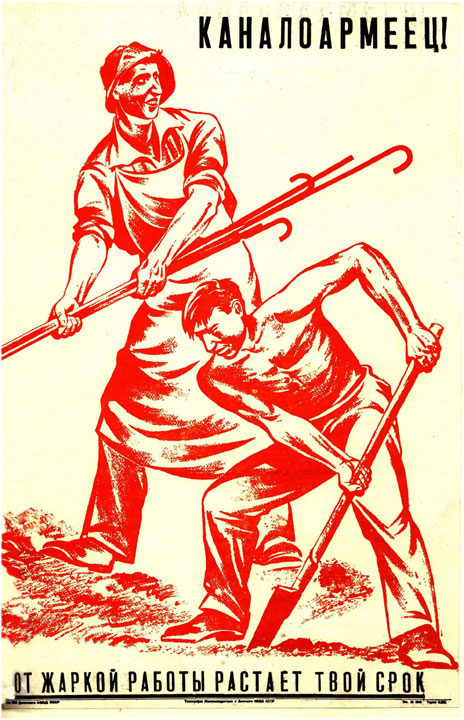
A Kanaloarmeyets poster

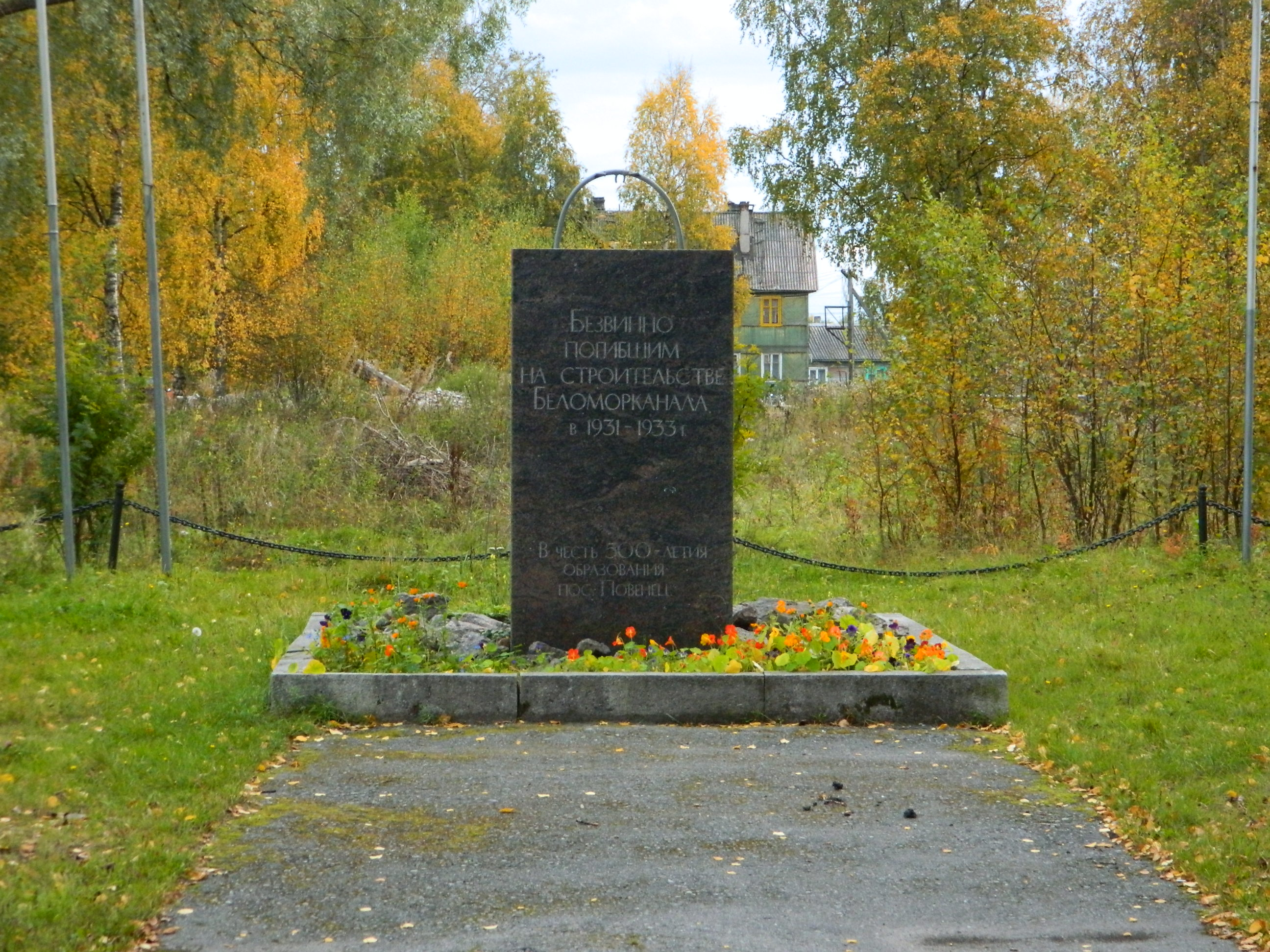
A memorial to canal construction victims in Povenets

The canal gave its name to the Belomorkanal Soviet cigarette brand. There is a monument at Povenets for the prisoners who perished during the construction, and a smaller memorial in Belomorsk near the White Sea end. There was even a comedic play written about the canal by Nikolay Pogodin. The canal project also gave the Russian language the slang word "zeka", "zek, z/k" for "inmate". In Russian, "inmate", "incarcerated" is заключённый (zakliuchyonnyi), usually abbreviated to "з/к" in paperwork, and pronounced as "зэка" (IPA: [zɨˈka], "zeh-KA"), which gradually transformed into "зэк" and "зек", zek (both pronounced as IPA: [ˈzɛk]).

The word is still in colloquial use. Originally the abbreviation stood for zaklyuchyonny kanaloarmeyets (заключённый каналоармеец), literally "incarcerated canal-army-man". The latter term coined in an analogy with the words "krasnoarmeyets" meaning "member of the Red Army" or trudarmeyets (member of a labor army). According to the Soviet account, in 1932 when Anastas Mikoyan visited the Belomorstroy construction site, Lazar Kogan asked, "Comrade Mikoyan, what shall we call them? (...) I thought up the word: 'kanaloarmeyets'. What do you think?" Mikoyan approved.

== See also ==
- Volga–Don Canal
- Unified Deep Water System of European Russia

== Sources ==
- "Landscape and Vision at the White Sea–Baltic Canal and The Visual Economy of Forced Labor: Alexander Rodchenko and the White Sea–Baltic Canal". Picturing Russia: Explorations in Visual Culture. Yale University Press. 2008. pp. 168–174. doi:10.2307/j.ctt5vm1n6. ISBN 9780300119619. JSTOR j.ctt5vm1n6.
- Applebaum, A. (2003). "The White Sea Canal". Gulag: A History. Doubleday.
- Brunswic, A. (2009). Les eaux glacées du Belomorkanal: récit (in French). Actes Sud. ISBN 978-2-7427-8214-7.
- Dmitriev, Y. A. (2003). The White Sea – Baltic Canal, from plan to implementation: A collection of documents (in Russian). Petrozavodsk: Unknown.
- Draskoczy, J. (2012). "The "Put' of Perekovka": Transforming Lives at Stalin's White Sea–Baltic Canal". Russian Review. 71 (1): 30–48. doi:10.1111/j.1467-9434.2012.00641.x. JSTOR 41409422.
- Geldern, J. V. (1995). "The Stalin White Sea—Baltic Canal". In Stites, R. (ed.). Mass Culture in Soviet Russia: Tales, Poems, Songs, Movies, Plays, and Folklore, 1917–1953. Indiana University Press. pp. 190–201. ISBN 9780253329110. JSTOR j.ctt16xwcdw.45.
- Gorky, M.; Averbakh, L.; Georgievich Firin, S. (1935). The White Sea canal: being an account of the construction of the new canal between the White Sea and the Baltic Sea. Translated by A. Williams-Ellis. London: John Lane.
- Khlevniuk, O. V. (2004). The History of the Gulag. From Collectivization to the Great Terror. New Haven: Yale University Press. ISBN 0300092849.
- Mäkinen, Ilkka (1993). "Libraries in Hell: Cultural Activities in Soviet Prisons and Labor Camps from the 1930s to the 1950s". Libraries & Culture. 28 (2): 117–142. JSTOR 25542531.
- Morukov, M. (2003). "The White Sea Canal". In Paul R. Gregory; V. V. Lazarev (eds.). The Economics of Forced Labor. The Soviet Gulag (PDF) (Online ed.). Hoover Institution Press at Stanford. pp. 151–162.
- Ruder, C. A. (1998). Making History for Stalin: The Story of the Belomor Canal. University Press of Florida. ISBN 9780813015675.
