= Convict (film) =

1936 film by Yevgeni Chervyakov

- Russian: Заключённые
- Directed by: Yevgeni Chervyakov
- Written by: Nikolay Pogodin
- Starring: Mikhail Astangov; Mikhail Yanshin; Boris Dobronravov; Vera Yanukova; Nadezhda Yermakovich
- Cinematography: Mikhail Gindin; Boris Petrov; Svyatoslav Belyayev
- Music by: Yuri Shaporin
- Release date: 1936
- Country: Soviet Union
- Language: Russian

Convict (Russian: Заключённые) is a 1936 Soviet drama film directed by Yevgeni Chervyakov.

The film shows a group of prisoners who arrive at the NKVD camp in the North. One of them immediately heads the hut and forbids everyone to work while the Chekists try to re-educate them.

== Plot ==
A group of new prisoners arrives at an NKVD labor camp in the far North, where inmates are engaged in constructing the White Sea–Baltic Canal. Among the arrivals are Sadowsky, a hydroengineer sentenced to 10 years for sabotage, and Kostya-Captain, a repeat offender and leader among the criminal inmates. Kostya-Captain initially disrupts the camp's operations by discouraging labor, undermining the "shock construction" project and its rehabilitative objectives.

The narrative also highlights Sonka, a female bandit with a history of robberies and killings who had avoided work for 15 years. Over time, Sonka begins to reform and encourages Kostya-Captain to change his ways as well. The camp administration employs a combination of tact and persistence in their efforts to rehabilitate prisoners, presenting Soviet power as humane and reform-focused.

Kostya-Captain is eventually appointed head of an expedition to raft timber for the construction project, receiving weapons on a signed receipt for the task. His success is reported in the camp newspaper, Perekovka. The film further depicts the rehabilitation of engineers Botkin and Sadowsky, both convicted of sabotage. In the camp, they renounce their previous beliefs, contribute to the canal's completion, and are rewarded with early release and nominations for awards.

In the final scene, the steamship Karl Marx navigates the locks of the Povenets Staircase on the completed White Sea–Baltic Canal.

== Cast ==
- Mikhail Astangov as Kostya
- Mikhail Yanshin as Max
- Boris Dobronravov as Director Gromov
- Vera Yanukova as Sonya
- Nadezhda Yermakovich as Margarita Ivanova
- Mark Bernes
- Aleksandr Cheban as Official of the G.P.U.
- Mariya Goricheva as Mother Sadovsky
- Gennadiy Michurin as Engineer Botkin
- Konstantin Nazarenko as Lemon
- Pavel Olenev as Sasha
- Boris Tamarin as Engineer Sandovsky
- Vyacheslav Novikov as Mitya (uncredited)
