= Sergey Zhuk =

Soviet engineer (1892–1957)

- Zhuk in 1953
- Born: Sergey Yakovlevich Zhuk; 4 April 1892; Kyiv, Russian Empire
- Died: 1 March 1957 (aged 64); Moscow, Soviet Union
- Education: Institute of Railway Engineers
- Engineering career
- Discipline: Military engineering
- Institutions: Academy of Sciences of the Soviet Union
- Projects: White Sea–Baltic Canal; Moscow Canal
- Awards: Hero of Socialist Labour; Stalin Prize

Sergey Yakovlevich Zhuk (Russian: Сергей Яковлевич Жук; April 4, 1892 – March 1, 1957) was a Soviet hydraulic engineer, technician and state official. Hero of Socialist Labour (1952).

== Biography ==
=== Early life ===
Zhuk was born in to a middle class Ukrainian family in Kyiv. He attended the 2nd Kyiv high school and after the death of his father he was enrolled in the Orlovsk Cadet Corps. In 1914 he enrolled in the Petrograd Institute for Civil Engineers, a year later he moved to the State University of Transportation in St. Petersburg. Due to the great losses that the Russian army suffered in fighting with German troops, Zhuk was forcibly drafted and transferred to the Alekseevsk School for Pioneers in Kyiv, whose training he completed in November 1916. He then did military service in a pioneer battalion in Siberia.

During the Russian Civil War he took the side of the White Army and fought for the forces under Alexander Kolchak. At the end of 1919, during the defeat of the army Kolchak, second lieutenant Zhuk was taken prisoner but was later released. In 1921–1922 he worked in Sevzapvod, then was enrolled in the Red Army and taught engineering at the Kamenev United military school, in the Sumy artillery and in the Poltava infantry schools.

=== State engineer ===
On January 10, 1931, he was arrested by the organs of the OGPU in the "Vesna" case and was accused of involvement in a counter-revolutionary officer organization and was convicted by the judicial board of the OGPU. He was sent to the construction of the White Sea–Baltic Canal and showed himself there as an engineer and on July 14, 1932, was released on parole "for more efficient use in construction."

In October 1932 he was enrolled in the staff of the OGPU and was appointed to the post of deputy chief engineer of Belomorstroy. From 1933 he was Deputy Chief Engineer and Chief Engineer for the construction of the Moscow Canal. In the position of Deputy Chief Engineer of Belomorostroi, he carried out scientific and technical leadership in the design of the largest hydraulic structures. In August 1933 he was awarded the Order of Lenin. People were not spared on construction, the main thing for the leadership was the fulfillment of the plan. In the book The Gulag Archipelago, Alexander Solzhenitsyn named Zhuk among the main culprits of the mass death of Gulag prisoners during the construction of the canal.

From September 1935 he was the Chief Construction Engineer of the Uglich, Rybinsk and Ivankovskaya Hydroelectric Power Plants. From June 1939 he was First Deputy Head of the Construction Directorate of the Kuibyshev hydroelectric complex. From September 1939 Zhuk became chief engineer and first deputy chief of the Glavgidrostroy of the NKVD of the USSR.

=== World War II and later life ===
Zhuk was a participant in the Second World War, in August 1941, he was appointed chief engineer and deputy head of the Main Directorate of Defense Work (GUOBR) of the NKVD. At the same time, in November 1941, he was the head of the hydrotechnical works department of the Glavpromstroy of the NKVD. In 1942 he became a member of the Communist Party of the Soviet Union.

From 1942 to 1957 he was the permanent head of the design and survey department of hydraulic works (Gidroproekt) of the Glavpromstroy NKVD of the USSR and oater Ministry of Internal Affairs of the USSR. From 1944, he was also a member of the Technical and Economic Council of the USSR State Planning Committee. At the same time, since March 1948, he was the chief engineer of the Volgodonstroy of the USSR Ministry of Internal Affairs and was responsible for the construction of the Volga–Don Canal and Tsimlyanskaya Hydroelectric Power Station.

Zhuk was a member of the Central Executive Committee of the Soviet since 1935 and was elected an Academician of the Academy of Sciences of the Soviet Union since 1953. He was a Major General of the Engineering and Technical Service since 1943.

After his death on March 1, 1957, he was cremated, the ashes were placed in an urn in the Kremlin Wall on Red Square in Moscow.

== Awards and honors ==
- Hero of Socialist Labour (9/19/1952) – for particularly outstanding services in the construction of the Lenin Volga–Don Canal
- Three Orders of Lenin – for ensuring high-quality design work on the construction of the White Sea–Baltic Canal
- Order of the Red Banner (01/30/1951)
- Order of the Red Banner of Labour (07/14/1944)
- Two Orders of the Red Star (07/14/1937; 12/10/1945)
- Medal "For Battle Merit"
- Medal "For Labour Valour" (04/26/1940)
- Medal "For Valiant Labour in the Great Patriotic War of 1941–1945." (1945)
- Stalin Prize of the second degree (1950) – for the development of the Volga–Don Canal project.
- Stalin Prize of the first degree (1951) – for the development of the design assignment for the Kuibyshev hydroelectric power station on the Volga.
- Honored Worker of the USSR Ministry of Internal Affairs (11/2/1948)
