= Nikolai Pogodin =

Soviet playwright

- Nikolai Fyodorovich Stukalov
- Born: 16 November 1900 (3 November 1900 in Gregorian calendar); Gundorovskaya village, Donskoy region, Russian Empire
- Died: 19 September 1962 (aged 61); Moscow, the RSFSR, the USSR
- Citizenship: USSR
- Occupations: Writer, playwright
- Writing career
- Language: Russian
- Years active: 1920–1962
- Genres: Plays, scripts
- Notable awards: Stalin Prize 1941, 1951; Lenin Prize 1959; Honored Artist of the RSFSR 1949; For Valiant Labor in the Great Patriotic War 1941–1945; The Order of Lenin
- Movement: Socialist Realism

Nikolai Fyodorovich Pogodin (Russian: Никола́й Фёдорович Пого́дин) (pseudonym of Nikolai F. Stukalov) (16 November [O.S. 3 November] 1900 – 19 September 1962) was a Soviet playwright. His plays were recognized in Soviet Union theater for their realistic portrayals of common life combined with socialist and communist themes. He is most widely known as the author of a trilogy about Lenin, the first time Lenin was used as a character in any theatrical works.

== Early life and pre-theater career ==
Pogodin was born Nikolai Stukalov in modern-day Donetsk Oblast on 16 November [O.S. 3 November] 1900. Both parents were peasants. His educational career lasted through the elementary level. Between 14 and 20, Pogodin worked a variety of low-level jobs: selling newspapers, distributing supplies for typewriters and dental equipment, working in a machine shop, bookbinding and carpentry. During the Russian Civil War he served as a volunteer with the Red Army. In 1920 he worked as a reporter for the Rostov-on-Don newspaper Trudovaya zhizn, and was a traveling correspondent for Pravda from 1922 to 1932. From 1925 he lived in Moscow.

Pogodin died in Moscow on 19 September 1962. He was 61 years old.

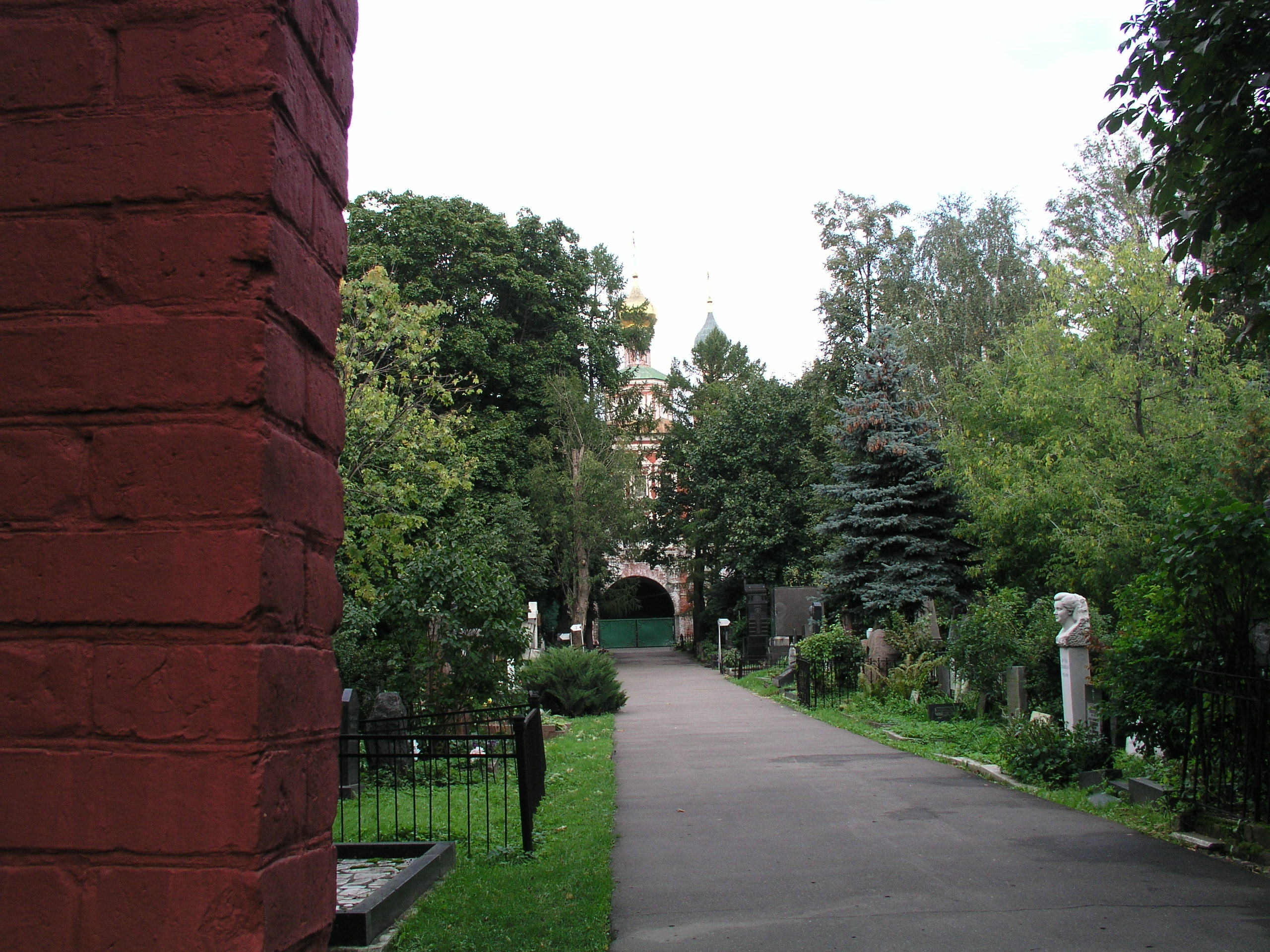
Novodevichy Cemetery, where Pogodin is buried

== Career ==
Pogodin's series of three plays featuring Lenin as a character was part of a Soviet movement referred to as Leniniana, which sought to control the way Lenin was portrayed in artistic works. In 1936, the government commissioned, under the People's Commissariat of Education, a collection of writers and directors to make films depicting Lenin and also the revolution in an approved format and presentation style. Among those invited to the initial commission were Alexander Korneichuk, Alexander Afinogenov, Vladimir Kirshon, and the novelist Alexei Tolstoi. Despite his historical significance of presenting Lenin in this approved style, Pogodin was not invited at first. Instead, he volunteered to join the commission and was accepted.

Pogodin did not limit his writing to mainstream theater. He also lent his screenplay skills to the State Leningrad Puppet Theater of Fairy Tales with a play titled The Tale of the Beast Called Indrik. Pogodin also provided a report on children's literature at the Tenth Plenary Meeting of the Union of Soviet Writers in 1946.

Despite working under restrictive creative conditions, Pogodin did support the primary journal for "permitted, formal" dissent at the time, Novyi Mir.

In 1929, Pogodin's first play, Tempo (Temp, 1929) was published after a visit to the Stalingrad Tractor Plant, where the play was later set. The play's major theme of young Communists outdoing their American counterparts was a common theme of Soviet Realism. His later works, Poema o topore (A Poem about an Ax, 1930) and Moi Drug (My Friend, 1930) also touched on themes of soviet industrialism and ingenuity. His plays frequently mixed "factual reports" with dramatization.

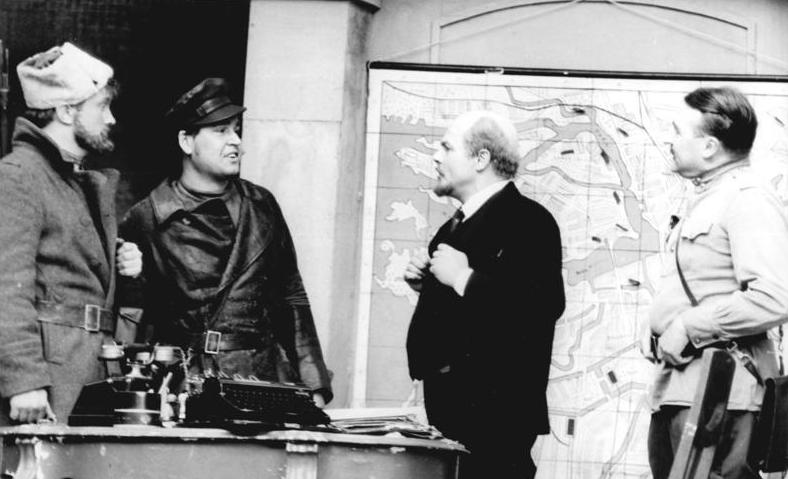
A rehearsal of Pogodin's play, Chelovek s ruzhyom (Man with a Gun).

His most popular play was Chelovek s ruzhyom (Man with a Gun, 1937), about Shadrin, a soldier who comes to Petrograd in October 1917 and gets involved in the Revolution; the climax of the play is his meeting with Lenin. The second play in his Lenin trilogy, Kremlyovskie kuranty (The chimes of the Kremlin, 1940), was set in 1920 and featured a scene in which Lenin talks with an old Jewish watchmaker engaged in repairing the Kremlin chimes so they can play the Internationale; the third, Tretya pateticheskaya (The Third: Pathetic, 1958) used the news of Lenin's death as a tragic leitmotif. Kogda lomaiutsya kop'ya (When the Spears Break, 1953) was a comedy; Sonet Petrarki (Petrarch's Sonnet, 1956) "takes the position that there are certain individual matters--personal feelings and affairs of the heart--which are none of the collective's or the Party's business."

From 1951 to 1960 Pogodin was the chief editor of the theatrical journal Teatr.

== Early works, style and historical context ==
The works of Nikolai Pogodin fall under, or closely adhere to, the wider artistic movement known as Socialist realism. Pogodin being a Socialist Realist playwright created his works by taking topics that were prevalent in early Soviet history. Many of his works are an example of the early difficulties of the construction of the early Soviet era. His first play was "Tempo" written in 1929, a story of a tractor factory. The second play written by Pogodin was "Impertinence". This play was about the youth who lived in a commune. Third was "Poem of an Axe" written in 1930 which was a story about rust-resistant axe blades that the Soviet Union was dependent on the West for supplies. Next was the play "Snow" about Soviet scientific exploration. Pogodin next wrote "My Friend" in 1932 that was about the building of a large factory in a peasant country.

In 1933, Pogodin took part in a carefully organized writers' tour of the White Sea–Baltic Canal that was being constructed with prison labor. A year later, in 1934, he wrote the play "Aristocrats" about the rehabilitation of criminals in the labor camp that was building the Canal. This play became the screenplay of Convicts, a 1936 Soviet comedy about this BeltBaltLag labor camp.

Pogodin's earliest works were produced during the First five-year economic plan for the Soviet Union. During the Great Purge, Pogodin released several plays about Lenin and the growth of the new Soviet government. Despite the period of the Great Purge marking a shift for plots focusing on internal and external threats to the Soviet cause or Stalin, Pogodin pushed for writing that averted the simplistic to penetrate "people's traumatized psyches" in order to achieve healing. Risking the ire of Kremlin and Soviet censors, Pogodin resisted attempts of the government under the guise of Socialist realism to hide the impact of policies on his characters.

In his play The Three of Us Came To Virgin Lands, Pogodin tells the story of government efforts to turn parts of Siberia into a wheat-generating region despite the difficulties of agriculture in the region. His characters were portrayed as sympathetic, somewhat suffering, and "less than heroic." The play was later televised, quickly recognized by the Kremlin and panned by Pravda for insulting the "patriotic movement" of communism.

== Awards and commemorations ==
He was awarded the title of Honored Art Workers of the Russian Republic. In addition to the Lenin Prize, he was given the Stalin Prize in 1941. In 1949, he became an Honored Artist of the RSFSR. Pogodin was also awarded the State Stalin Prize (Stalinskaya Premia) of the second category in 1951. Petropavlovsk is one of the first cities in Kazakhstan to have a theatrical life. The Pogodin Russian Drama Theater was erected in 1906. In 1934, Pogodin appeared for the first time in the Petropavlovsk playbill featuring his play My Friend. Evacuated artists from surrounding theaters arrived to Petropavlovsk in 1941. The theater was named after Pogodin in 1962. In 1972, the theater moved into a modern building located in Teatralnaya Square. The mission of the Russian Theater, named after Pogodin, never ran out of artistically challenging plays. The theater is seen as a link between Kazakh and Russian cultures, by facilitating their interaction and mutual enrichment. The theater takes pride in upholding the standards of creativity in the region and preserving the moral and aesthetic values through its theater productions.
