= Israel Pliner =

Soviet officer and secret police functionary (1896–1938)

- Израиль Плинер
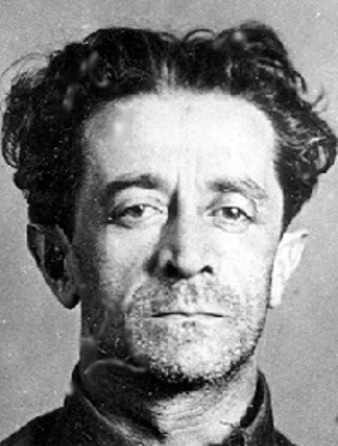
- Pliner in 1938

Head of the Gulag
- In office 21 August 1937 – 14 November 1938
- Preceded by: Matvei Berman
- Succeeded by: Gleb Filaretov

Personal details
- Born: 22 January 1896 Pastavy, Vilna Governorate, Russian Empire
- Died: 23 February 1939 (aged 43) Kommunarka shooting ground, Russian SFSR, Soviet Union
- Cause of death: Execution
- Party: Communist Party of the Soviet Union (1922–1938)

Israel Pliner (Russian: Израиль Израилевич Плинер, romanized: Izrail Izrailevich Pliner; 22 January 1896 – 23 February 1939) was a Soviet officer and high functionary of the Soviet secret police. Notable posts include deputy chief of the Gulag from 1935 to 1937 and chief administrator of the Gulag from 16 August 1937 to 16 November 1938.

== Biography ==
Pliner was born in the Vilna Governorate of the Russian Empire. His parents were Jewish.

He joined the Red Army in 1919 and the Russian Communist Party (b) in 1922. Pilner was one of the main collaborators of Nikolai Yezhov, head of the NKVD in the years 1936–1938, and collaborator of other organizers of the Great Purge.

He was arrested on charges of counter-revolutionary activities in 1938 and executed in 1939 at the NKVD's Kommunarka shooting ground.

On October 27, 1956, Israel Pliner was legally rehabilitated.
