= Honor board =

Celebratory list designed for encouragement

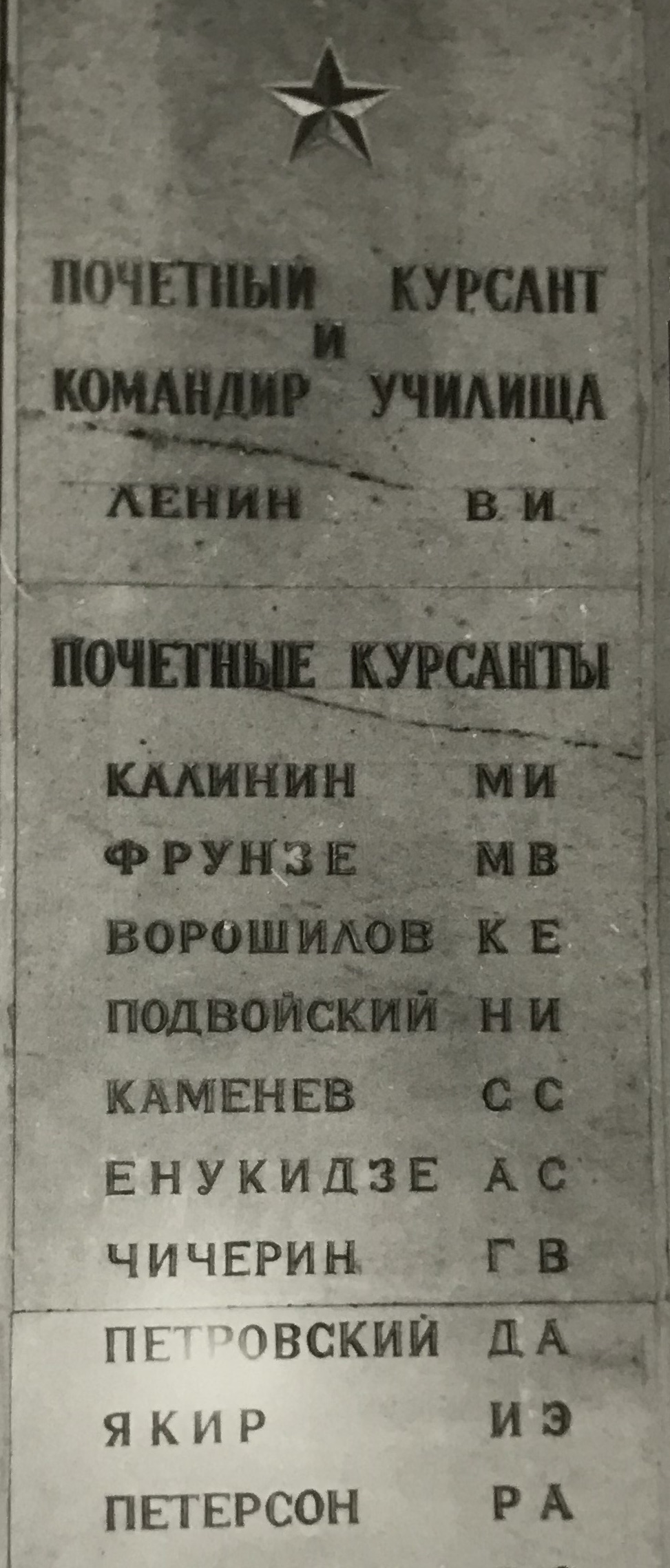
MVOKU honor board with a list of honorary cadets.

Honor Board, Board of Honor (Russian: Доска почета) in Russia and in Soviet Union is a special board; a stand with the names and photographs (later) of persons who graduated from educational institutions with honors, honorary military personnel, scientists, best employees, and so on.

The honor board was usually a wide shield covered with red cloth, and was located at the entrance or in the lobby of a building owned by the organization.

== History ==
The history of honor boards can be traced back centuries. Already in the 14th century, after the liberation of China from the Mongol yoke, the founder of the new Ming dynasty, Emperor Hongwu, ordered the construction of two pavilions in each village of the empire, one of which would display the good deeds of the residents, and the other would contain a list of offenses committed by the villagers. In the same pavilions, village elders dealt with civil cases and tried violators.

In the Russian Empire, in military educational institutions, marble plaques were used as measures to encourage and “excite competition and striving for military valor in students,” it was ordered to have: in the recreational halls of all institutions - gray marble plaques, with the names of the most outstanding pupils of each graduation, and in the churches of the institutions there are black marble plaques to place the names of all former pupils who “fell in the name of honor or died from wounds received in battle, in whatever officer rank they suffered the glorious death of a warrior.”

During the Chinese Civil War, red and black boards became widespread in the Chinese Red Army and the “liberated areas” already in the 1930s.

In the first years of Soviet power, the Honor Board was called the red board, while as its opposite there was a black board (board of shame; see also Blacklisting (Soviet policy)), on which drunkards, truants and slackers were listed. The honor board was provided for by the “Internal Labor Regulations”, which managed the labor regulations in Soviet institutions, enterprises and organizations. In addition, there were city, district, regional, regional and republican honor boards.

With the collapse of the USSR and the change in the political and economic system in the early 1990s, the use of honor boards remained in Russia, in the Russian Armed Forces.

== Gallery ==
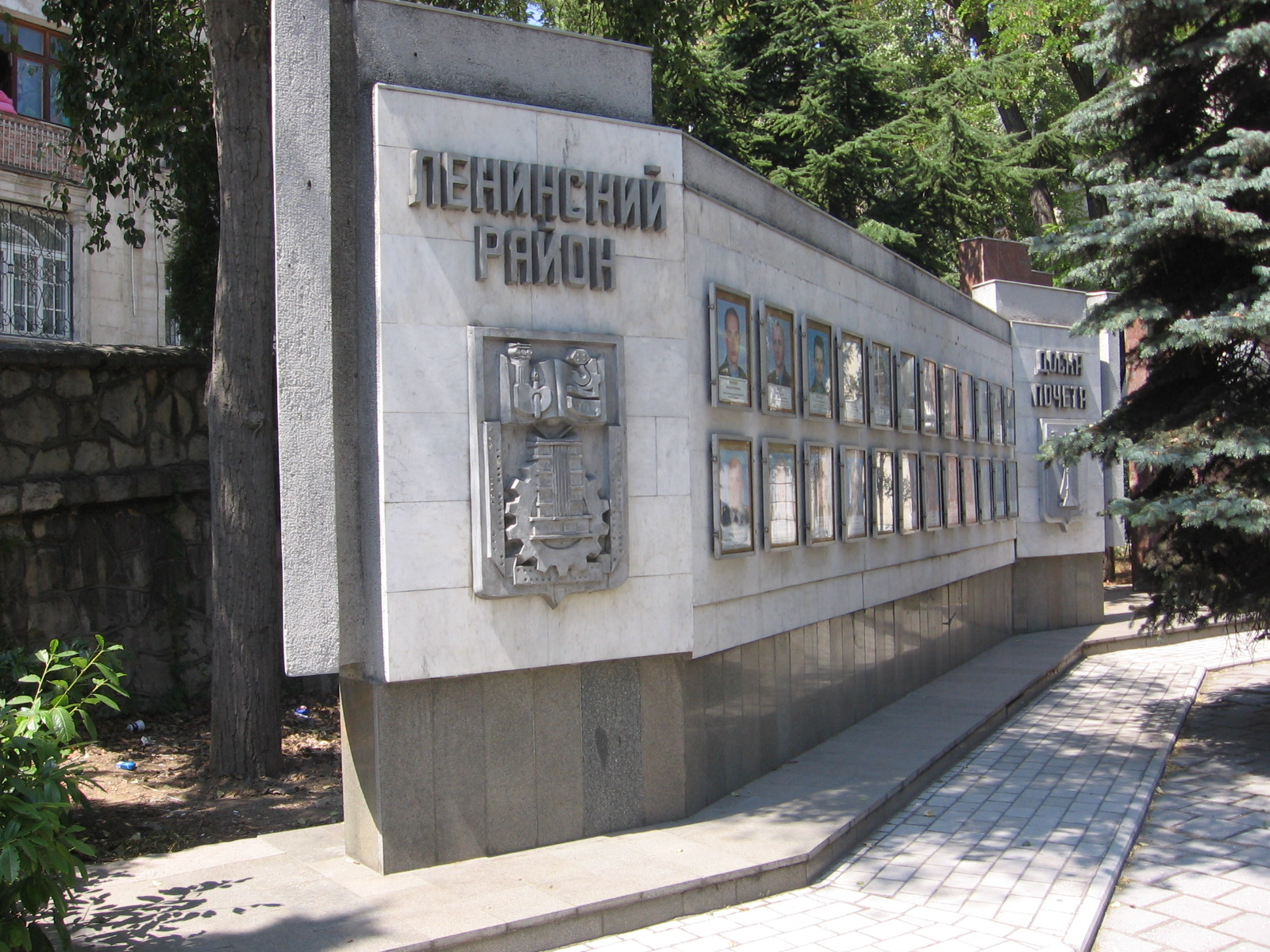
Lenin District of Sevastopol

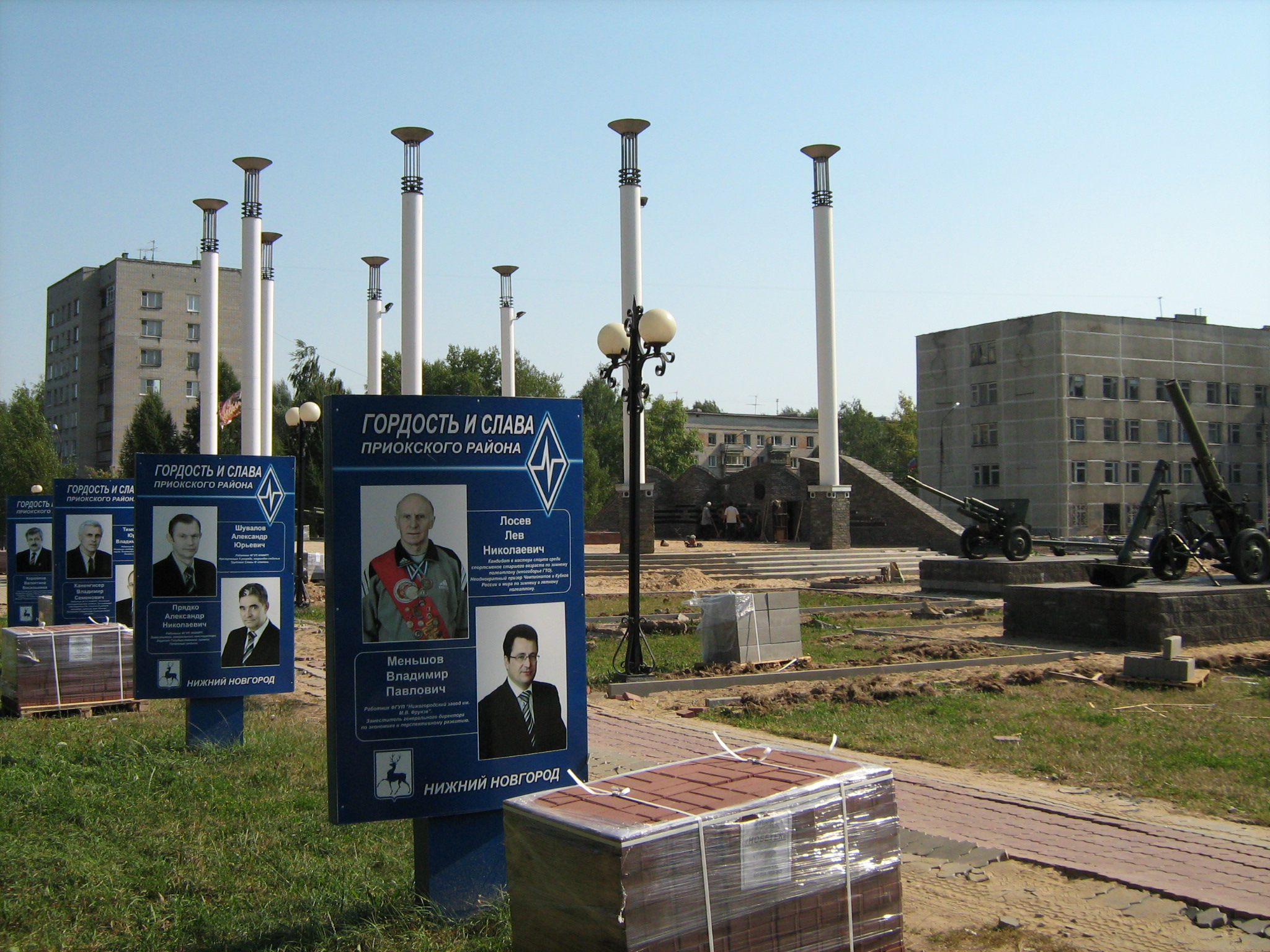
“Pride and glory of the Prioksky district” (Nizhny Novgorod)

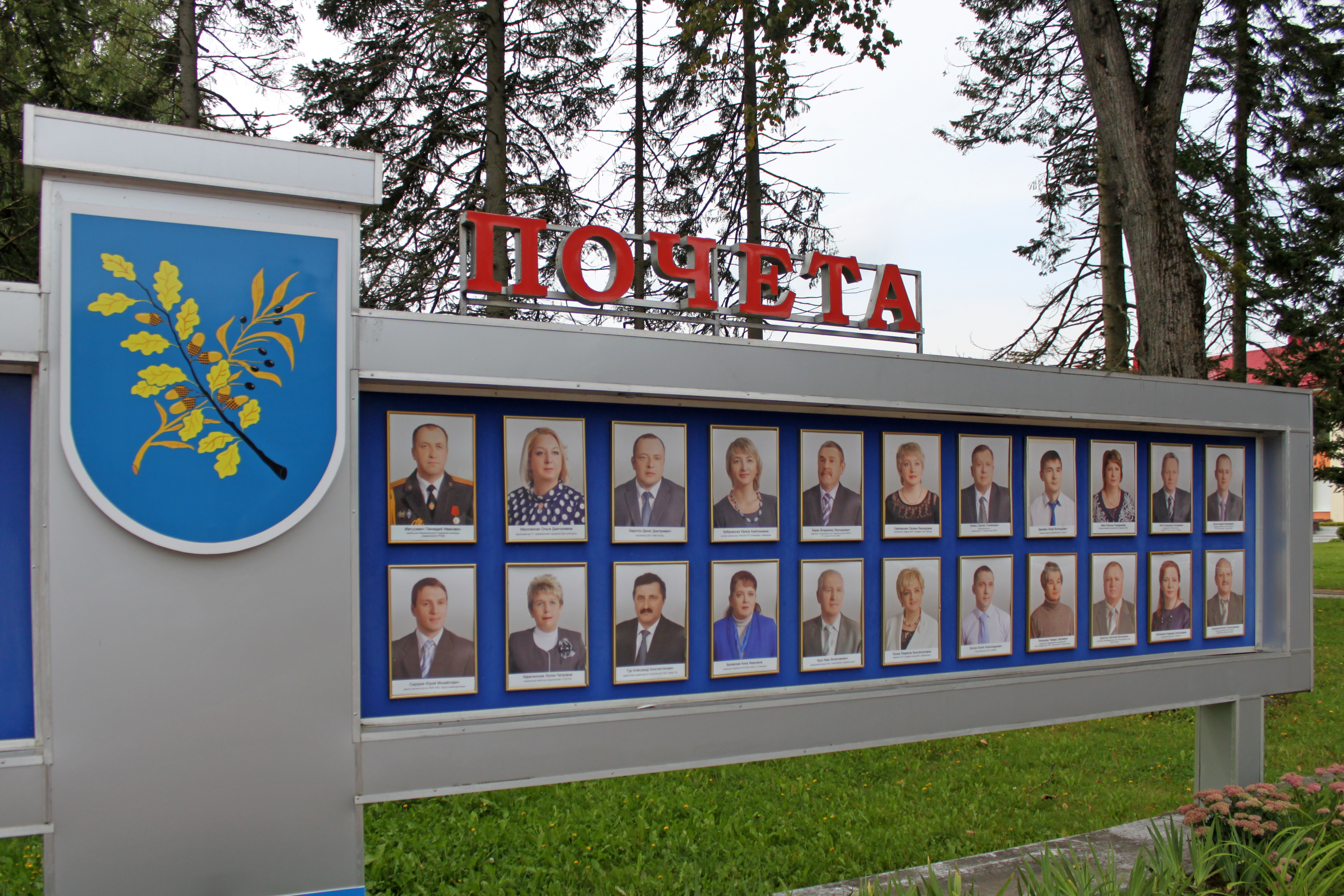
Honor board in Dzerzhinsk (Minsk region), Belarus

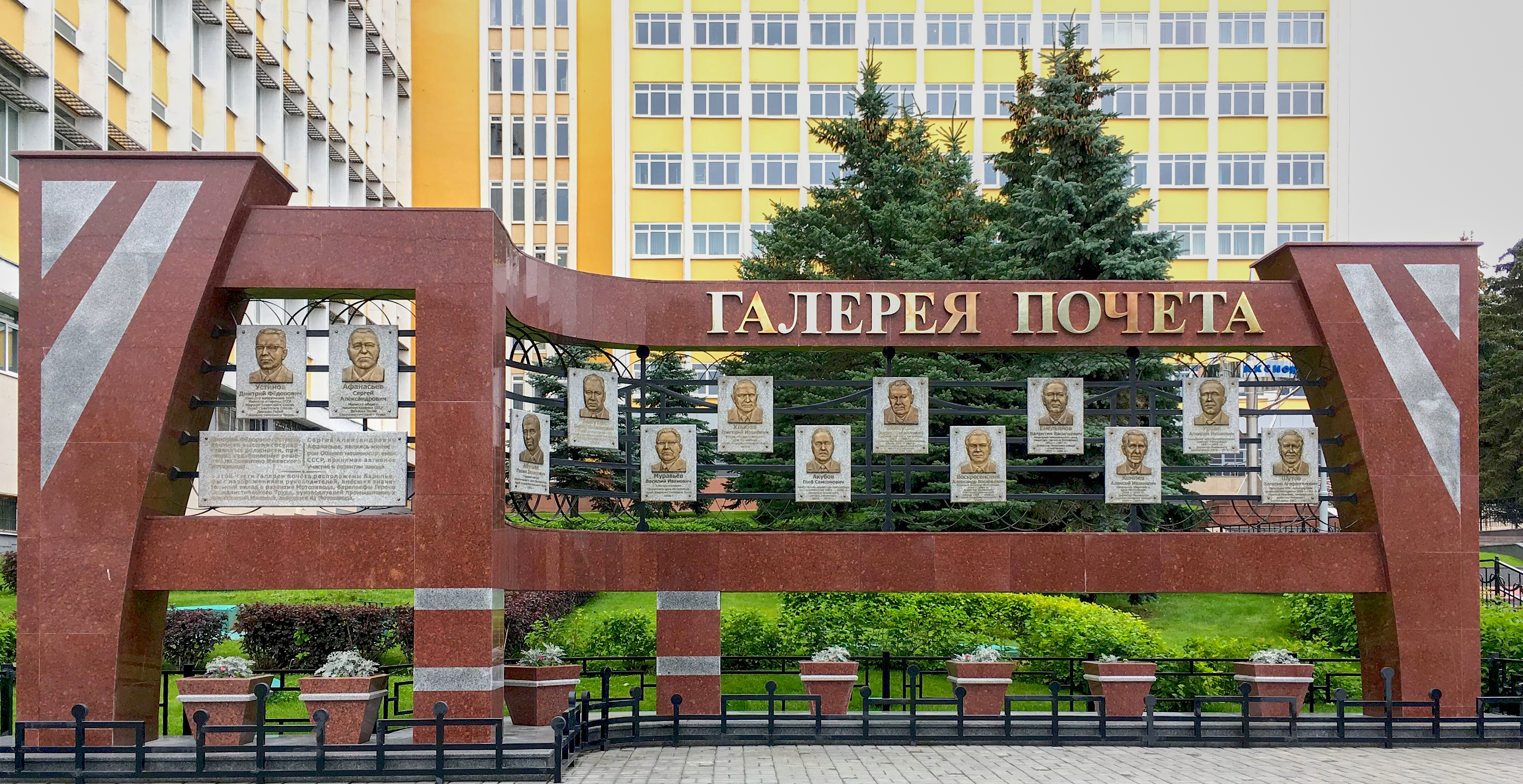
Gallery of honor of the Izhevsk Motor Plant
