= Mariya Goricheva =

Russian actress

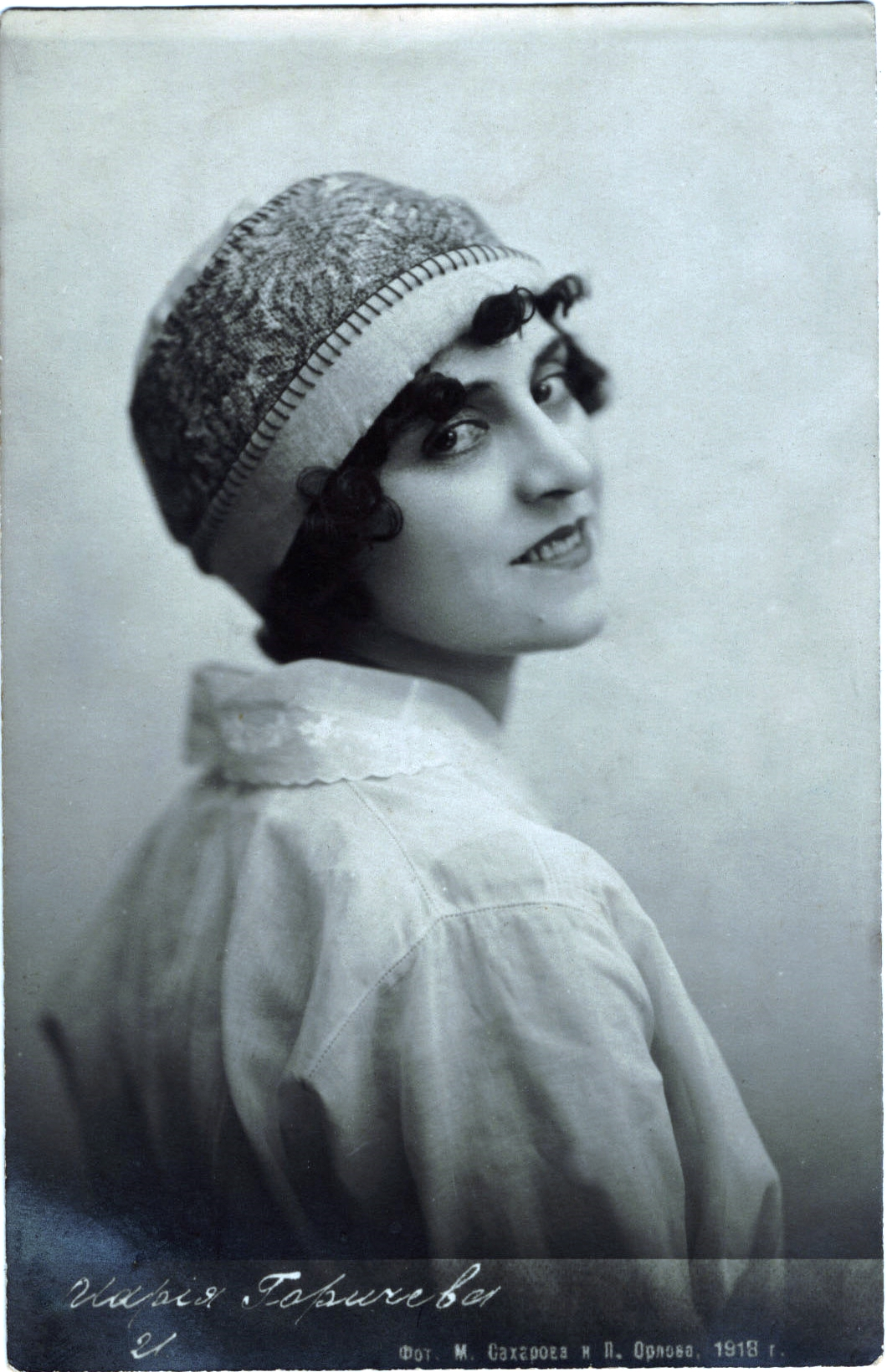
- Born: Mariya Goricheva; 1887
- Died: 1967 (aged 79–80)
- Occupation: Actress
- Years active: 1914–1940

Mariya Goricheva (Russian: Мария Горичева) was a Russian Empire and Soviet film actress.

== Selected filmography ==
- 1916 — Queen of the Dead
- 1918 — Jellyfish Smile
- 1934 — Theft of Sight
- 1936 — Convict
