= Matvei Berman =

Soviet security officer (1898–1939)

- Матвей Берман
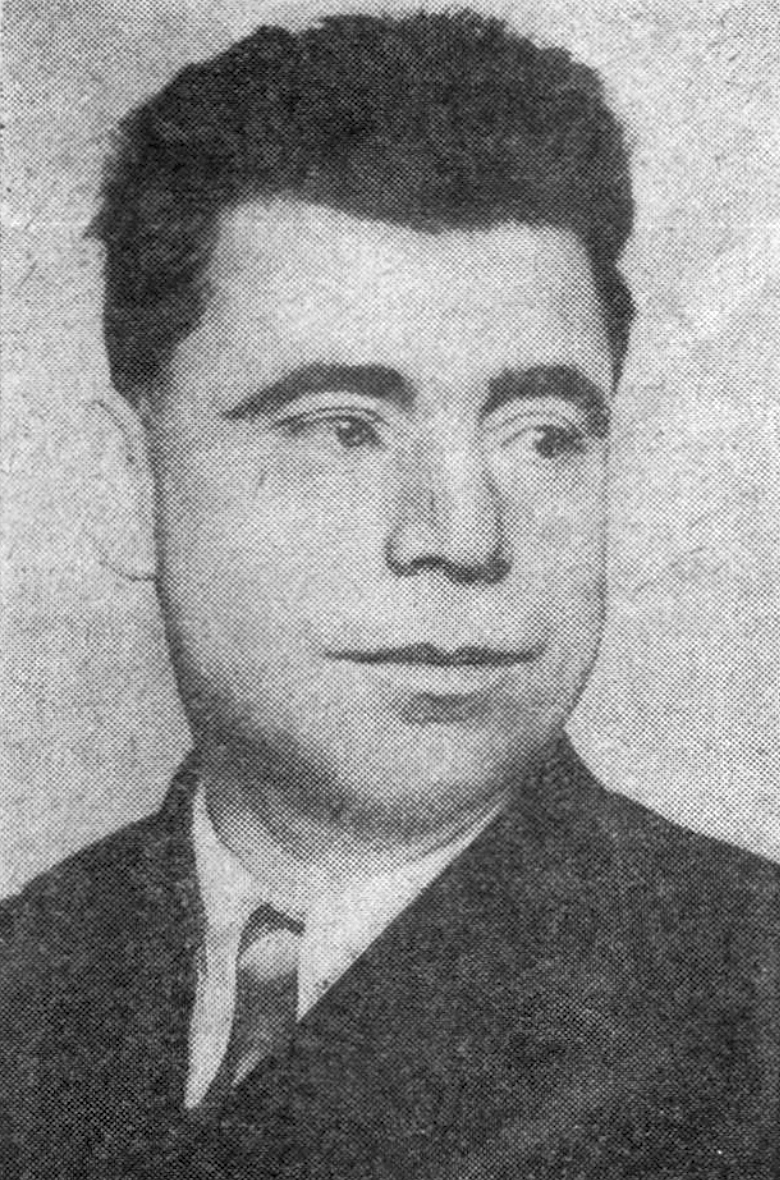
- Berman in 1938

Head of the Gulag
- In office 9 June 1932 – 16 August 1937
- Preceded by: Lazar Kogan
- Succeeded by: Israel Pliner

Personal details
- Born: April 10, 1898 Chita, Russian Empire
- Died: March 7, 1939 (aged 40) Kommunarka shooting ground, Moscow Oblast, Soviet Union
- Cause of death: Execution by shooting
- Party: Communist Party of the Soviet Union (1918–1938)

Matvei Davidovich Berman (Russian: Матвей Давыдович Берман; April 10, 1898 – March 7, 1939) was a Soviet security officer and the head of the Gulag prison camp system from 1932 to 1937.

== Biography ==
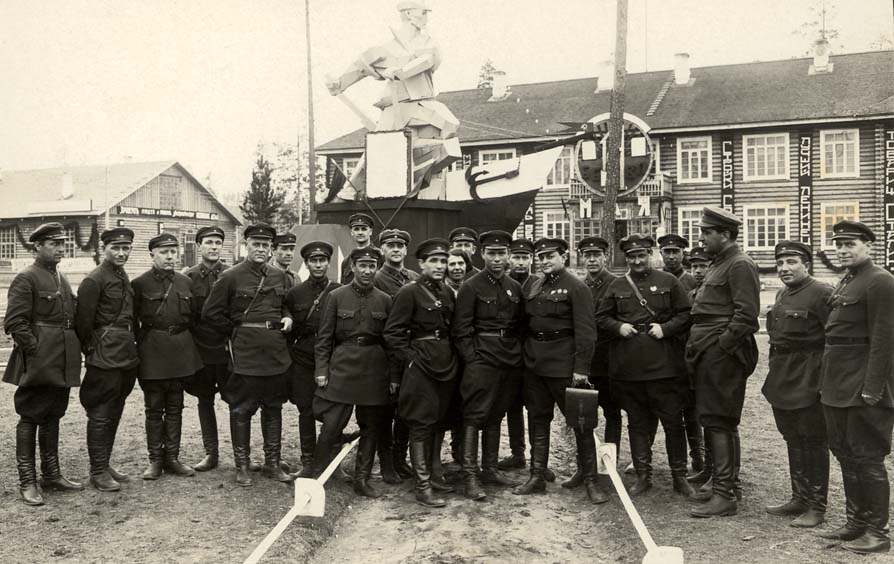
Berman together with GULAG camp chiefs in May 1934

Berman was born in Andiranovka, Chita, Transbaikal Oblast, the son of a Jewish brickyard owner. He joined the Russian army and entered the military school in Irkutsk. He then became a cadet of the 25th Reserve infantry regiment. Berman joined the Bolsheviks in June 1917. In 1918 he joined the Red Army and was stationed in Tomsk. By June he was working in a propaganda unit. In August 1918, Berman joined the Cheka and was named chief of uyezd-level Cheka in the city of Glazov. From 1923 to 1924, he was the People's Commissar for State Security in the Buryat-Mongol Autonomous Soviet Socialist Republic. He then led the OGPU in Central Asia. From February 1927 to October 1927 he was the chairman of the OGPU in the Uzbek Soviet Socialist Republic.

In November 1929 he helped develop the Gulag system of camps and became deputy chief of the Gulag in 1930. From June 9, 1932 to August 17, 1937, he was head of the Gulag. He was awarded the Order of Lenin on August 4, 1933, soon after the completion of the White Sea – Baltic Canal. By 1935, by his own count, Berman was in charge of over 740,000 prisoners working on 15 major projects in the Gulag.

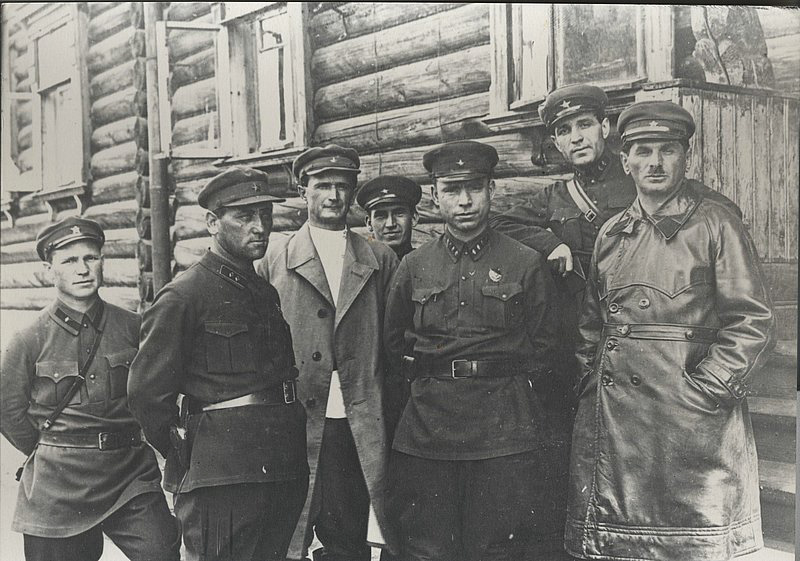
Naftaly Frenkel (far right) at the White Sea–Baltic Canal works in July 1932 during the visit of Matvei Davidovich Berman (front, second from right), head of the Gulag system

After the fall of Genrikh Yagoda, Berman continued to rise in the hierarchy of the NKVD, where he held the offices of head construction of the Moscow–Volga Canal and deputy head of the NKVD in 1936–1937.

In August 1937, Berman's fall began in the time of the Great Terror. On August 17, 1937, he lost his position as head of the Gulag and was appointed People's Commissar of Posts and Telecommunications (Russian: Наркомпочтель). On December 23, 1938, he was expelled from the Soviet Communist Party, arrested the next day in the office of Georgi Malenkov, and sent to prison at Lubyanka. He was found guilty by the Military Collegiate of the Supreme Court of the Soviet Union of belonging to a "terrorist and sabotage organization" and shot on March 7, 1939, at Kommunarka.

On October 17, 1957, Matvei Berman was legally rehabilitated.

== Family ==
- Boris Davidovich Berman, brother of Matvei Berman, a leading First Chief Directorate officer.
- Yuri Berman (1910–2001), second brother, worked for the OGPU/NKVD in Siberia from 1933. He was arrested on 19 July 1939, convicted of fabricating cases against innocent people, and sentenced to death. In 1941, his sentence was commuted to 10 years in prison. After his release, he worked as a middle school teacher.

== Awards ==
- Honorary worker of the Cheka-GPU (V) (1924)
- Order of the Red Banner (1927)
- Order of Red Banner of Labor Uzbek SSR (1927)
- Honorary worker of the Cheka-GPU (XV)
- Order of Lenin (1933)
- Order of the Red Star (1937)

== See also ==
- Outline of the Russian Revolution and Civil War
- Bibliography of the Russian Revolution and Civil War
- Bibliography of Stalinism and the Soviet Union
- Index of Old Bolsheviks
- Index of articles related to the Russian Revolution and Civil War

== Sources ==
- Khlevniuk, Oleg V. (2004). The History of the Gulag. From Collectivization to the Great Terror. New Haven: Yale University Press. p. 418. ISBN 0-300-09284-9.
- К.А. Залесский (KA Zalessky): Империя Сталина. Биографический энциклопедический словарь (Stalin's Empire, Biographical Encyclopedic Dictionary) veche Moskau-Verlag 2000, ISBN 5-7838-0716-8
- Н. В. Петров, К. В. Скоркин (N.V. Petrov, K.V. Skorkin): Кто руководил НКВД, 1934–1941 – Справочник (Who Directed the NKVD, 1934–1941), Swenja-Verlag 1999, ISBN 5-7870-0032-3
