= Moscow Canal =

Waterway in Russia

Coordinates: 56°43′N 37°08′E

- Moscow Canal
- Interactive map of Moscow Canal

Specifications
- Length: 79.6 miles (128.1 km)
- Locks: 8+2+1 (originally 8)
- Maximum height above sea level: 531 ft (162 m)

History
- Former names: Moskva–Volga Canal
- Date completed: 1937

Geography
- Start point: Ivankovo Reservoir
- End point: Moskva (river)

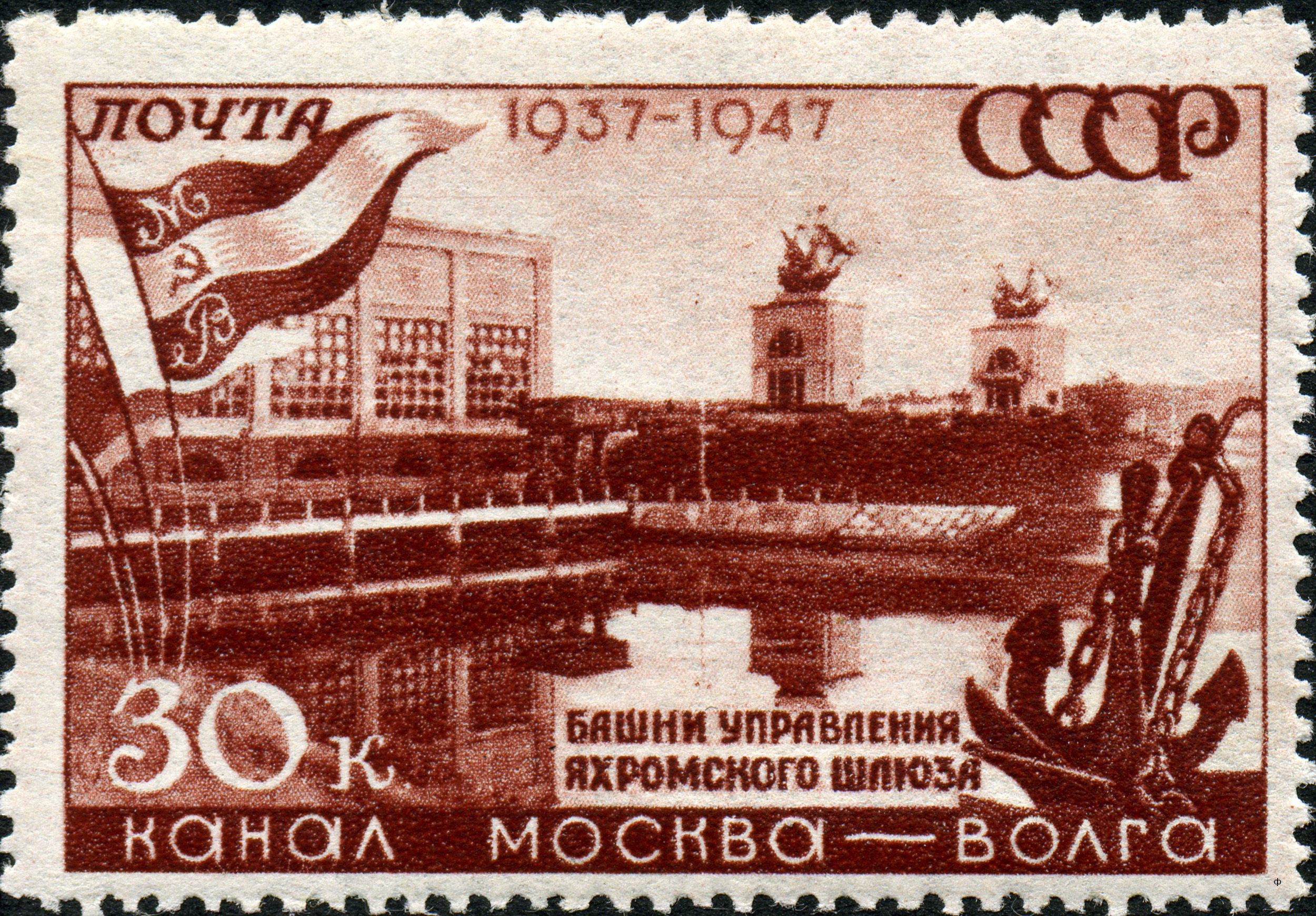
The Moskva–Volga Canal celebrated on a 1947 stamp

The Moscow Canal (Russian: Кана́л и́мени Москвы́), named the Moskva–Volga Canal until 1947, is a canal in Russia that connects the River Moskva with the Volga. It is located in Moscow itself and in the Moscow Oblast. The canal connects to the Moskva River in Tushino (an area in the north-west of Moscow), from which it runs approximately north to meet the Volga River in the town of Dubna, just upstream of the dam of the Ivankovo Reservoir. The length of the canal is 128.1 kilometres (79.6 mi).

It was constructed between 1932 and 1937 by 200,000 gulag prisoners, under direction of the Soviet secret police and Matvei Berman.

== Construction ==
By the early 1930s, Moscow had begun to experience a shortage of drinking and industrial water due to population growth, and the capacity of the Rublevskoye water pipeline did not meet the capital's water needs. On June 15, 1931, the Central Committee of the Soviet Communist Party approved the report of Lazar Kaganovich on the water situation in the capital and other cities, and adopted the recommendation to use the resources of the Volga River, located 120 kilometres (75 mi) north of the capital, for water supply to Moscow, as well as for transportation purposes.

On June 1, 1932, by Resolution No. 859 of the Council of People's Commissars of the USSR, the route of the canal through Dmitrov was approved with the order to "immediately begin construction of the Volga–Moscow water canal"; the labor for only two years were allocated until November 1934. The former head of the OGPU Belomorstroy, Lazar Kogan, was appointed head of construction on June 9, 1932.

On September 14, 1932, by OGPU order No. 889, the Dmitrovsky corrective labor camp was organized, headed by the former chief supplier of the GULAG. Resources from the White Sea–Baltic Canal were transferred to the new administration " Dmitlag ..

The number of prisoners at the canal construction site at one time reached 196,000 people. Igor Kuvyrkov of the Dolgoprudny Historical and Art Museum estimated that more than 600,000 prisoners passed through the canal construction site. Of those, 22,842 deaths associated with work at the Canal were recorded in hospitals, not including people killed at work or who were shot.

On April 17, 1937, the gates were opened and the waters of the Volga began filling the Canal. Construction was completed on July 1, and the Canal was opened at ceremonies on July 14, 1937. On April 14, 1938, at the request of the NKVD, former prisoners who had completed their sentences and voluntarily remained for the construction of the Moscow-Volga Canal and other sites had their convictions expunged.

With the canal, Moscow is connected to Russia's Unified Deep Water System, a large system of canals and rivers in European Russia, which created access to five seas: the White Sea, Baltic Sea, Caspian Sea, Sea of Azov, and the Black Sea. As such, it is sometimes called the "port of the five seas" (Russian: порт пяти морей). Apart from transportation, the canal also provides for about half of Moscow's water consumption, and the shores of its numerous reservoirs are used as recreation zones.

One of the world's tallest statues of Vladimir Lenin, 25-meter (82 ft) high, built in 1937, is located at Dubna at the confluence of the Volga River and the Moscow Canal. The accompanying statue of Joseph Stalin of similar size was demolished in 1961 during the period of de-stalinization.

== World War II ==
During World War II and the Battle of Moscow, the canal played an instrumental role in the defense of Moscow. Wehrmacht plans were to encircle the city from the north and south. To prevent this, water was pumped from the canal and reservoirs into the surrounding plains.

== Dimensions ==
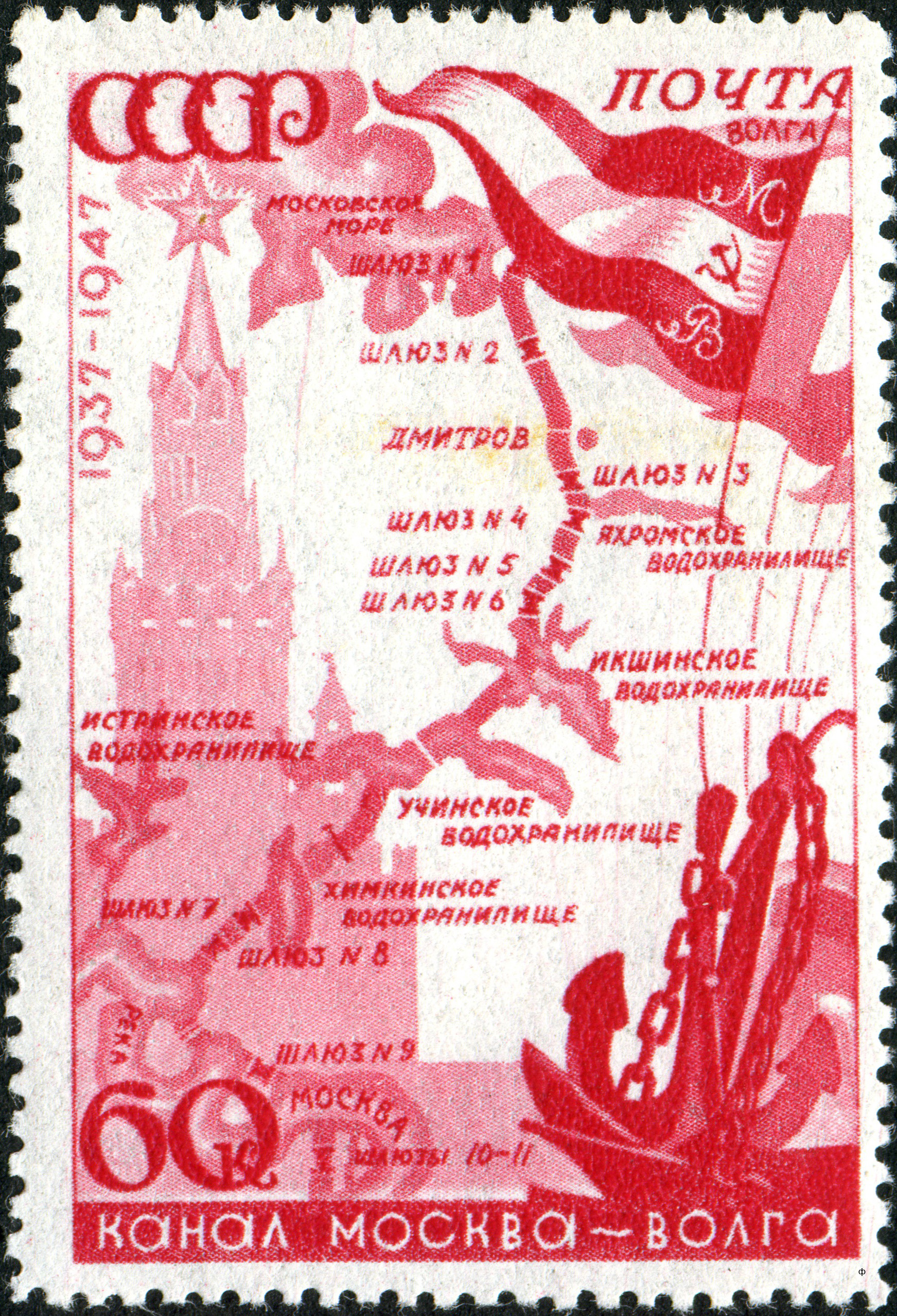
Map of the canal on a 1947 postage stamp

The minimum depth of the canal is 5.5 metres (18 ft), and its lock dimensions are 290 by 30 metres (951 by 98 ft).

== Gallery ==
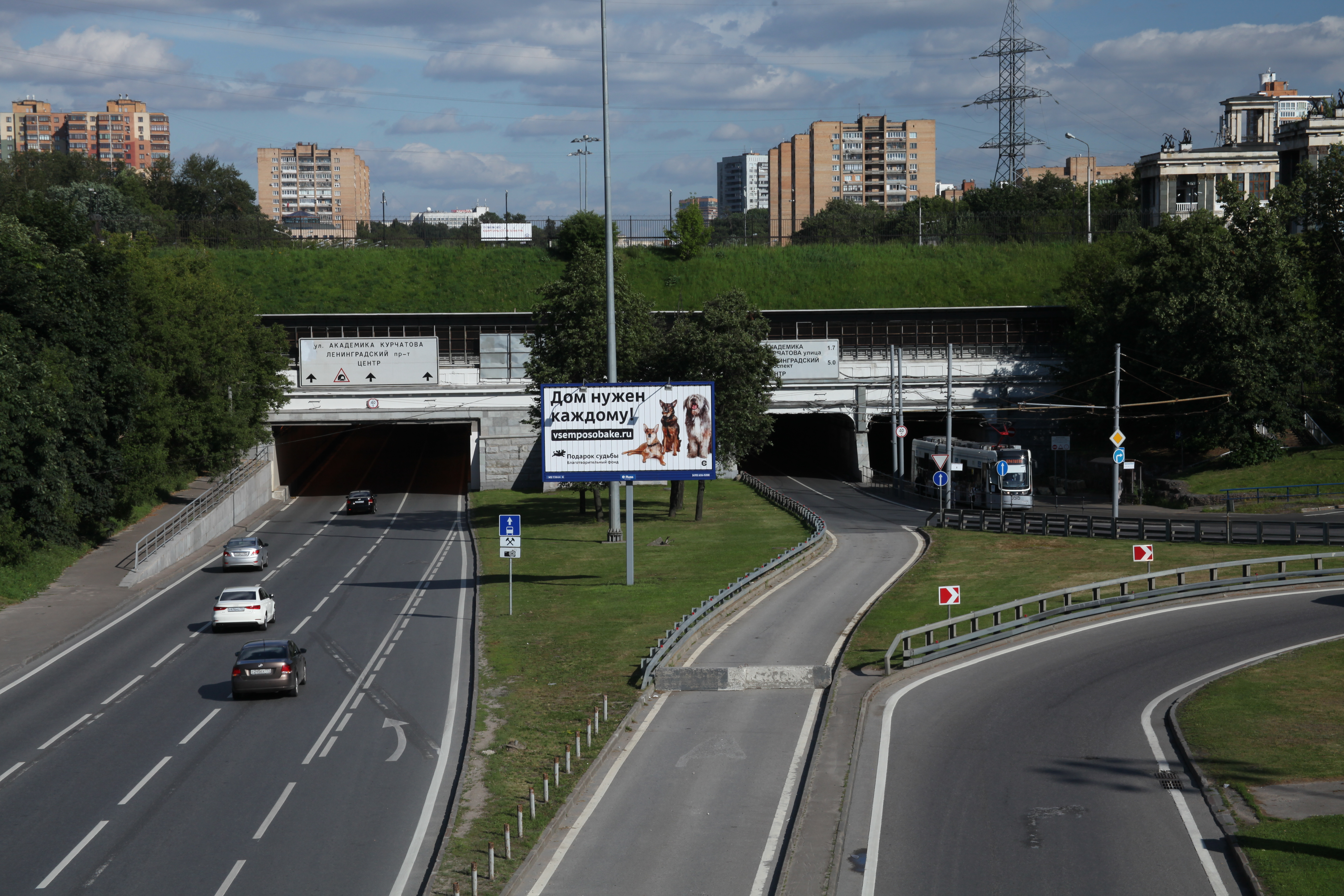
Tushino tunnel lies under the Moscow Canal

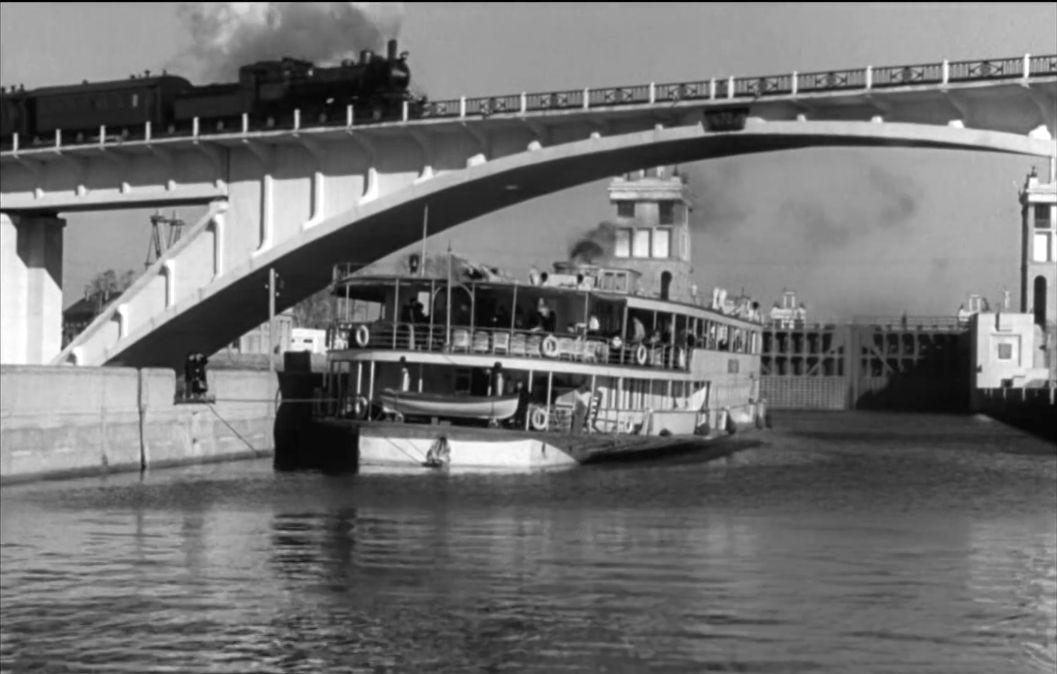
Bachelis Bridge on Moscow Canal from Volga-Volga movie

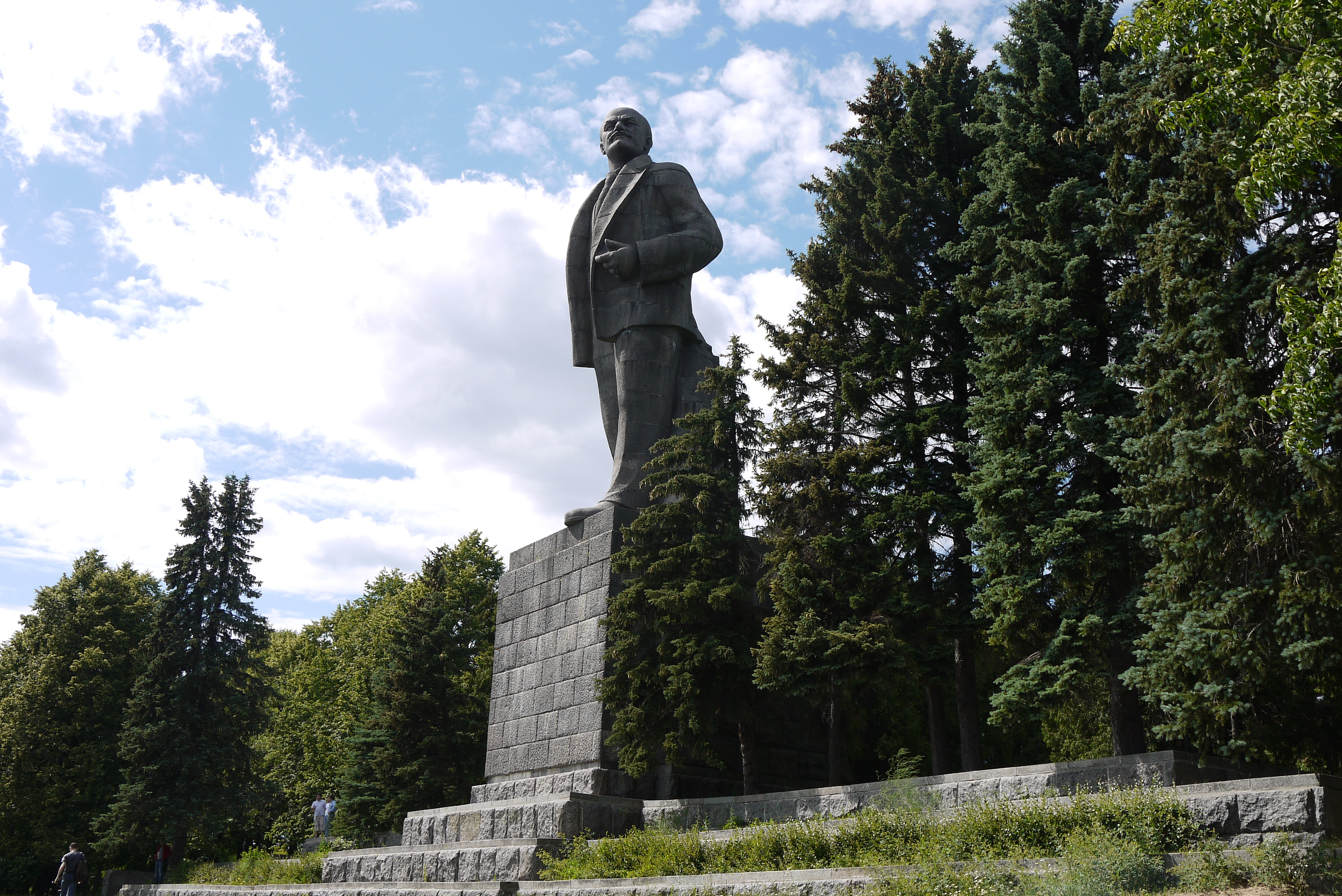
Statue of Lenin at Dubna

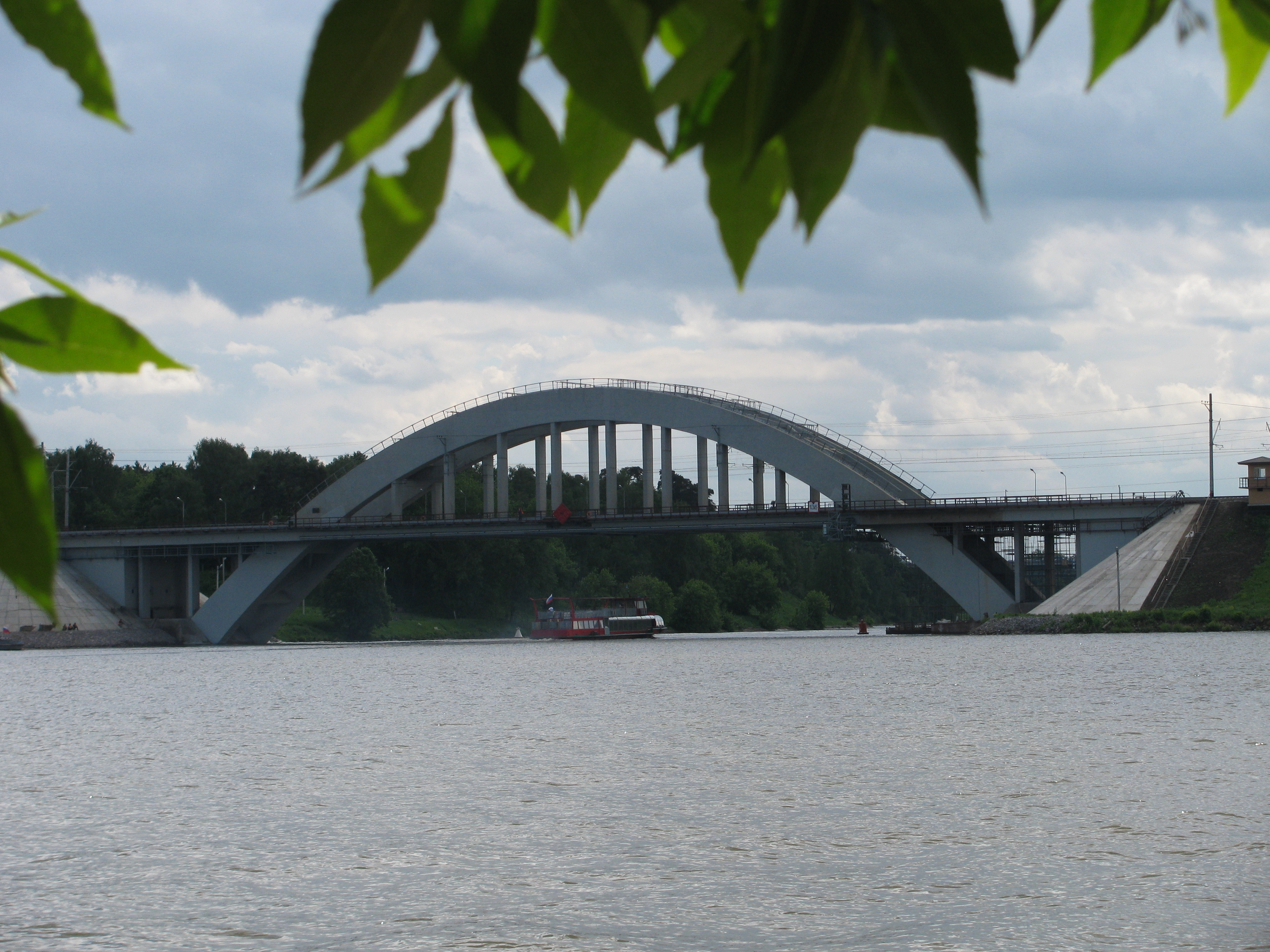
Khimki railway bridge

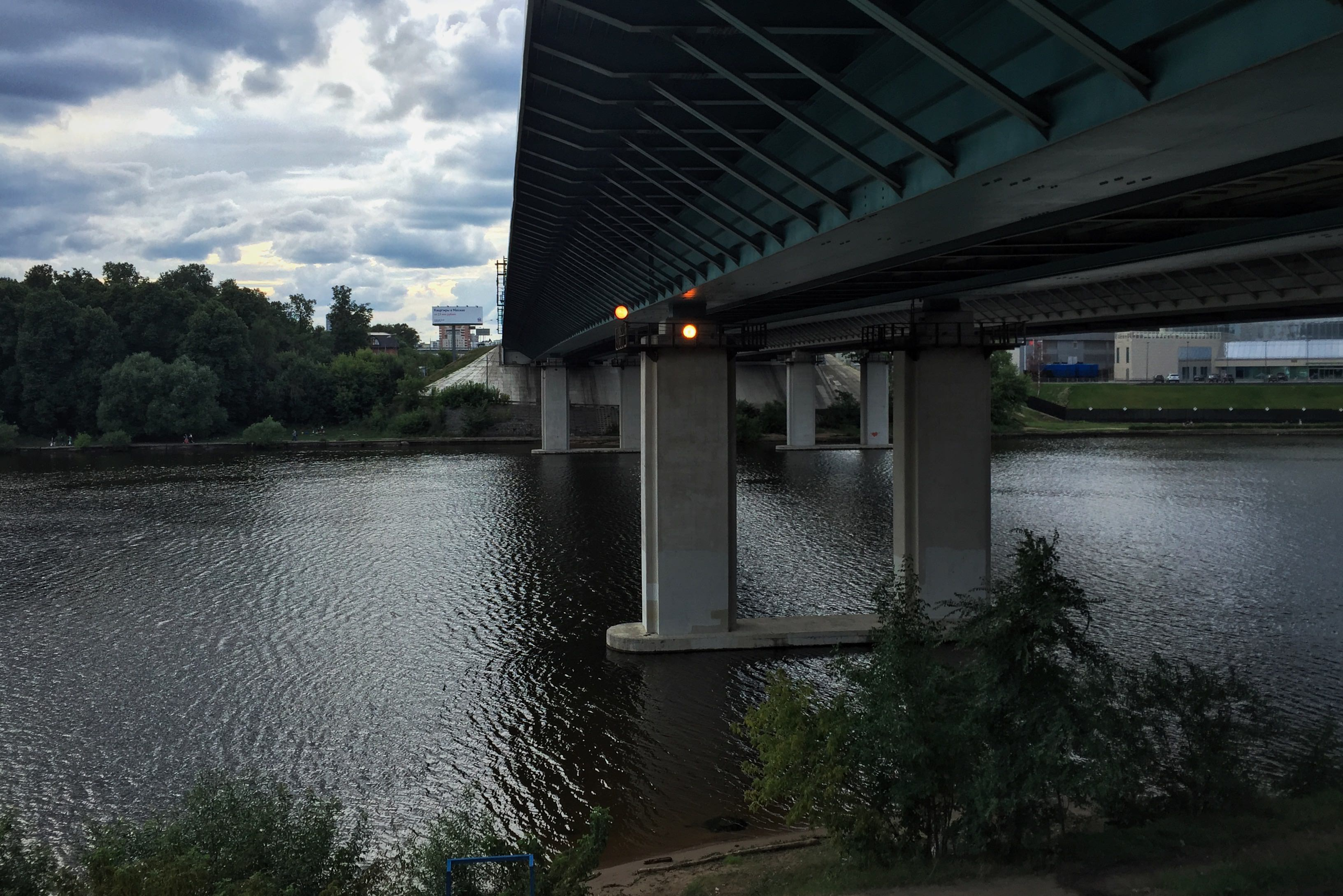
Khimkinsky bridge, Moscow
