= Potapy Emelianov =

Russian clergyman and Eastern Catholic martyr (1889–1936)

Servant of God
- Born: 1889; Ufa Governorate, Russian Empire
- Died: 14 August 1936 (aged 46–47); Nadvoitsy, Karelian ASSR, Russian SFSR, USSR
- Venerated in: Roman Catholic Church, Russian Greek Catholic Church
- Feast: 14 August

Potapy Emelianov Потапий Емельянов (c. 1889, Ufa Governorate, Russian Empire – 14 August 1936, Nadvoitsy, Segezhsky District, Karelian ASSR, USSR) was a Russian clergyman and Eastern Catholic martyr under Stalinism.

Pyotr Emelianov was born and raised in a family of Priestless Old Believers, who were received by Bishop Antony Khrapovitsky. As a special protege of Khrapovitsky, Emelianov followed him, first to Volhynia and then to Kharkiv. Emelianov eventually became a monastic priest, or Hieromonk, of the Pochaiv Lavra, and took the monastic name of Potapy.

Following the Russian Revolution, Emelianov was received by Exarch Leonid Feodorov into the Russian Greek Catholic Church and communion with the Holy See along with his entire Old Ritualist parish, which was located at Nizhnaya Bogdanovka, near Kadiivka in the Luhansk Oblast of modern Ukraine, in 1918. He was subjected three times to flogging at the insistence of local Orthodox priests, arrested repeatedly by the armies of multiple political factions during the Russian Civil War, and, after having refused to renounce his "Jesuit politics", narrowly escaped summary execution by General Anton Denikin's anti-communist White Army. After subsequently being released when Starobielsk was captured by the Red Guards, Fr. Potapy returned immediately to his parishioners and wrote in a letter to a fellow priest, "Do not worry that they persecute and torment us; we stand firmly upon the Rock of Peter."

During the subsequent Soviet anti-religious campaign, Emelianov was arrested by the Soviet secret police for his religious beliefs and ministry. He was declared guilty of espionage, based on having gathered and shared information about local religious persecution with his superiors, who had then shared it with the western news media, and "bribing peasants to convert to Catholicism", based on his previous role in helping to distribute food and medical supplies sent by Fr Edmund A. Walsh's joint American and Papal humanitarian missions during the Russian famine of 1921. Following nearly a decade of slave labor in the Gulag, including first felling trees above the Arctic Circle at Solovki prison camp and then digging Joseph Stalin's notorious White Sea–Baltic Canal, Potapy Emelianov died at Nadvoitsy in Soviet Karelia.

Since 2003, Potapy Emelianov has been under investigation for possible sainthood as one of what Fr. Christopher Zugger has termed, "The Passion bearers of the Russian Catholic Exarchate". Potapy's current title is Servant of God.

== Early life ==
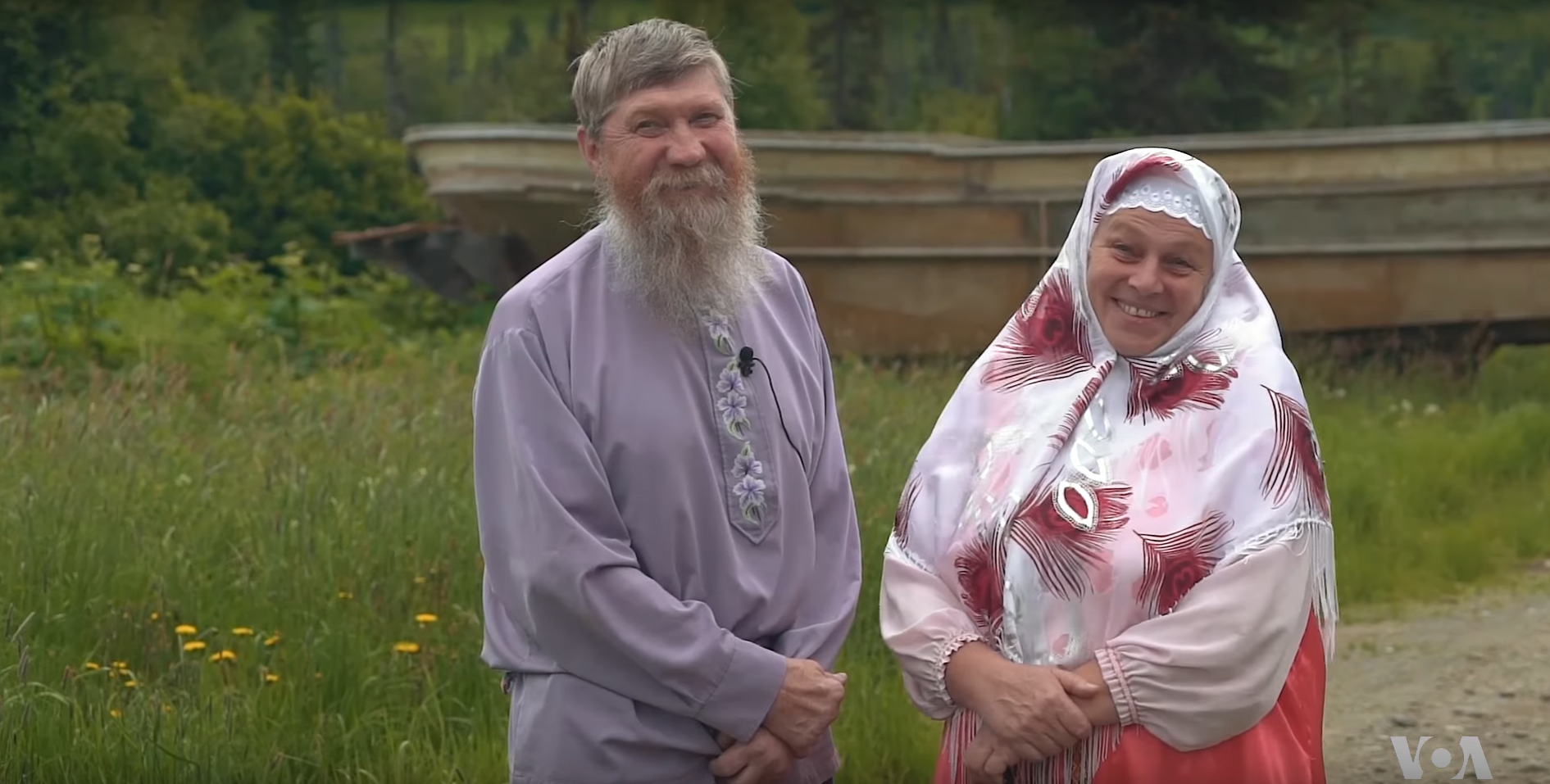
Two Old Believer sectarians in traditional dress from Nikolaevsk, Alaska.

Pyotr Andreevich Emelianov was born in Ufa Governorate around 1889 into a peasant family of Bezpopovtsy, or Priestless Old Believers. His ancestors had left the Russian Orthodox Church in the mid-17th-century, over the liturgical reforms introduced by Patriarch Nikon of Moscow and Tsar Alexis of Russia, who both enforced conformity in vain using excommunication, Siberian internal exile, torture, and even burning at the stake for heresy. In about 1901, a nine year old Pyotr and his family were received into the Russian Orthodox Church as Edinovertsy, or Old Ritualist Orthodox, by the Bishop of Ufa and Menzelinsk, Anthony (Khrapovitsky).

When Kyr Anthony was named Bishop of Volhynia in 1902, he brought the young Pyotr Emilianov with him. He was tonsured at the Pochaiv Lavra, the monks of which are famous for their anti-Catholicism, by the Bishop, and took the monastic name of Potapy. Although a monk, Brother Potapy was briefly conscripted into the Imperial Russian Army, but was released for reasons of ill-health, and was sent by his Bishop to study for the Orthodox priesthood at Zhitomir.

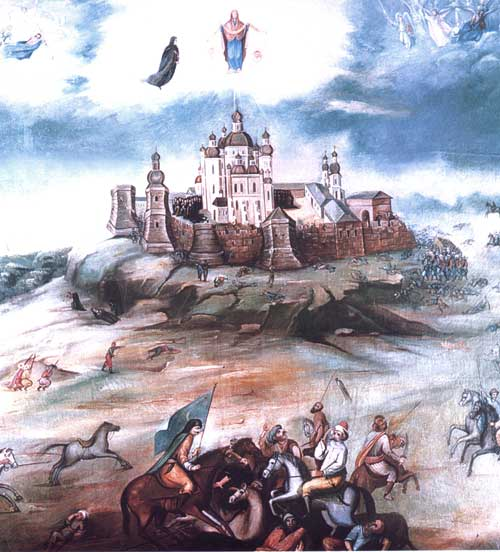
A view of the still Greek-Catholic Pochaiv Lavra during the early 1800s.

According to Deacon Vasili von Burman, "During his pastoral studies in Zhitomir, the monk Potapy became fascinated by the writings of the Holy Fathers of the Church and the proceedings of the Ecumenical Councils. He was struck most forcibly by the testimony of the Holy Fathers supporting the supremacy of the Roman Pontiff. In this way young Potapy gradually became possessed by the idea of reunion with Rome."

Zhitomir was the location of St Sophia's Cathedral and still remains today one of the main population centers of both Roman Catholicism and Poles in Ukraine. Even so, Deacon Vasili von Burman continues, "Until this time, Potapy had never in his life met a single Catholic; consequently there could be no question of Catholic influence on him from any external source."

In 1911, Potapy finished his course and was ordained to the priesthood as a hieromonk for the Pochaiv Lavra.

In 1916, Kyr Anthony Khrapovitsky became Archbishop of Kharkov. In March 1917, Father Potapy was assigned to serve temporarily at the Old Ritualist Orthodox parish of ethnic Russians at Nizhnaya Bogdanovka, near Lugansk in modern Ukraine. The Russians in the village had been transplanted there in the 17th century, as an outpost against the Islamic Khanate of Crimea.

According to Pavel Parfentiev, "Fr. Potapy gained the love of the town at once. His perfect knowledge of the liturgical services and his fine sermons attracted people from the other parishes and even from other villages." In response, the parishioners asked the Bishop to assign Fr. Potapy to them permanently, alleging that their regular Pastor was, "idle and lazy". The Bishop agreed to their request.

== Conversion to Catholicism ==
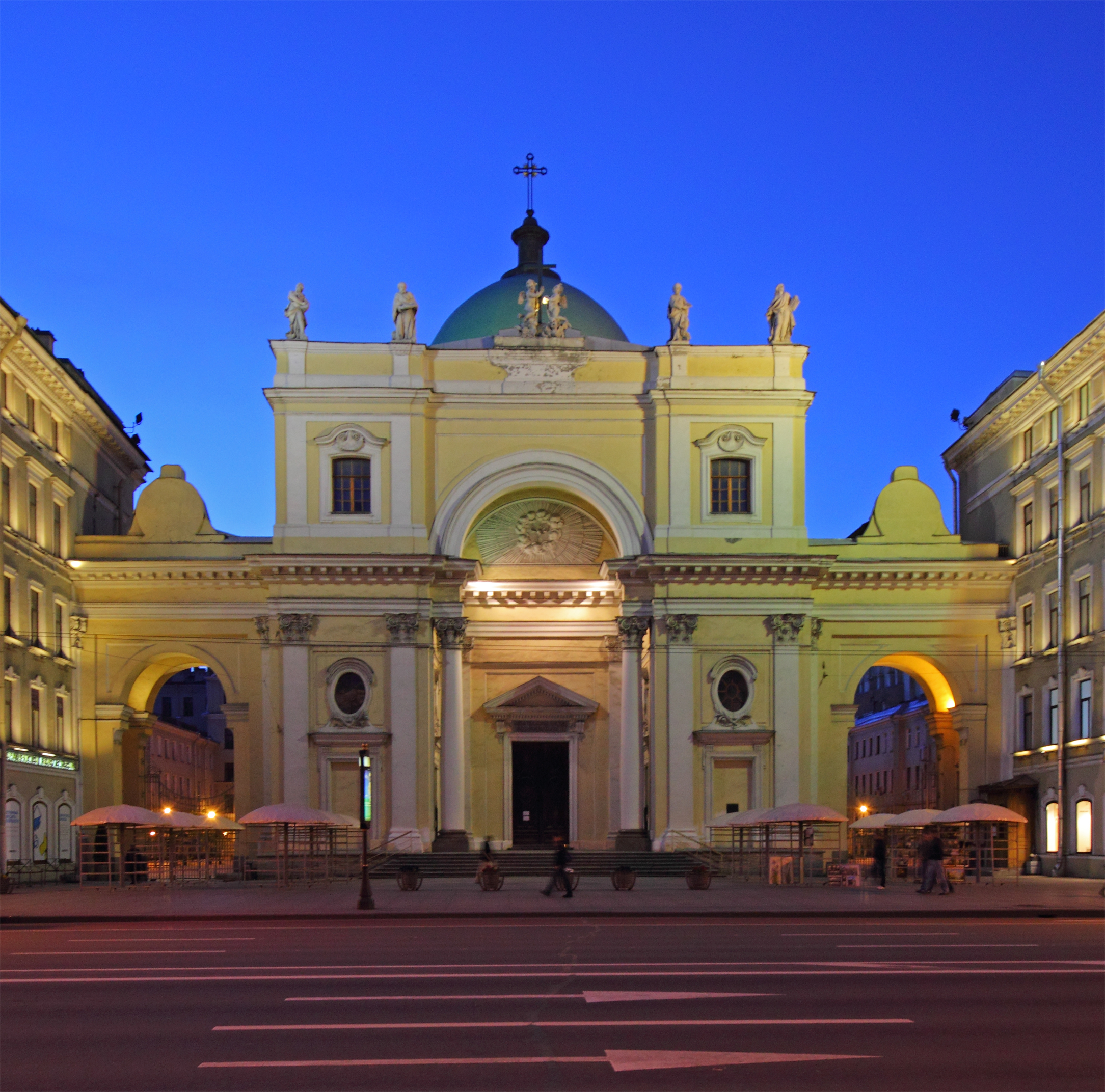
St. Catherine's Roman Catholic Church on Nevsky Prospect, St. Petersburg.

As a preacher, Fr. Potapy told his parishioners about the lives of the Roman Pontiffs, including Leo and Gregory the Great, who are also venerated as Saints in the Russian Orthodox Church.

By 1918, Fr. Potapy Emelianov had become convinced that true Orthodoxy could not be had except through Communion with the Holy See and had convinced the majority of his parishioners of the same belief.

Seeking to be formally received, Fr. Potapy travelled to Lugansk and met with Fr. Mikhail Yagulov, an ethnic Georgian and pastor of the only Roman Catholic parish in the city. Fr. Yagulov received Fr. Potapy cordially and urged him to submit his request to Fr. Anton Kwiatkowski, the Regional Dean of Kharkov.

It was in Kharkov that Fr. Potapy learned that, after the 1917 February Revolution, Metropolitan Andrei Sheptytsky had formed an Exarchate for Russian Rite Catholics, and assigned Fr. Leonid Feodorov as the Exarch.

After a month long journey that involved crossing between German and Bolshevik lines, Fr. Potapy Emelianov arrived in Petrograd and met with the Exarch, Leonid Feodorov, whom he found living in the Rectory of St. Catherine's Roman Catholic Church on Nevsky Prospect. After questioning him closely over several days and making several recommendations, on June 29, 1918, Exarch Feodorov received Fr. Emelianov's Profession of Faith inside St. Catherine's, after which the latter joined him in offering the Byzantine Rite Divine Liturgy.

Before Fr. Potapy returned to Boganovka, Exarch Feodorov informed him that Ukraine had been excluded from the Russian Catholic Exarchate and that his parish was therefore subject to Metropolitan Andrey Sheptytsky. Exarch Feodorov promised, however, to soon send Fr. Gleb Verkhovsky to visit Bogdanovka in his name.

Fr. Potapy later wrote, "When I returned to the parish with the Catholic blessing of the Exarch, and with his commission and message, and read it aloud after a sung Moleben, the spiritual joy and the tears knew no bounds, because the message was filled with the warmest fatherly love and exhortation."

When asked many years later why he had become a Catholic, Fr. Potapy responded, "The basic principle of my soul is not to oppose itself to the truth."

== Persecution ==
Emelianov and his parishioners underwent severe harassment and violent persecution from the Imperial German Army, the Red Guards and the White Army during the Russian Civil War.

=== Second Hetmanate ===
During his absence in St. Petersburg, local Orthodox clergy had attempted to convert his parishioners back to Orthodoxy. When Fr. Potapy returned after these efforts failed, Orthodox priests approached the occupying troops of the Imperial German Army and accused Fr. Potapy of being a spy for the Soviet secret police, or CHEKA. In response, a mixed force of German soldiers and those from the Ukrainian People's Army of Pavlo Skoropadskyi's Hetmanate invaded Bogdanovka in a punitive expedition and subjected both Fr. Potapy and his parishioners to flogging.

During the second such flogging expedition, Father Potapy was injured so badly that he had to be brought to the hospital in Luhansk. He was visited there by Fr. Mikhail Yagulov, who afterwards visited and explained to senior officers in the Imperial German Army the real reasons for the recent accusations against Fr Potapy. In response, the last Kaiser's military granted Fr Potapy a safe conduct upon his release and prevented further punitive expeditions as long as German occupation of the region lasted.

On 25 September 1918, Bishop Neophyte, the assistant to the Archbishop of Kharkiv, arrived in Nizhnaya Bogdanovka with a force of fifty soldiers of the Ukrainian People's Army. Most Old Ritualist Greek Catholics of the village fled, while those who remained listened as the Bishop, with tears in his eyes, pleaded with them to return to the Russian Orthodox Church.

In reply, the villagers said, "In our pastor's eyes we saw not only tears, but blood, caused by the floggings done at your orders." They then knelt down before the Bishop and said, "Please, leave us alone with our convictions and our pastor."

=== Russian Civil War ===
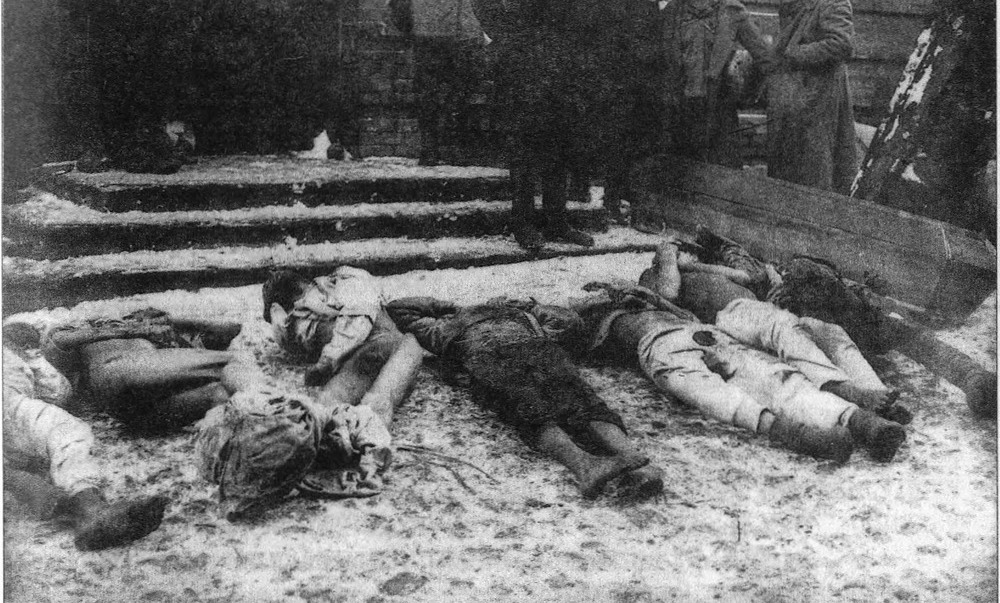
Bodies of prisoners in Bakhmut poisoned by General Anton Denikin's troops, 1919

When Bogdanovka was occupied by the anti-communist Volunteer Army of General Anton Denikin in September 1919, Fr. Potapy was arrested and incarcerated for three months.

During his imprisonment at Starobielsk, a White Army Procurator, who believed that the Catholic Church in Ukraine had, "ensnared", Fr. Potapy, demanded that the priest renounce his, "Jesuit politics". Fr. Potapy replied, "I follow no earthly politics. I wish only to help spread the knowledge of the Tsardom of Jesus Christ and to show the Rock upon which it is founded to those who wish to enter it. If you choose to call this Jesuit politics, that is your affair. I would simply tell you that this is the command of Christ our Tsar. If it became necessary to suffer and if the Lord gave me strength, I would not only not renounce this position, I would agree to affirm it a thousand times with my blood. This is my goal and this is what I am committed to and if you choose to call this politics, do as you please."

During his imprisonment, Fr. Potapy alone was exempted at the last moment from a prisoner transfer that would have meant certain death. All of prisoners in the transfer were subsequently shot without trial as part of the ongoing White Terror, officially while attempting to escape. On December 23, 1919, Starobielsk was again occupied by the Red Guards, who released everyone who had been imprisoned under General Denikin.

In a letter written after his release to a fellow priest, Fr. Potapy recalled, "My appearance there seemed to them like a resurrection from the dead. Tears of joy flowed uncontrollably. It was as if everyone, young and old, had to touch me to be convinced that I was really alive, since they had long since been assured that I no longer existed." Later in the same letter, Fr. Potapy added, "Do not worry that they persecute and torment us; we stand firmly upon the Rock of Peter."

== Soviet anti-religious persecution ==
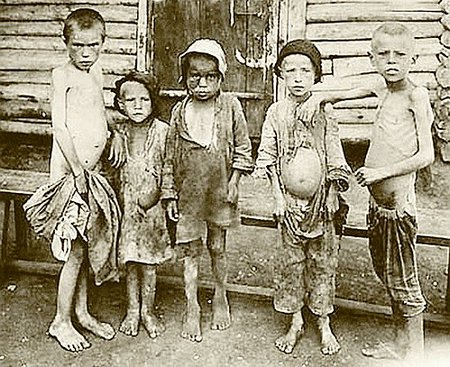
Starving children in 1922

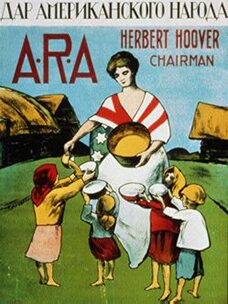
1921 American Relief Administration poster saying "The Gift of the American People" in Russian

Of his work in assisting the joint Vatican and American relief missions led by Fr. Edmund A. Walsh in distributing food, clothing, and medical supplies to the many starving in the region during the Russian famine of 1921–1922, Fr. Potapy later recalled, "In 1922, a Papal mission arrived in the USSR and one of its representatives was in Rostov. From him, I periodically received material assistance, not only in money, but also in the form of food and clothing."

On May 3, 1922, the People's Commissariat of Justice granted Father Potapy and his parishioners a church. At the time, the Old Ritualist Greek Catholic parish at Nizhnaya Bogdanovka consisted of 828 members.

On January 27, 1927, Father Potapy was arrested and, in a search of his rectory, GPU agents found letters from Pie Eugène Neveu, A.A., formerly the parish priest of the mining town of Makiivka, Ukraine, who had been secretly consecrated as a Bishop by Michel d'Herbigny in 1926 and installed in the Church of St. Louis des Français as the secret Apostolic Administrator for Moscow Oblast. These letters were used to charge Father Potapy with "counterrevolutionary activity." Father Potapy's distribution of money, food, and clothing during the 1921 famine was interpreted as bribing local peasants to convert to Catholicism. Until his arrest, Father Potapy was the last priest of the Russian Greek Catholic Church still living as a free man in the USSR.

An official indictment was presented to Father Potapy on August 20, 1927. In addition to allegedly bribing Orthodox peasants to convert to Catholicism, Father Potapy also stood accused of anti-Soviet agitation.

On September 12, 1927, a special decree of the OGPU Collegium sentenced Father Potapy to 10 years in the GULAG. On March 24, 1928, the sentence was given a sharper edge, "Amnesty in the case of Emelyanov, Potapy Andreevich, is not permissible."

== In the Gulag system ==
=== At Solovki ===
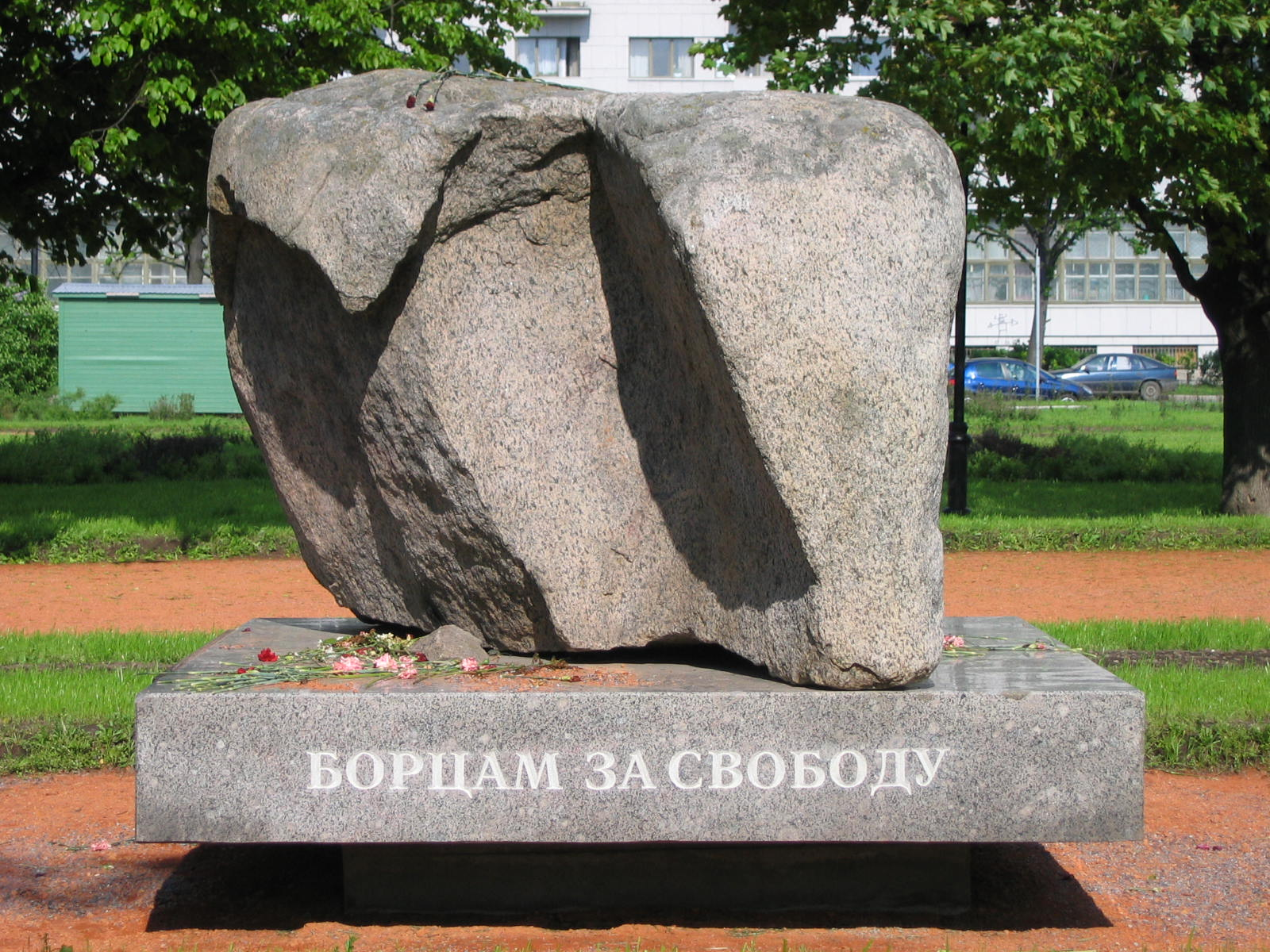
Memorial to the Victims of Political Repression in the USSR, in St. Petersburg, made out of a boulder taken from the Solovetsky Islands.

On September 23, 1928, Fr. Potapy Emelianov arrived at Solovki prison camp as part of a shipment of prisoners dispatched from Butyrka prison in Moscow. In surviving documents from the camp, Fr. Potapy's educational background is summarized as "a pupil of the monks". His ideology was described with the words, "According to him, he has no political views."

The concentration camp at Solovki, which were located in the White Sea above the Arctic Circle on the islands and buildings of a famous Medieval Monastery, has since been dubbed, "The First Camp of the Gulag."

Upon his arrival, Father Potapy was held with other priests, who included Roman Catholic priests, fellow priests of the Russian Greek Catholic Church led by Exarch Leonid Feodorov, and priests of the Servites of the Immaculate Conception of the Georgian Greek Catholic Church led by Exarch Shio Batmanishvili. Upon his arrival, Father Potapy was warmly greeted by the Exarch Leonid and the other imprisoned Greek Catholics, but he also befriended imprisoned Polish Roman Catholic priests, "for many of whom he later became a source of hope and support."

According to Deacon Vasili von Burman, "At that time, when the camp seemed a spiritual desert, a place of depression and even despair, the Catholic priests led a fruitful life in their closed circle... Observing them, one could not help but comprehend what an important part religion played in people's lives; how in inspired them. In the context of existence on Solovki this stood out with particular clarity... On Sundays and Feast Days, services were held in the Germanovsky chapel and it was, for all its poverty, a place of celebration."

In response, however, to escalating diplomatic protests and publicity given to religious persecution in the USSR by the Holy See, the Chekist guards on Solovki cracked down on the Catholic prisoners with a vengeance. Beginning on January 19, 1929, the use of the Germanovsky chapel for religious services was forbidden, all religious books and artifacts were confiscated from Catholic prisoners, and the Catholics of Solovki were reduced to what Irina Osipova was termed, "a catacomb existence".

=== Anzer Island ===
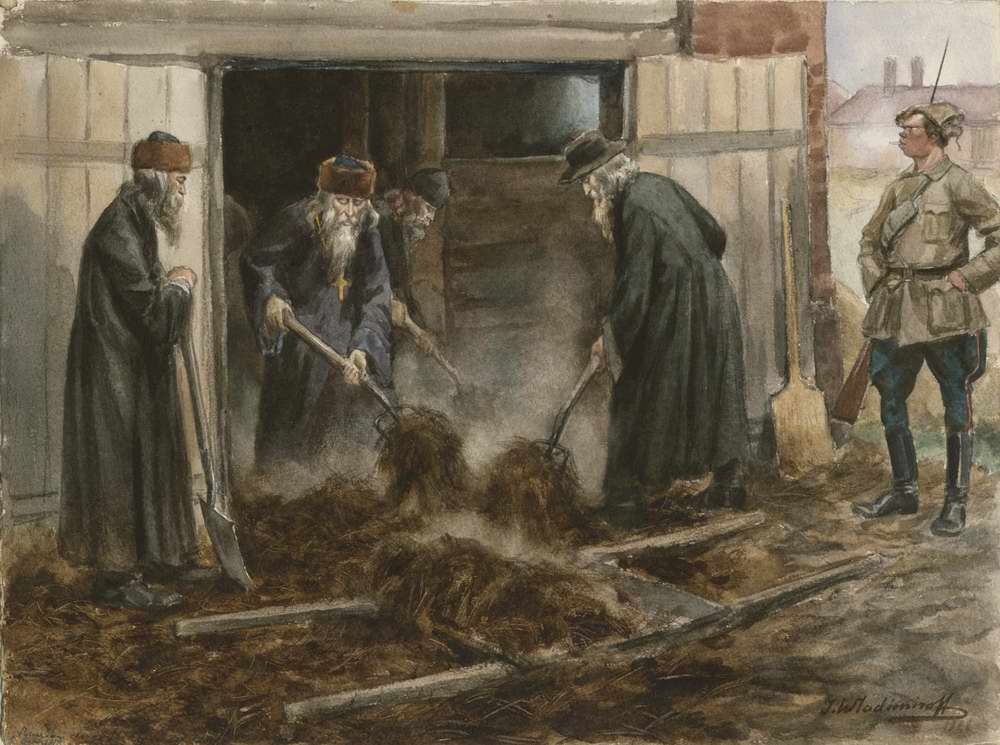
"Russian clergy on Forced Labor" by Ivan Vladimirov.

In early 1929, along with other Catholic priests, Father Potapy was transferred to Trinity Monastery Penal Detachment, a prison camp located on nearby Anzer Island, where, according to Anne Applebaum, "prisoners worked felling trees with no respite, no breaks, and little food." The commandant of one Anzer Island camp, a Chekist named Ivan "Vanka" Potapov, regularly showed new arrivals at the camp a heap of human hands and feet that his prisoners had severed in a vain quest for a little rest. Potapov also boasted that he had killed more than 400 prisoners with his own hands.

According to Irina Osipova, "On Anzer Island the Catholic Clergy were housed in separate barracks and even at work were permitted no contact with other convicts."

Despite this, Father Potapy and his fellow priests secretly obtained the necessities for saying Mass and continued to carry out secret religious worship. When Fr. Felix Liubczynski, a dying Roman Catholic priest formerly stationed in the village of Kushelevka, in the Gaysinsky Uyezd of modern Ukraine, was moved to the camp infirmary, Father Potapy, who was also in the infirmary, helped lighten his colleague's last days.

Fr. Donat Nowicki, a Russian Greek Catholic priest of Polish ethnicity, later recalled, "To Fr. Felix's distress, his ward orderly was deliberately callous, denying him even the most basic aid. Fr. Potapy, aiming to relieve, as far as possible, the plight of his poor sick brother, secured his own transfer to the same ward and cared for the patient like a mother... Fr. Potapy was an excellent conversationalist and raconteur. His conversation offered more than a little comfort to Fr. Felix and lightened his last days. Observing that the end was approaching, Fr. Potapy reminded the sick man of confession, with a touching concern that gave the latter some moments of profound happiness. After confession, Fr. Felix repeatedly kissed his [benefactor's] hands, holding them in his own for a long time."

After Fr. Liubczynski's death on November 17, 1931, Fr. Potapy immediately offered a Greek Catholic funeral service, or Panikhida, which he knew by heart. Fr. Potapy and his fellow Catholic priests then successfully overcame seemingly impossible obstacles to build a coffin and give Fr. Felix Liubczynski a decent Christian burial within the GULAG.

=== Letter and aftermath ===
After his release from the infirmary in December 1931, Father Potapy rejoined his fellow priests on Anzer Island. In addition to giving each other both moral and spiritual support, however, the priests on Anzer Island also sought to inform the Polish Red Cross and the Polish Foreign Ministry of the conditions under which they were being held.

Early in 1932, a letter written on Anzer Island by Fr. Adolf Filipp successfully reached the Second Polish Republic and was published in the Polish press. The letter read, "We, Catholic priests and almost all elderly or sick, are often forced to undertake the heaviest labor, as, for example, excavating trenches to build foundations, hauling great rocks, digging at the frozen ground in winter... We sometimes have to be outside on duty for 16 hours a day in winter, without a break and with no shelter... After heavy work we absolutely require a lengthy rest period but in our accommodation the space per man is at times reduced to less than one sixteenth of the volume of air a human being needs to survive."

In the summer of 1932, Father Potapy was one of 23 priests arrested as part of the GPU's investigation and prosecution of, "The anti-Soviet counterrevolutionary organization of Catholic and Uniate Clergy on Anzer Island."

The defendants all stood accused of the, "creation of an anti-Soviet group that conducted anti-Soviet agitation, clandestinely celebrated Mass and religious rites and maintained an illegal contact with a free worker for purposes of transmitting abroad information of an espionage character about the situation of Catholics in the USSR."

During interrogation, Fr. Potapy said: "In this place, I have become an even more committed Catholic and nothing can shake me." As a result, the GPU decided to punish Father Potapy with complete isolation from all other prisoners.

At the end of the investigation in November 1933, the eight priests deemed most culpable in the letter were shipped to the GPU in Leningrad Fr. Potapy and all the other defendants were transferred to the White Sea–Baltic Canal project, which Simon Sebag Montefiore has dubbed, "a 227-kilometre canal begin in December 1931 and completed by the Pharaonic slavery of 170,000 prisoners, of whom around 25,000 died in a year and a half. Voroshilov later praised Kirov and Yagoda for their contributions to this crime."

== Death ==
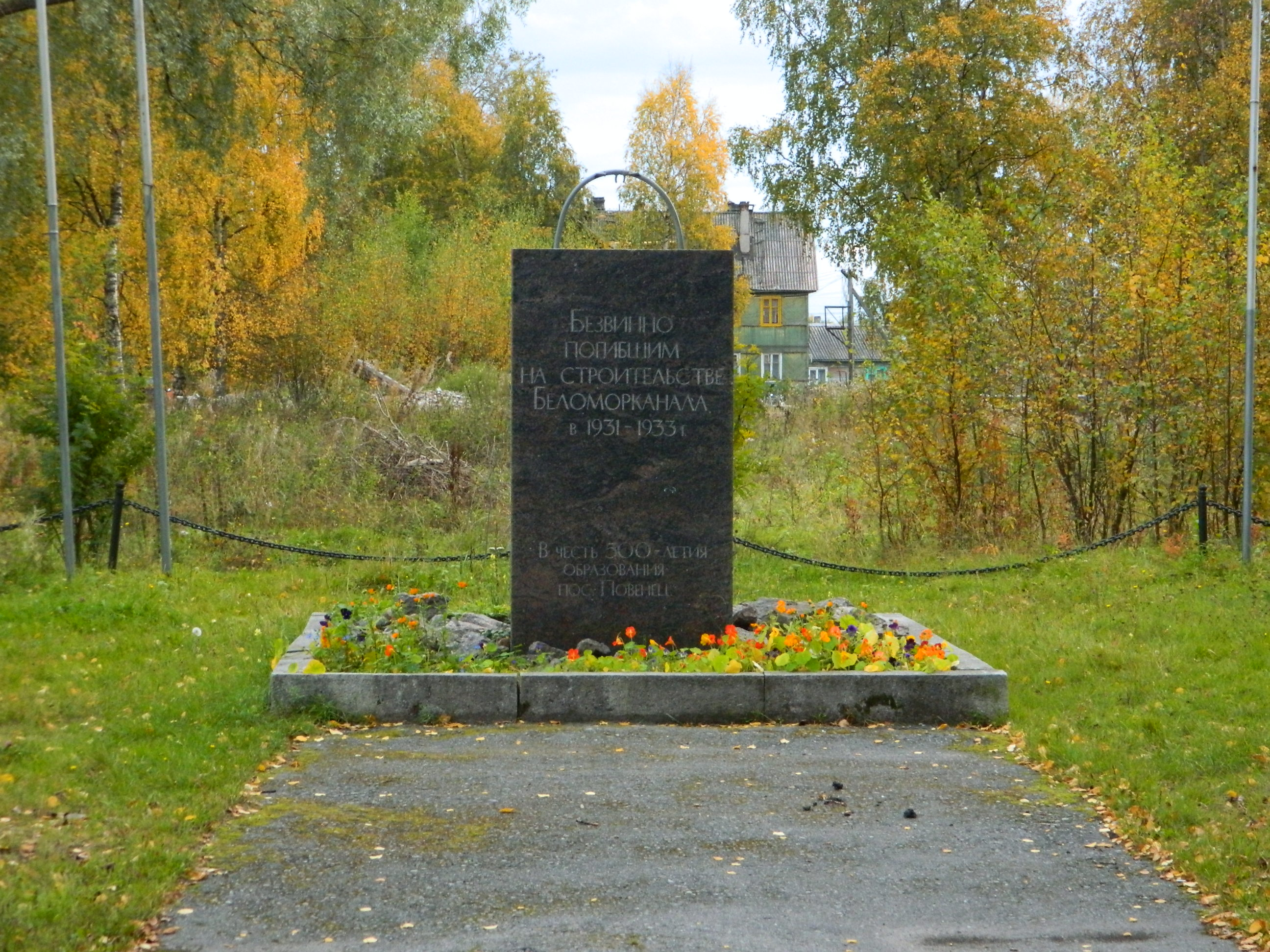
The memorial at Povenets to the Gulag inmates who died during the building of the White Sea–Baltic Canal.

On August 4, 1936, Fr. Potapy Emelianov, who had been one of the slave laborers who remained to run the canal after its completion, was finally released from the Gulag and sentenced to internal exile. He died on August 14, 1936, allegedly at Podvoitsy, which Fr. Paul Mailleux has described as, "a stop on the Murmansk railroad." Pavel Parfentiev, the former Postulator for his Sainthood cause, gives Father Potapy's place of death instead as the still extant railroad station at Nadvoitsy, but adds that, if he was buried, the location of his grave remains unknown.

== Legacy and beatification ==
Emelianov is greatly venerated among Russian Catholics. In 2003, a positio towards the Causes for Beatification of six of what Fr. Christopher Zugger has termed, "The Passion bearers of the Russian Catholic Exarchate": Fabijan Abrantovich, Anna Abrikosova, Igor Akulov, Potapy Emelianov, Halina Jętkiewicz, and Andrzej Cikoto; was submitted to the Holy See's Congregation for the Causes of Saints by the Bishops of the Catholic Church in Russia.

In June 2021, the Bishops of the Catholic Church in Russia announced, as part of a restructuring of the ongoing investigations and due to a delay in receiving necessary documents from Major Archbishop Sviatoslav Shevchuk of the Ukrainian Greek Catholic Church, that Fr. Potapy Emelianov's Beatification Cause has been moved to the back burner.
