= Segezhsky =

Segezhsky (masculine), Segezhskaya (feminine), or Segezhskoye (neuter) may refer to:

- Segezhsky District, a district of the Republic of Karelia, Russia
- Segezhskoye Urban Settlement, a municipal formation which the town of Segezha in Segezhsky District of the Republic of Karelia is incorporated as
- Segezha Pulp and Paper Mill (Segezhsky), a pulp and paper company in the Republic of Karelia, Russia
