= Segezha (disambiguation) =

Segezha is a town in the Republic of Karelia, Russia.

Segezha may also refer to:

- Segezha River (Karelia), a river in the Republic of Karelia, Russia, which flows into Lake Vygozero
- Segezha (Leningrad Oblast), a river in Leningrad Oblast, Russia, a tributary of the Svir
- Starship Segezha in the Doctor Pavlysh cycle by Kir Bulychev
- Segezha Group, Russian forestry holding company, part of Sistema conglomerate
- Segezha Pulp and Paper Mill, Karelia
