= Nadvoitsy (inhabited locality) =

Nadvoitsy (Russian: Надвоицы) is the name of several inhabited localities in Segezhsky District of the Republic of Karelia, Russia:

- Nadvoitsy, an urban locality (an urban-type settlement)
- Nadvoitsy (rural locality), a rural locality (a village)

== See also ==
- Pristan Nadvoitsy, a rural locality (a station) in Segezhsky District of the Republic of Karelia
