= Nadvoitsy =

Urban-type settlement in the Republic of Karelia, Russia

Nadvoitsy Надвоицы
- Urban-type settlement
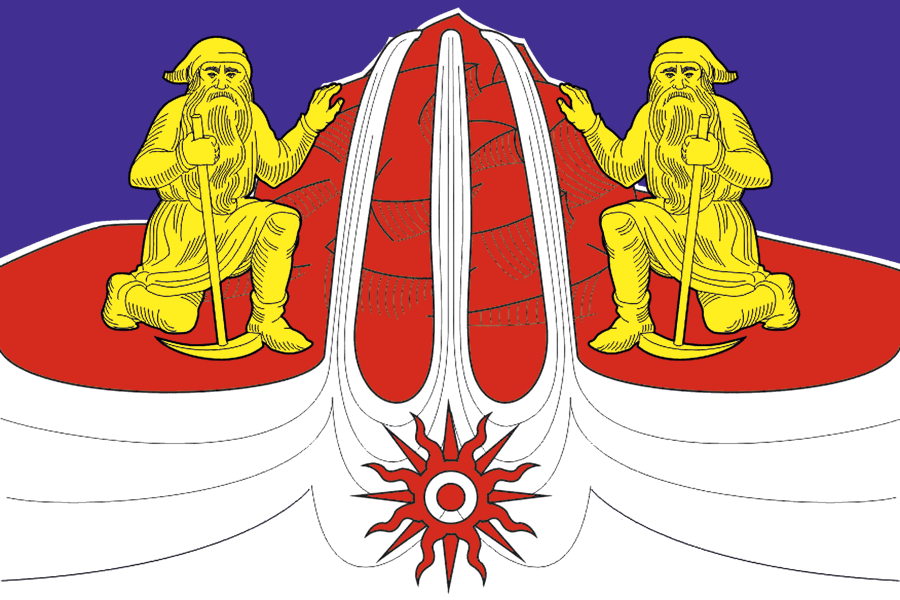
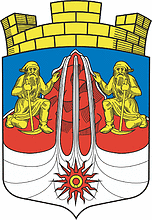
- Flag Coat of arms
- Interactive map of Nadvoitsy
- Location of Nadvoitsy Nadvoitsy (Karelia)
- Coordinates: 63°54′N 34°15′E
- Country: Russia
- Federal subject: Republic of Karelia
- Administrative district: Segezhsky District
- Urban-type settlement status since: 1942

Population (2010 Census)
  - Total: 8,372
  - Estimate (2025): 5,763 (−31.2%)

Municipal status
  - Municipal district: Segezhsky Municipal District
  - Urban settlement: Nadvoitskoye Urban Settlement
  - Capital of: Nadvoitskoye Urban Settlement
- Time zone: UTC+3 (UTC+03:00)
- Postal codes: 186430, 186431
- OKTMO ID: 86645160051

Nadvoitsy population
- 2010 Census: 8,372
- 2002 Census: 11,073
- 1989 Census: 11,514
- 1979 Census: 10,655

Nadvoitsy (Russian: Надво́ицы; Karelian: Vojačču; Finnish: Vojatšu) is an urban locality (an urban-type settlement) in Segezhsky District of the Republic of Karelia, Russia, located on the shore of Lake Voitskoye, 287 kilometers (178 mi) north of Petrozavodsk, the capital of the republic. As of the 2010 Census, its population was 8,372.

== Geography ==
Nadvoitsy is located on the Maynavolok peninsula and the southwestern shore of Lake Voitskoye, through which the river Vyg (Nizhny Vyg) flows from Lake Vygozero in the south. The tenth lock of the White Sea Canal is located near the settlement.

== History ==
Nadvoitsy was first mentioned in 1620 as a possession of the Solovetsky Monastery. In the mid-18th century, a copper and gold mine existed in the area.

The Kirov Railway was built through Nadvoitsy in 1916. Between 1929 and 1930, a section of the Solovki prison camp was located in the settlement, and in 1930, a logging enterprise was established. Nadvoitsy was granted the status of urban-type settlement in 1942.

== Administrative and municipal status ==
Within the framework of administrative divisions, the urban-type settlement of Nadvoitsy is subordinated to Segezhsky District. As a municipal division, Nadvoitsy, together with six rural localities, is incorporated within Segezhsky Municipal District as Nadvoitskoye Urban Settlement. Aside from Nadvoitsy itself, the municipality includes the rural localities of Dubrovo, Kamenny Bor, the village of Nadvoitsy, Posyolok pri 10 shlyuze BBK, Pristan Nadvoitsy and Verkhny. With the exception of Dubrovo and the village of Nadvoitsy, the localities are officially counted as part of the urban-type settlement.

== Economy ==
=== Industry ===
Until 2013, the only enterprise in Nadvoitsy was the Nadvoitsy Aluminum Plant which belonged to the Rusal group. In 2013, the aluminum production became unprofitable, and the plant stopped operation, with the prospective of being scrapped. Most of the population in Nadvoitsy is unemployed.

=== Transport ===
There is a railway station on the railway connecting Petrozavodsk and Murmansk, with infrequent passenger traffic.

== Famous residents ==
- Potapy Emelianov, (c.1889-1936), priest of the Russian Greek Catholic Church, Gulag survivor, and, since 2003, a candidate for Canonization.
