= Vladimir Dluzsky =

Priest Of Russian Catholic Church

Archpriest Vladimir Dluzsky (Dlusskiy) (1895 in Saint Petersburg, Russian Empire – 1967 in West Berlin) was a priest of the Russian Catholic Church of the Byzantine Rite, a member of the Russian apostolate and a leader of the Russian diaspora.

== Biography ==
Vladimir Dluzsky was born into a Russian noble family of orthodox religion. At the end of the Russian Cadet Corps course he entered the Saint Petersburg State University.

Since 1920 Dluzsky remained in exile, first in Turkey, where there was the Jesuit mission in Constantinople, where he met Russian Catholic priest Gleb Verhovskiy, who interested him in Catholicism. After that he moved to Greece and then to Czechoslovakia, graduating from the Law Faculty of Charles University in Prague.

In 1925 Dluzsky converted to Catholicism, and studied with the Benedictines in the seminary of Saint Basil in Lille (Lille), graduating in 1931. In 1929 he was ordained a deacon, a priest in 1930, and was later elevated to the rank of archpriest. From 1931 he headed the Russian Catholic mission in Berlin, succeeding priest Dmitriy Kuz'min-Karavaev.

Dluzsky founded the Society of Saint Nicholas, and paid attention to the church library. Having established close contacts with the prior Pavel Grechishkin, the Russian Catholic priest in Vienna, he became co-editor and co-editor of the magazine Our Parish (newsletter).

During the coming to power of National Socialism, his patriotism caused concern. In 1943 Dluzsky was arrested by the Gestapo. After World War II he continued service in West Berlin. Among his parishioners were some widows of German citizens who were married back in 1914–1918. Learn about pastoral work from a 1957:

"Our faithful - all Galicians left without a pastor, and only a very small number of Russian Poles non negatively to the Byzantine rite".

Father Matthew Dietz was working in West Germany at the time. He had arrived in West Berlin to help Father Dluzsky.

Since 1959 Dluzsky lived at Saint Joseph's Hospital in West Berlin. He died in 1967.

== Works ==
- Dluzsky Vladimir priest. Memory EF Shestochenko / Russia and the Universal Church, 1955, No. 2 (26). S. 18.
- It's the same. Verbal and mental prayer / Our Parish (newsletter). 1938, No. 4. with. 1 - 5., 1939, No. 1. pp. 1 – 4.
- It's the same. Letter from Berlin: Chronicle / Our Parish (newsletter). Vienna-Berlin. 1938, No. 1. C. 1.; No. 2. pp. 1 – 4.
- It's the same. To familiarize the West with the Eastern rite Catholics / Russia and the Universal Church . 1957, No. 5 (37). C. 2

== Sources ==
- Our Parish (newsletter). Vienna-Berlin. 1932, No. 2. with. 1., 1938, No. 4. with. 9 - 10.
- Puzin I. Field reports / Blagovest . Part 1, January–March 1930. with. 158.
- Russian in Germany / Our Parish (newsletter). Vienna. 1938, No. 1. with. 4.
- Russian Catholics in Berlin / Our Parish (newsletter). Vienna. 1937, No. 1 (5). with. 20 - 21.
- Chronicle Berlin arrival / Our Parish (newsletter). 1938, No. 2. with. 8 - 10.; No. 3. with. 9 - 10.; No. 4. with. 8 - 9, 10., 1939, No. 1. with. 9 - 10, 11 - 18.

== Notes ==
- Dlusskiy V., Fr., To familiarize the West with the Eastern rite Catholics / Russia and the Universal Church . 1957, No. 5 (37). S. 23.
