= Bohdanivka, Luhansk Oblast =

Bohdanivka Богданівка
- Village
- Interactive map of Bohdanivka
- Location of Bohdanivka within Ukraine Bohdanivka (Ukraine)
- Coordinates: 48.603611°N 38.73°E
- Country: Ukraine
- Oblast: Luhansk Oblast
- Raion: Alchevsk Raion
- Hromada: Kadiivka urban hromada
- Founded: 1957

Area
  - Total: 0.46 km^{2} (0.18 sq mi)
- Elevation: 106 m (348 ft)

Population (2001 census)
  - Total: 71
  - Density: 150/km^{2} (400/sq mi)
- Time zone: UTC+2 (EET)
  - Summer (DST): UTC+3 (EEST)
- Postal code: 93723
- Area code: +380 6473

Bohdanivka (Ukrainian: Богданівка; Russian: Богдановка) is a village in Kadiivka urban hromada, Alchevsk Raion (district), Luhansk Oblast (region), Ukraine, at about 45 km WbN from the centre of Luhansk city.

The ancestors of the ethnic Russians in the village were transplanted there during the 17th-century, to build a fortified outpost against raids by Tatars from the Khanate of Crimea.

The settlement was taken under control of pro-Russian forces during the War in Donbass, that started in 2014. It is administered as a part of the de facto Luhansk People's Republic.

== People ==
- Fr. Potapy Emelianov (c. 1889-1936), local Old Ritualist priest of the Russian Greek Catholic Church and martyr in the Gulag. Under investigation since 2003 for possible Roman Catholic Sainthood.
