= Pie Eugène Neveu =

The Most Reverend Pie Eugène Neveu AA
- Titular Bishop of Citrus
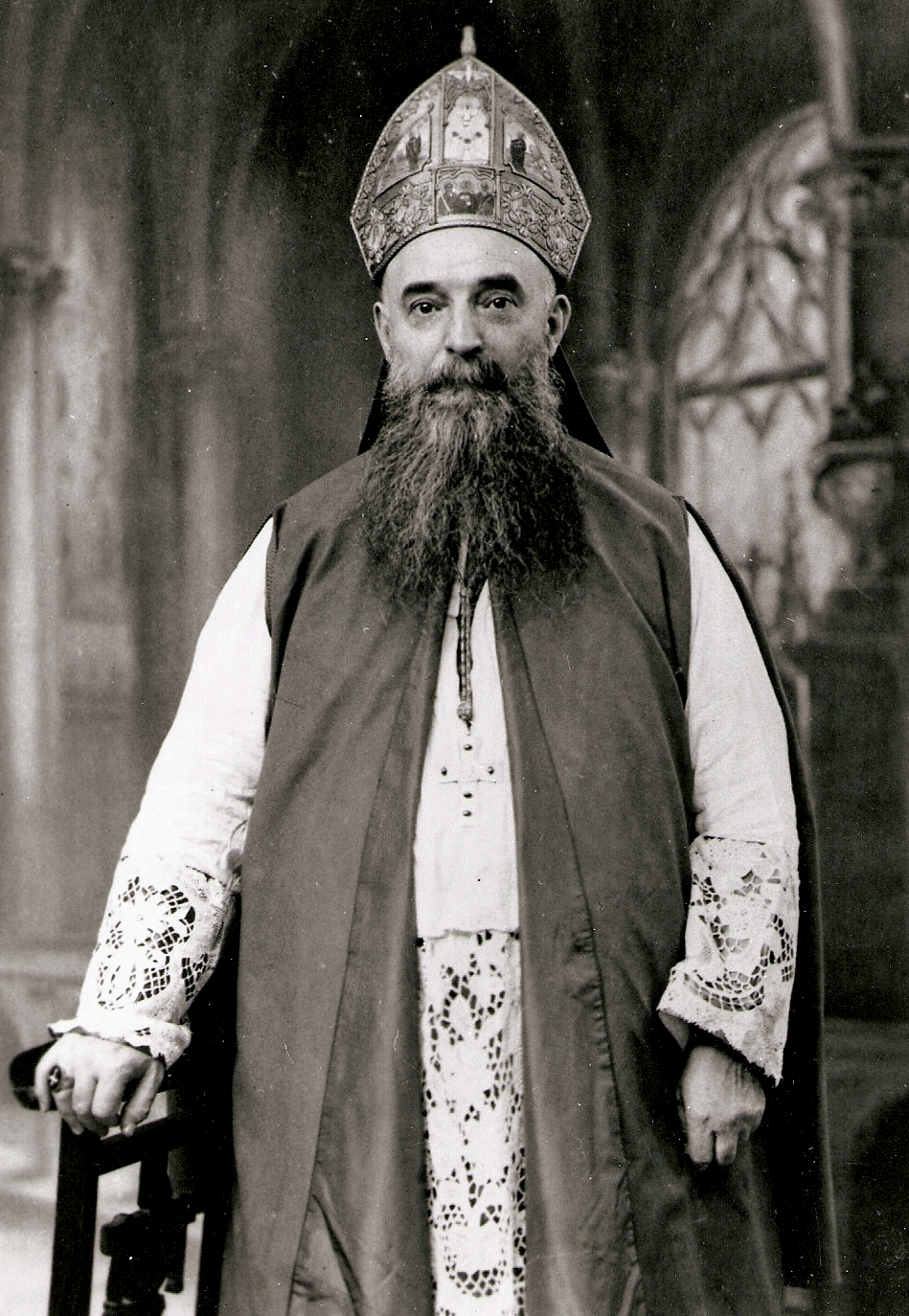
- Church: Catholic
- Installed: March 11, 1926
- Term ended: October 17, 1946
- Other post: Apostolic Administrator of Moscow (1926–1936)

Orders
- Ordination: March 18, 1905
- Consecration: April 21, 1926 by Michel d'Herbigny

Personal details
- Born: Pie Eugène Joseph Neveu; February 23, 1877 Gien, France
- Died: October 17, 1946 (aged 69) Paris, France
- Denomination: Catholicism
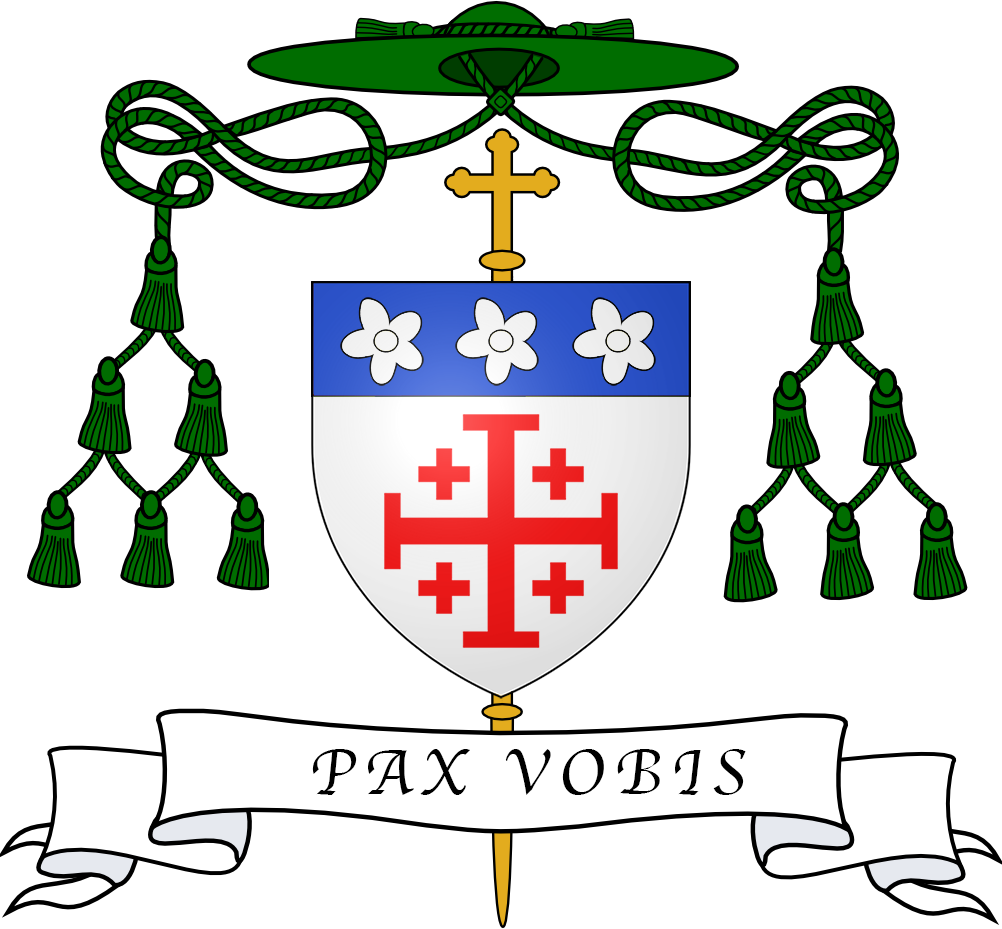
- Coat of arms

Pie Eugène Joseph Neveu AA (February 23, 1877 – October 17, 1946) was a French Roman Catholic bishop. He was a member of the Assumptionists and was ordained a priest in 1905. He arrived in Russia in 1907 and remained there until 1936, serving as the Apostolic Administrator of Moscow from 1926 after being consecrated as a bishop. Neveu was appointed to the titular see of Citrus.

== Early life and work ==
Neveu was born in Gien, France, on February 23, 1877, and entered the Assumptionist order on December 8, 1895. He took his first vows some time in 1896 and took his perpetual vows on December 25, 1897. Neveu was ordained as a priest on March 18, 1905, in a branch of the Assumptionists that was focused on serving Slavic Christians. He spoke Russian and several other languages, and was first sent to work in the Ottoman Empire and Bulgaria.

Neveu arrived in the Russian Empire in 1907 as a missionary and became the founder and pastor of the Church of St. Joseph, serving a group of Belgian and French Catholics working in the mining industry in Makeyevka, in the Donets Basin. He became familiar with the Byzantine rite of Christianity in addition to the Latin rite. He survived through the hardships of the Russian Revolution and sent a letter to Rome in 1922 confirming that he was still alive, and requested resources. Neveu stayed out of local political and ethnic conflicts, and was effective at keeping himself out of trouble with the authorities. During his tenure as the head of that parish, the region was at different times under the control of the Russians, Germans, Ukrainians, White Russians, Makhno's anarchists, and finally the Soviets.

== Apostolic delegate in the USSR ==
In early 1926, when Pope Pius XI was considering secretly establishing a provisional Roman Catholic hierarchy inside the Soviet Union, he spoke to the superior general of the Assumptionists, Gervais Quénard, who had been a missionary in Russia. When the pope asked about Neveu, Quénard described him as pious and peaceable, but also cunning. They agreed that he would be the right candidate to become a bishop. In February the pope sent the French Jesuit bishop Michel d'Herbigny to the Soviet Union with the papal authority to create a hierarchy there, including to consecrate Neveu and several others as bishops. In April, Neveu was given permission by the Soviets to travel from the Donbass to Moscow to become the pastor of the Church of St. Louis des Français, which was owned by the French and served the foreign Catholics in the city.

He met with d'Herbigny in Moscow on April 21, and was surprised to be consecrated as a bishop, as well as being appointed as apostolic delegate in the Soviet Union. In addition, Neveu was named as the head of one of the apostolic administrations that d'Herbigny planned to set up in the country, that of Moscow. Neveu gave him a list of candidates he thought could lead the administrations. In September he received authorization by the Holy See via d'Herbigny to appoint future apostolic administrators in the event of vacancies and to be responsible for the Catholic Church in Russia. Furthermore, the Russian Catholic Apostolic Exarchate of Russia was subordinated to the Latin administration of Moscow due to the arrest of Exarch Leonid Feodorov, and Neveu was also given the power to receive Orthodox clergy and faithful into the Catholic Church secretly.

Neveu was a sharp analyst of the situation inside the Soviet Union and a capable administrator. After d'Herbigny was forced to leave by the Soviets, Neveu sent him reports every two weeks. Although the Church of St. Louis des Français was within sight of the Soviet OGPU headquarters, it was owned by the French government, and Neveu had political protection as a French citizen. The Soviets were aware that d'Herbigny was setting up a secret Catholic hierarchy, and while they could not arrest Neveu due to his political protection, they did begin arresting most of the other Catholic clergy in early 1927, putting the Church into a difficult position. Despite this, Neveu continued to secretly receive Orthodox into the Catholic Church over the next several years, and served the members of his parish in Moscow, who were of different ethnic backgrounds. Although he was Latin rite, he also preached in the vernacular, Russian, despite the opposition to it among some Poles. Together with d'Herbigny, he was able to arrange for thousands of religious artifacts from Russia to be preserved by having them sent to the Pontifical Oriental Institute in Rome.

In 1936 Neveu had go to France for medical treatment and was not allowed to return to the Soviet Union afterward. The Soviet embassy in Paris denied his repeated requests for an entry visa.

He died in Paris on October 17, 1946, and was buried at the Church of St. Joan of Arc in Gien.

== Citations ==
Catholic Church titles
Administration created	Apostolic Administrator of Moscow; 1926–1936	Vacant
Vacant Title last held by José Solé y Mercadé	Titular Bishop of Citrus; 1926–1946	Vacant Title next held by Adolph Marx
