= Michel d'Herbigny =

French Jesuit and bishop (1880–1957)

The Most Reverend, Monsignor Michel d'Herbigny SJ
- Titular Bishop of Ilium
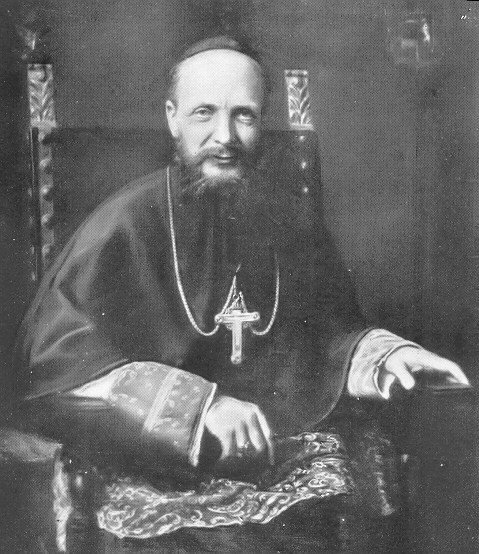
- Church: Catholic
- Installed: February 11, 1926
- Term ended: July 1937
- Other posts: Rector of the Pontifical Oriental Institute (1922–1932); President of the Pontifical Commission for Russia (1930–1933)

Orders
- Ordination: August 29, 1910
- Consecration: March 29, 1926 by Eugenio Pacelli

Personal details
- Born: Michel-Joseph Bourguignon d’Herbigny; May 8, 1880 Lille, France
- Died: December 23, 1957 (aged 77) Aix-en-Provence, France
- Denomination: Catholicism
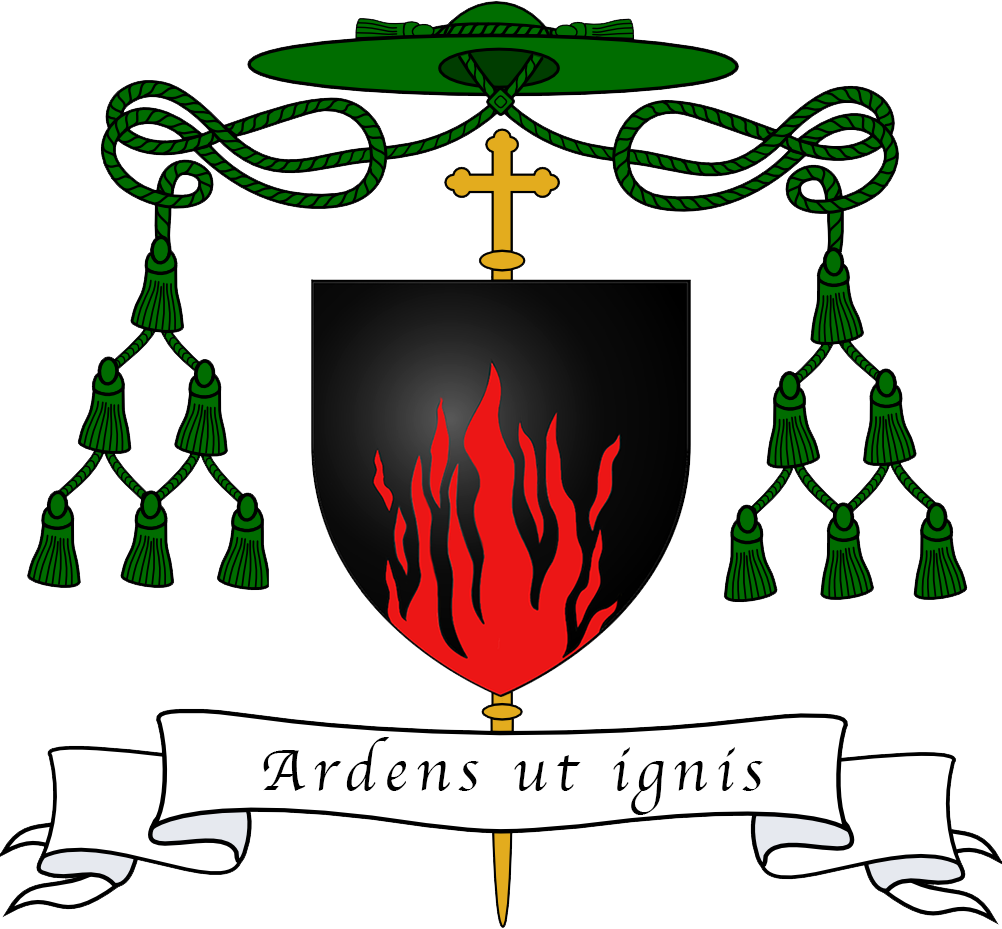
- Coat of arms: Michel d'Herbigny's coat of arms

Ordination history
History
Episcopal consecration
- Consecrated by: Archbishop Eugenio Pacelli
Episcopal succession
Bishops consecrated by Michel d'Herbigny as principal consecrator
- Pie Eugène Neveu: April 21, 1926
- Aleksandr Frison: May 10, 1926
- Boļeslavs Sloskāns: May 10, 1926
- Anton Malecki: August 12, 1926

Michel-Joseph Bourguignon d'Herbigny SJ (French: [dɛʁbiɲi]; May 8, 1880 – December 23, 1957) was a French Jesuit scholar and Catholic bishop. He was president of the Pontifical Oriental Institute in Rome and of the Pontifical Commission for Russia. He was secretly consecrated a bishop and was instrumental in a failed attempt to establish a clandestine hierarchy for the Catholic Church in the Soviet Union during the religious persecutions of the 1920s. D'Herbigny also had an important role in the founding of the Collegium Russicum and saw it as his mission to bring about the unification of the Russian Orthodox with Rome. However, the Catholic clergy in the Soviet Union were arrested, and his efforts were also opposed by the Catholic Church in Poland. In 1933 he was removed from his offices and in 1937 he was made to abdicate his titular see in unclear circumstances.

== Early life and work ==
D'Herbigny was born in Lille, in northern France, on May 8, 1880. He entered the Jesuit order at the age of seventeen, on October 4, 1897, and studied in Paris, and in Trier in Germany. He was ordained as a priest on August 29, 1910, and took his final vows on February 2, 1915. During his studies he became interested in Russian culture and history. In 1911 his thesis on the Russian religious philosopher Vladimir Solovyov was published as Vladimir Soloviev: A Russian Newman, and was awarded a prize by the Académie Française. Because of this, he was noticed and investigated by the Sodalitium Pianum. Having become known as the leading Jesuit Russian scholar, d'Herbigny was assigned to a teaching post in Rome in 1921. In addition to French, he also spoke German, Italian, and Russian. He was appointed as president of the Pontifical Oriental Institute in 1922 and consultant to the Pontifical Commission for Russia in 1925, the latter being a newly created agency within the Congregation for the Oriental Churches.

In 1925 d'Herbigny participated in the plan of Pope Pius XI to set up Jesuit Byzantine rite parishes in eastern Poland for the purpose of converting the Orthodox to Catholicism. The services were similar to those in Orthodox churches, but they were Catholic and answered to Latin rite Polish bishops. The first parish was opened in a town near the Polish-Soviet border, and this project was intended to serve as a model that could be used within the Soviet Union. Both d'Herbigny and Pius XI, who was impressed with d'Herbigny's knowledge of Russia and missionary enthusiasm, believed that Eastern Catholicism could be ideal for bringing the Orthodox into union with Rome. However, the plan did not go very far due to the opposition of Polish bishops.

== Secret mission to the USSR ==
By 1926 the level of religious persecution in the Soviet Union was such that the entire leadership of the Catholic Church in that country had effectively been eliminated by exile or imprisonment. Pope Pius XI took the decision to attempt the establishment of a provisional hierarchy without the knowledge, still less the approval, of the Soviet government. The Pope's plans were set down in the rescript Plenitudine Potestatis and the decree Quo aptius, and involved the establishment of ten apostolic administrations in metropolitan centres, covering the entire country.

D'Herbigny was selected as the man to lead this attempt, receiving his orders in an audience with Pius XI on February 11, 1926. Pius was inspired by his personal charisma and his conviction. He was empowered by the pope as a "delegate for aims known to us" in a sealed motu proprio. On March 29, en route to Moscow under the pretext of an Easter pastoral visit to western European Catholics resident in the Soviet capital, he received episcopal ordination in secret and behind closed doors from Eugenio Pacelli (the future Pope Pius XII), the papal nuncio in Berlin. D'Herbigny was appointed titular bishop of Ilium. Ilium is Latin for Troy; it was a long-extinct bishopric named after that city. D'Herbigny's mission to the USSR has been likened to the story of the Trojan Horse. The Soviet government, interested in improving relations with the Holy See and with France, granted him freedom of travel.

In Moscow, d'Herbigny conferred the episcopal dignity on Pie Eugène Neveu, A.A., until then working in Ukraine, and installed him as pastor of the church of St. Louis des Français in Moscow, with the clandestine role of apostolic delegate for the Catholic Church in the Soviet Union, giving him authority over the country's Catholic hierarchy. Later in the same tour, d'Herbigny also consecrated Aleksander Frison and Boļeslavs Sloskāns and appointed them to similar roles, in Odessa and Mogilev respectively. He also consecrated Antoni Malecki and appointed him to a similar role in Leningrad. In total, d'Herbigny visited Russia three times: once in October 1925 and two separate times during 1926, in April-May and August-September. However, on September 4 of that year, the Soviet government, which had been aware of his mission, cancelled his visa and made him leave the country. D'Herbigny continued to receive regular reports on the situation inside the Soviet Union from Neveu. Most of the Catholic clergy were arrested by the Soviets, but Neveu was an exception because he was a French citizen. He and d'Herbigny were able to arrange for many religious objects to be saved from destruction, with thousands of such objects being sent to the Pontifical Oriental Institute in Rome through the Italian embassy in Moscow.

When Sergius, the patriarchal administrator of the Russian Orthodox Church, pledged loyalty to the Soviet government in 1927, it caused opposition among Russian emigres in Europe. Pius XI sent d'Herbigny on a tour of the major centers of Orthodoxy outside of the Soviet Union. D'Herbigny's goal was to build trust with Orthodox clergy, but obtaining their reunification with Rome was the purpose of putting together a united front against Bolshevism. Several years later, he also entertained the thought of having Bartholomew Remov, a Russian Orthodox bishop who was received into the Catholic Church by Neveu and wanted to form a common front against communism, get the other bishops to elect a new patriarch who could leave the Soviet Union and declare a union with Rome.

In 1928 he was responsible for the founding of the Pontifical Russian College, the Collegium Russicum, in Rome, to educate clergy that would help bring about the reunification of Russian Orthodoxy with Catholicism. D'Herbigny arranged the funding for this institution from a wealthy relative of the sainted nun Thérèse of Lisieux, after whom the college is also named. An extension of the Pontifical Oriental Institute, it was built for a Russian Greek Catholic Church. The students there only spoke Russian and wore the same clothing as Orthodox priests. D'Herbigny even grew out a beard, following the example of Orthodox clergy, on the advice of the pope.

D'Herbigny was made president of the Pontifical Commission for Russia on April 6, 1930, when it was separated from the Congregation for the Oriental Churches by the pope. Previously he had been its effective head as an assistant to the cardinal who led the congregation. The commission had authority over Russian Catholics of both the Latin and Byzantine rites. In that role he prepared candidates to carry out missionary work within the Soviet Union, which included education to become fluent in the Russian language and knowledgeable of Russian culture and history. They also received training from the Polish military to be parachuted into Soviet territory. The Soviets denounced the Russian College and the Pontifical Oriental Institute, claiming they were preparing to rebuild the White Army.

At the end of 1932, d'Herbigny was seriously compromised by the scandal created by Alexander Deubner, Russian priest and nephew of Clara Zetkin, the famous Communist and one of Moscow's international agents. D'Herbigny had hired him as a translator, and the priest was officially the co-author of the last book that he had just published. Having left precipitously in November 1932 for Berlin, for reasons that were not very honourable, Deubner was denounced as a Soviet spy.

== Downfall and isolation ==
Within little more than a decade, all those appointed in secret by Bishop d'Herbigny had been imprisoned, exiled or executed, and the Vatican's policy of attempting to organise an underground Church hierarchy in Russia by means of clandestine consecrations was temporarily abandoned. D'Herbigny was stripped of his powers and silenced, in circumstances which historians have not been able to explain or clarify. French papal biographer Yves Chiron gives a number of possible reasons: an internal settlement of affairs within the Jesuit order; jealousy of his influence over Pius XI on the part of his Polish Jesuit superior general, Wlodimir Ledóchowski; an affair with a woman; Russian provocation in revenge for his antics; general failure of his policies and tactics. Despite this, on May 25, 1933, he was given the title of assistant to the papal throne by Pius XI.

In July 1933 d'Herbigny was sent to a monastery. On September 29, 1933, he was told by Pius XI to leave Rome and go to a Belgian clinic, and he departed on October 2. In November he was asked to resign from his office, which he did. After that, his second-in-command, Filippo Giobbe, became the acting head of the Pontifical Commission for Russia. In the years after 1933, d'Herbigny tried to figure out the reason for his dismissal, but was not able to obtain that information. During 1935 and 1936, he went on tours in European countries to speak about the situation of the church in Russia and the dangers of communism. He still kept his titles as assistant to the papal throne and consultant to the Congregation for the Oriental Churches.

In July 1937, d'Herbigny was forced to abdicate his titular see and forbidden from all public activity whatsoever. After that he lived in different places in Belgium and France, before finally living a Jesuit residence in Aix-en-Provence, France, until his death on December 23, 1957, and he was not allowed to speak publicly about his past activities.

== See also ==
- Edmund A. Walsh

== Notes ==
Catholic Church titles
Preceded by Alfredo Ildefonso Schuster	Rector of the Pontifical Oriental Institute; 1922–1932	Succeeded by Emil Hermann
Position created	President of the Pontifical Commission for Russia; 1930–1933	Succeeded by Filippo Giobbe; Acting
Title created	Titular Bishop of Ilium; 1926–1937	Vacant Title next held by James Maguire
