= Vyg =

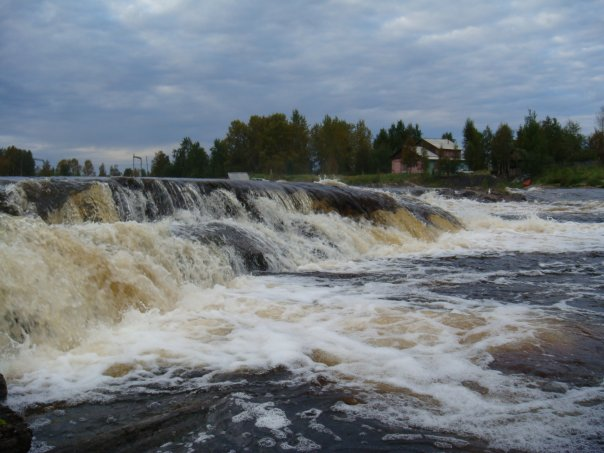
- Native name: Выг (Russian)

Location
- Country: Russia
- Region: Republic of Karelia
- City: Belomorsk

Physical characteristics
- Source
  - coordinates: 62°41′38″N 36°38′56″E
- Mouth: Onega Bay
  - location: Republic of Karelia, Russia
  - coordinates: 64°31′32″N 34°47′22″E
  - elevation: 0 m (0 ft)
- Length: 237 km (147 mi)
- Basin size: 27,100 km^{2} (10,500 sq mi)
- Discharge
  - location: Vorozhgora
  - average: 267 m^{3}/s (9,400 cu ft/s)
- Discharge
  - location: Onega Bay
  - average: ?

The Vyg (Russian: Выг; Karelian: Uikujoki) is a river in the Republic of Karelia, Russia. It consists of the Upper Vyg which is 135 kilometres (84 mi) long and discharges into Lake Vygozero, and the Lower Vyg, which is 102 kilometres (63 mi) long and flows from Vygozero and discharges into Onega Bay of the White Sea near Belomorsk.

The Upper Vyg flows through several small lakes in a swampy land. The Lower Vyg is a part of the White Sea–Baltic Canal and is controlled by several dams.

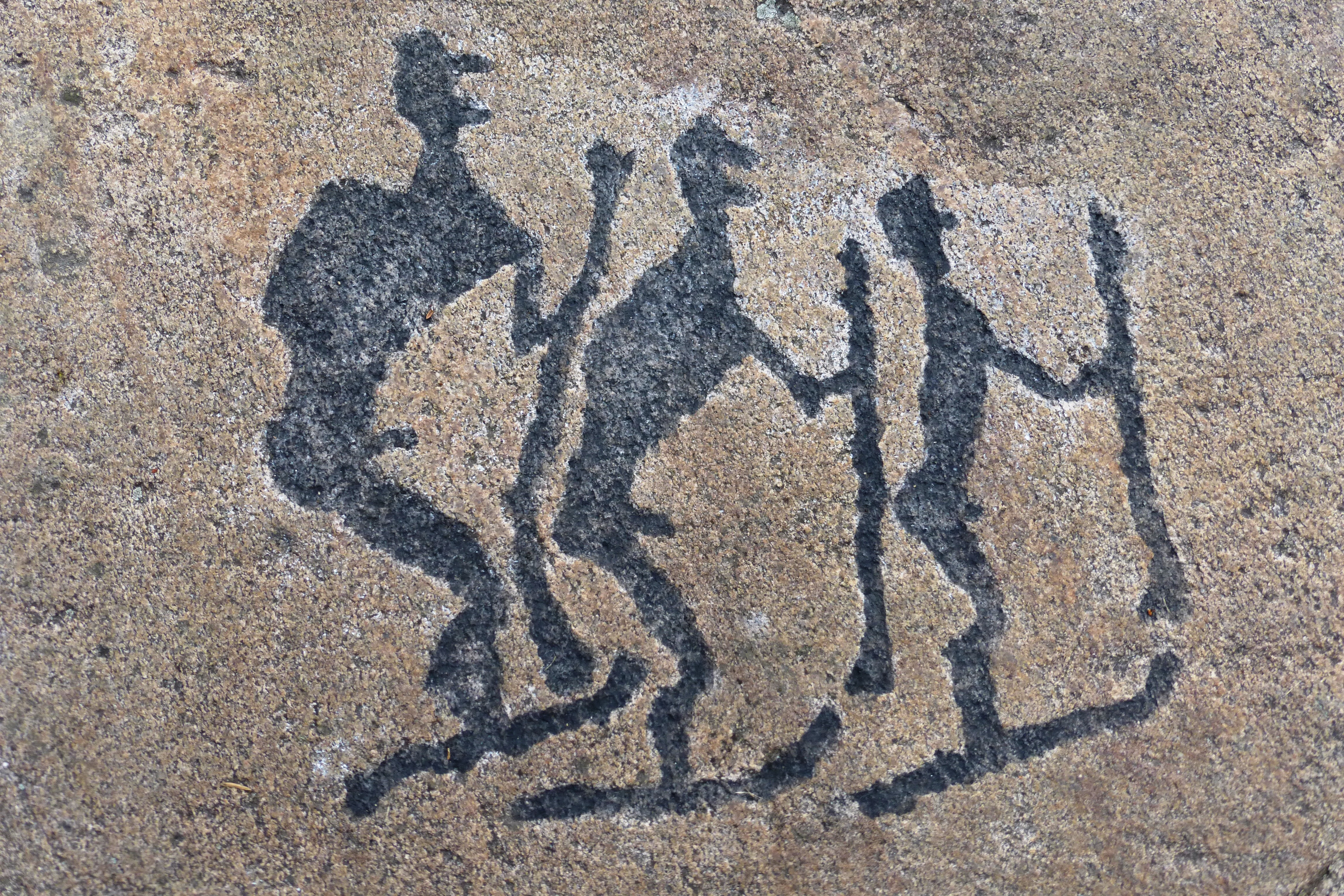
A petroglyph in Zalavruga

Neolithic petroglyphs have been found on islands of Vyg near its mouth.

There were famous raskolnik monasteries along Vyg and its tributary Leksa, notably the Vyg River Hermitage (also Vygoretskaya Hermitage)
