= Boļeslavs Sloskāns =

Catholic bishop

Venerable Boļeslavs Sloskāns
- Apostolic Administrator of Minsk; Apostolic Administrator of Mohilev
- Church: Roman Catholic
- See: Titular See of Cillium
- Appointed: 13 August 1926
- In office: 1926–1981
- Other post: Titular Bishop of Cillium

Orders
- Ordination: 21 January 1917 by Jan Cieplak
- Consecration: 10 May 1926 by Michel d'Herbigny
- Rank: Bishop

Personal details
- Born: August 31, 1893 Stirniene, Vitebsk Governorate, Russian Empire (now Latvia)
- Died: April 17, 1981 (aged 87) Leuven, Belgium
- Buried: Basilica of the Assumption, Aglona
- Motto: Hostia pro Fratribus
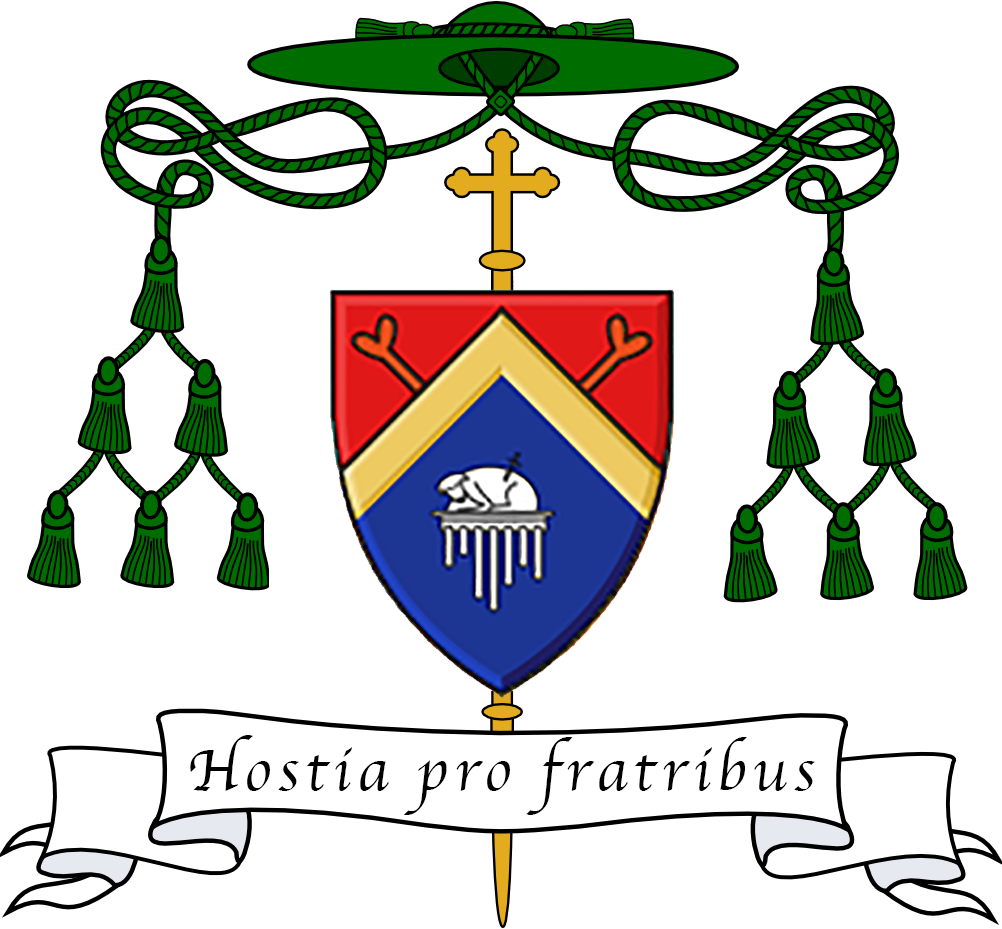
- Coat of arms

Boļeslavs Sloskāns (Belarusian: Баляслаў Слосканс, 1893-1981) was a Latvian Roman Catholic bishop and a survivor and memoirist of the Soviet Gulag.

== Early life ==
He was born 31 August 1893 near Stirniene.

In 1911 Boļeslavs Sloskāns entered the Saint Petersburg Roman Catholic Theological Academy, Russia. He was ordained priest for the Metropolitan Archdiocese of Mohilev by Bishop Jan Cieplak on 21 January 1917 in St. Petersburg. He then served as a parish priest in Russia for several years. He even renounced Latvian citizenship so that he could remain in Russia after Latvian independence. After Bishop Cieplak was appointed archbishop of Vilnius on 14 December 1925, Fr. Sloskāns was appointed bishop on 5 May 1926.

He was ordained titular bishop of Cillium in secret by Bishop Michel d'Herbigny, S.J., on 10 May 1926 in Moscow. Bishop Aleksander Frison was also ordained during the same secret ceremony. On 13 August 1926 Bishop Sloskāns was appointed apostolic administrator of the Archdiocese of Mohilev as well as apostolic administrator of the Diocese of Minsk. On the same day he assisted Bishop d'Herbigny in the ordination of Anton Malecki as titular bishop of Dionysiana and apostolic administrator for Leningrad.

On 17 September 1927 Bishop Sloskāns was arrested in Minsk by the Soviet secret police, or OGPU. He was then sentenced to three years in Solovki prison camp, which has often been called "The First Camp of the GULAG", based on false evidence. He was released in October 1930 after completing his sentence. On 8 November 1930 he was arrested again just one week after arriving back in Mohilev. He served an additional two years in prison until he was repatriated to Latvia on 22 January 1933 in exchange for an accused Soviet spy in the custody of the Latvian government.

== Life in exile ==
After leaving the Soviet Union, Bishop Sloskāns traveled to Rome. The Holy See had publicly acknowledged the episcopal ordinations of Bishops Sloskāns and Malecki only in 1929 when both were in Soviet prisons. Pope Pius XI appointed Bishop Sloskāns an assistant to the Papal Throne on 5 April 1933 in recognition of the harsh treatment he had experienced while imprisoned.

Returning to Latvia, Bishop Sloskāns continued to serve as the apostolic administrator of Mohilev and of Minsk in absentia while he took charge of the Roman Catholic seminary in Riga. In late 1944 he was evacuated to Nazi Germany to escape the advancing Red Army. In 1946 he moved to Belgium where he established a Latvian seminary.

In 1947 Bishop Sloskāns moved to the Benedictine Abbey of Mont César in Leuven at the invitation of the local Belarusian émigré community. This would remain his home in exile for the remainder of his life. In 1952 Pope Pius XII appointed him Apostolic Visitor for all Russian and Belarusian Byzantine Rite Catholic émigrés. His commission was expanded to include expatriate Latvian and Estonian Catholics in 1953.

Coming from a Latvian-Belarusian border region and being a fluent speaker of Belarusian, Boļeslavs Sloskāns actively supported the Belarusian student community in Belgium as well as other Belarusian diaspora communities in the West. He provided financing for two exiled Belarusian Catholic magazines published in Rome (Źnič) and Paris (Božym Šlacham, Belarusian Cyrillic: Божым шляхам) and pledged for the appointment for a Belarusian Catholic bishop.

On 8 April 1961 Pope John XXIII appointed him as a consultant to the Papal Commission for the Oriental Churches in preparation for the Second Vatican Council. On 18 November 1964 along with Latvian bishop Jāzeps Rancāns he co-consecrated Bishop Julijans Vaivods, the apostolic administrator of the Archdiocese of Riga and of the Diocese of Liepāja. Bishop Sloskāns participated in all four sessions of the Second Vatican Council and died in 1981.

== Legacy ==
Bishop Sloskāns' memoirs of his arrest and experiences in the Gulag was posthumously published by Aid to the Church in Need.

After the collapse of the Soviet Union, his remains were repatriated in 1993 from Belgium to Latvia, where they were re-interred at the Basilica of the Assumption in Aglona.

In December 2004, Bishop Sloskāns was declared Venerable by Pope John Paul II, and an investigation was opened for potential Beatification and Canonization.

Bishop Sloskāns is widely commemorated by the Roman and Greek Catholic churches in Belarus as one of the longest-standing Belarusian Catholic leaders of the 20th century, for his support to exiled Belarusian Catholics and for his promotion of the usage of the vernacular Belarusian language in opposition to the historical Polonization policy favored by the hierarchy of the Catholic Church in Belarus.

In 2012, several days long commemorative events dedicated to Boļeslavs Sloskāns were held in Mahiliou with the participation of senior Catholic clergy from Belarus and Latvia.

== Sources ==
- (in Latvian) About Bishop Boļeslavs Sloskāns
- (in English) Catholic Hierarchy
