= Church of St. Louis of the French (Moscow) =

Coordinates: 55.7626°N 37.6313°E

- Russian: Храм Святого Людовика Французского
- French: Église Saint-Louis-des-Français
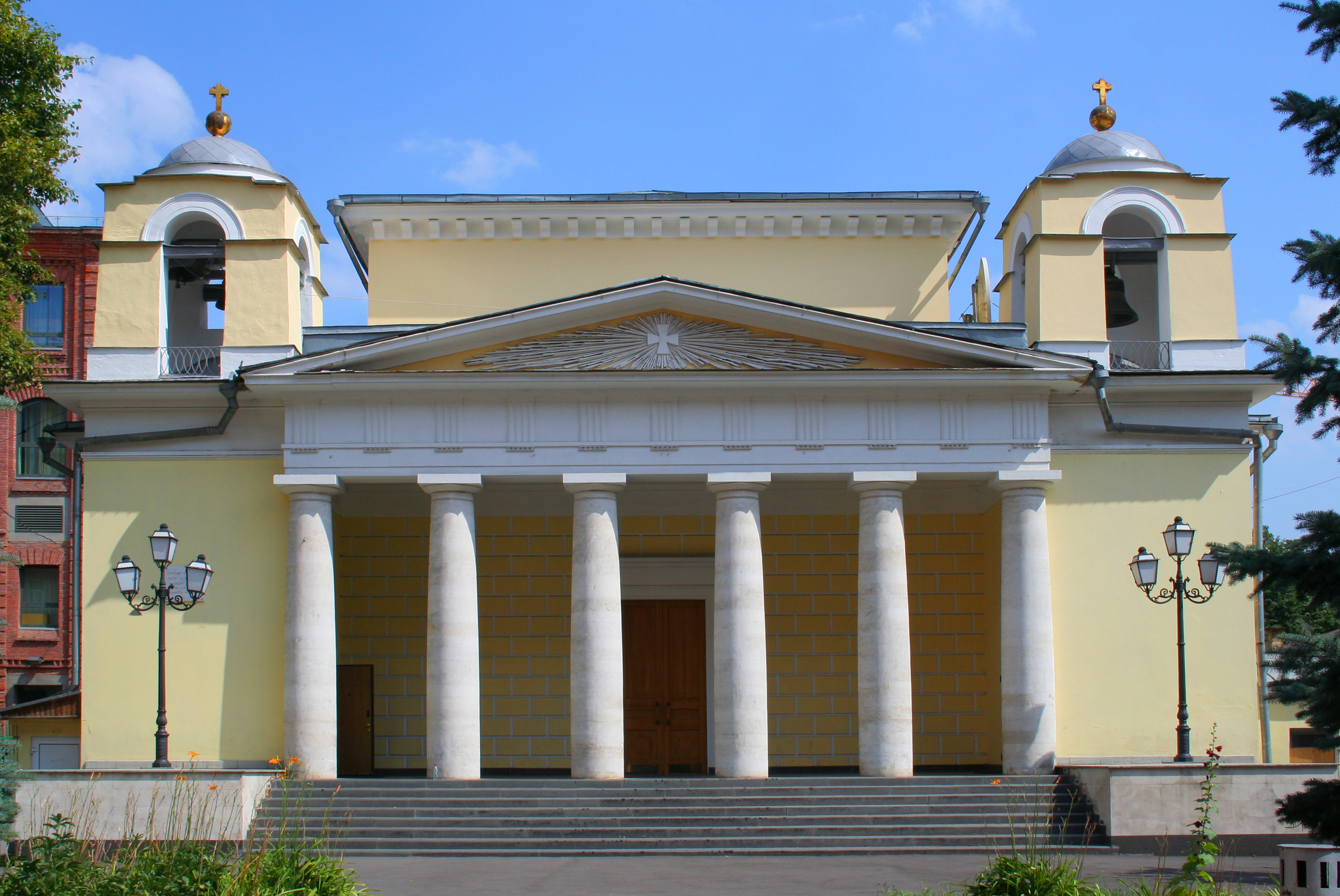
- Church of St. Louis of the French
- Location: Moscow, Malaya Lubyanka 2А
- Country: Russia
- Denomination: Roman Catholic Church

History
- Status: Active
- Founded: 1827

Architecture
- Architect(s): Alessandro Gilardi, Domenico Gilardi
- Style: Empire style
- Years built: 1830
- Groundbreaking: 1827

Administration
- Diocese: Roman Catholic Archdiocese of Moscow

The Church of St. Louis of the French (Russian: Храм Святого Людовика Французского) is a Roman Catholic church in Moscow, built in 1790–91. It is located in the neighborhood of the Lubyanka, in the city center. The church was founded by and belongs to the French parish of the same name. One of the three operating Catholic churches in Moscow, along with the Cathedral of the Cathedral of the Immaculate Conception of the Holy Virgin Mary and the Church of St. Olga.

Masses are celebrated in the church in Russian, French, English, Italian and Vietnamese. The church has a Sunday school and a scout movement (Federation of Scouts of Europe).

== History ==
=== 17th and 18th centuries ===
In 1627, the ambassador of the French King Louis XIII, Louis de Guy, tried to obtain permission from the authorities to build a church for French merchants in the German Quarter. But for a long time Catholics were prohibited from having their own churches and clergy in Moscow. The first wooden Catholic church appeared only in 1688; the French also became its parishioners. Before the French had their own church in Moscow, they were parishioners of the oldest Catholic church in Moscow - the Church of the Holy Apostles Peter and Paul, but by the end of the 18th century this church became too small for the growing Catholic community, sermons in it were usually read in German and Polish, in In connection with this, the French intended to found a separate parish.

On December 31, 1786, the “Treatise between Russia and France on friendship, trade and navigation” was signed, from which it followed that “perfect freedom of faith is allowed to French subjects in Russia.” In this regard, in August 1789, an initiative group, which included prominent French families, the vice-consul and priests, sent out an invitation to all Moscow French people to a general meeting. After the meeting, the Moscow French in the same year submitted a petition for permission to build a separate Catholic church. The request of his compatriots was supported by the French consul in Moscow, Pierre Martin, but the resolution of this issue dragged on for several years. The first priest of the separated parish was the Abbé Pem de Matignicourt from the Chalon-sur-Marne district in France. On March 10, 1790, a chapel was consecrated in the house of Vice-Consul de Bosse.

After receiving the approval of Empress Catherine II and permission from the Moscow authorities, the plot between Malaya Lubyanka Street and Milyutinsky Lane was purchased from Mr. Protasyev, where a small wooden French church was built, the consecration of which, in the name of the French King Louis IX Saint, took place on March 30, 1791. This small church gave rise to the future of the French community, which received great development. The Muscovite French established connections with each other, and French priests enjoyed success among the Russian aristocracy as educators of the children of the Russian nobility. In 1792, Archbishop Stanisław Bohusz Siestrzeńcewicz ordered the following division into two Catholic parishes: all subjects of the French kingdom go to the new one (St. Louis), people from other countries where they speak French can choose one of the two parishes once and for all, the rest are Catholics — remain in the old parish (St. Peter and Paul).

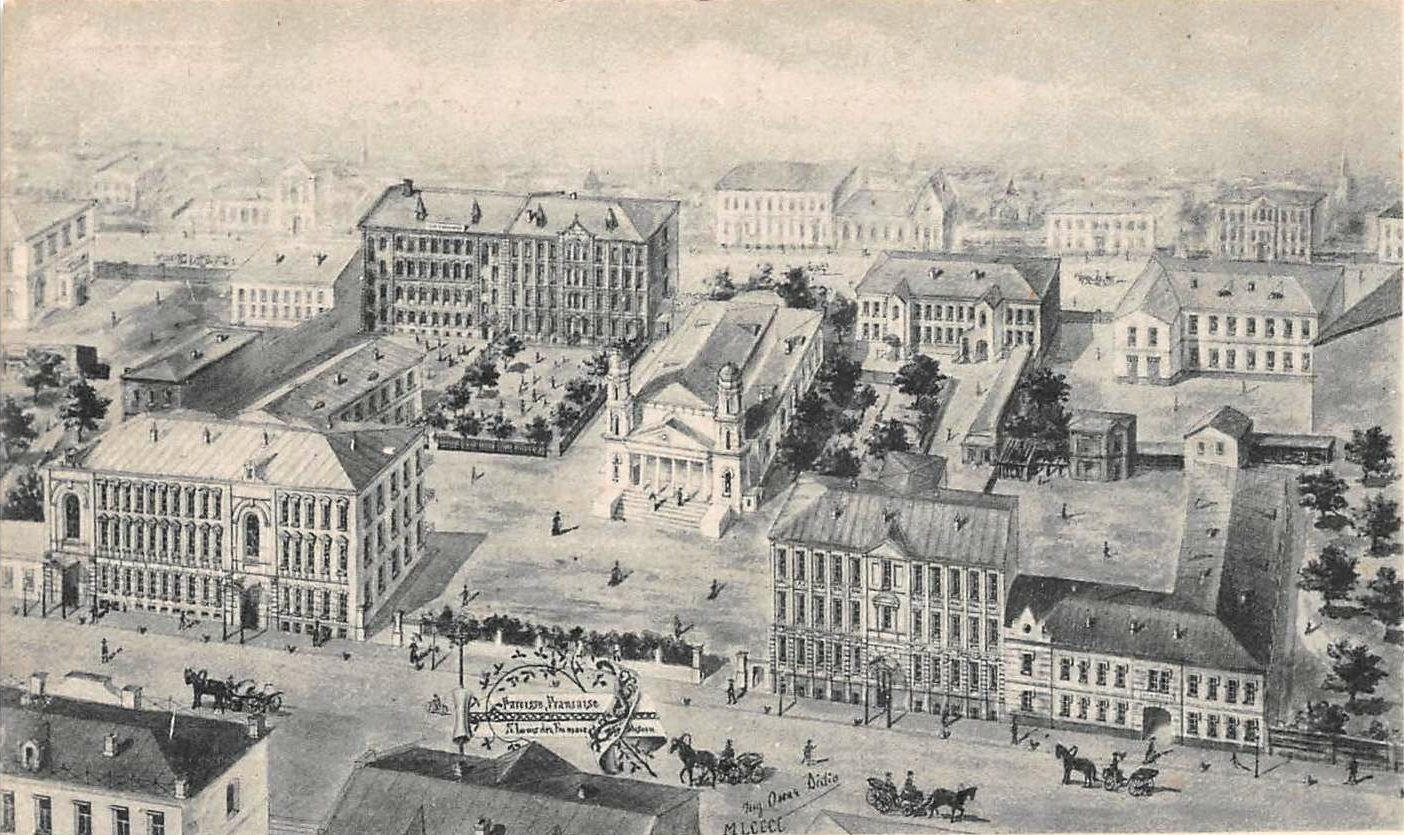
Lithograph of the project by O. F. Didio, 1900

At the beginning of 1793, news of the execution of Louis XVI arrived in Russia, and mourning was declared at court. By the decrees of Empress Catherine II, the validity of the concluded treaty of 1786 was suspended, the status of the French church was changed, which was henceforth forbidden to be called French, the attachment to the parish and the division of the flock along national lines was stopped, the rector of the church of St. Louis was obliged to submit to the rector of the church of Sts. Peter and Paul, and sermons were to be read in both churches also in German. In the same year, the first rector of the church of St. Louis, Pem de Matignicourt, was expelled from Russia.

=== 19th century ===
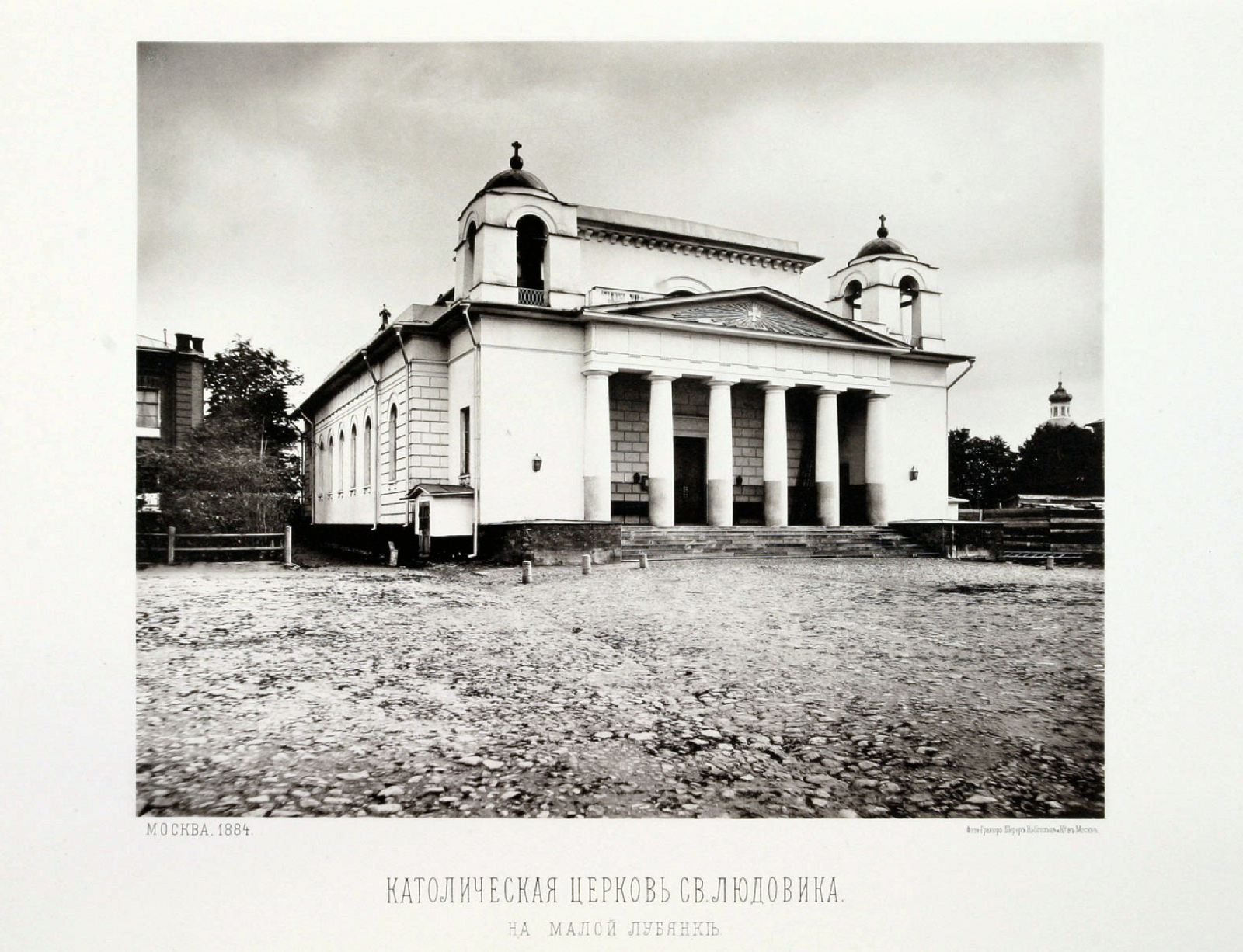
Church of St. Louis of the French, 1884

On February 15, 1812, by order of Archbishop Stanislav Sestrentsevich, the Moscow parishes were again clearly demarcated: the French parish of Saint-Louis was to belong to all those born on the territory of the French Empire and people from it, the language factor was not taken into account, the rest of the Catholics in Moscow were to belong to the Peter and Paul Church, whose abbé was forbidden to interfere in the affairs of the French church.

During the fire of Moscow (1812), the church was not damaged. Thanks to contributions from parishioners and a loan of 50 thousand rubles in banknotes, issued by the Russian government on preferential terms, construction of a stone church began in 1827, designed by the architect Domenico Gilardi, and completed in 1830. However, the consecration took place only on June 17, 1849, as is recalled by a marble plaque with an inscription in Latin in the altar part of the church.

At the Church of St. Louis there were a number of educational institutions. Thanks to the help of patrons, the shelter of St. Dorothea, for which a separate building was built in 1885 on Malaya Lubyanka, to the left of the temple. In 1861, the men's real school of St. Philip Neri, and in 1888, with a donation from Princess Lyubomirskaya in the amount of 30 thousand rubles, the St. Women's School was created. Catherine, which in 1899 received the status of a gymnasium. In 1898, both schools were located in a red brick house designed by architect O.F. Didio on Milyutinsky Lane. The parish also owned the chapel of St. Mary Magdalene in the German Cemetery.

=== 20th century ===
By 1917, the number of parishioners numbered 2,700 people. After the revolution of 1917, difficult times came for the temple. In connection with the "Decree on Separation of Church and State" of the Council of People's Commissars of the RSFSR of January 23, 1918, church property was nationalized, searches were carried out repeatedly and the temple was destroyed, and educational institutions at the church ceased to exist by 1919. A massive exodus of French people from Moscow began; in 1921, the rector of the church, Jean-Marie Vidal, was forced to leave the country. Until 1926, the French parish was looked after by Pyotr Zelinsky, rector of the Church of the Holy Apostles Peter and Paul in Milyutinsky Lane. In 1926, Bishop Michel d'Herbigny, secretly from the Soviet authorities, ordained a bishop in the Church of St. Louis the Assumptionist P. E. Neveu and two more priests - Alexander Frison and Boļeslavs Sloskāns. D'Herbigny was ordered to leave the territory of the USSR, which he did in September of the same year. Soon the secret was revealed and attempts were made to expel Bishop Neveu, but he was left in the country after protests from the French embassy, but in 1936 he was not allowed into the USSR after a course of treatment in France. Most of the active parishioners were repressed.

After the closure of two Moscow Catholic churches, Saints Peter and Paul (1933) and the Immaculate Conception (1938), the Church of St. Louis remained the only open Catholic church in Moscow. Along with the Church of Our Lady of Lourdes in Leningrad, where the French priest Michel Florent served, it became one of two operating Catholic churches in the RSFSR. The American Assumptionist priest and US Embassy chaplain Leopold Brown, who served in the church since 1934, remained the only Catholic priest after Bishop Neveu left. He was in Moscow during all the years of the Great Patriotic War and reported to the Vatican about the state of affairs of the Church in the USSR, and at the end of 1945 he left the country, transferring the parish to the arrival of George Anthony Laberge, an American priest of French origin, his fellow Assumptionist priest.

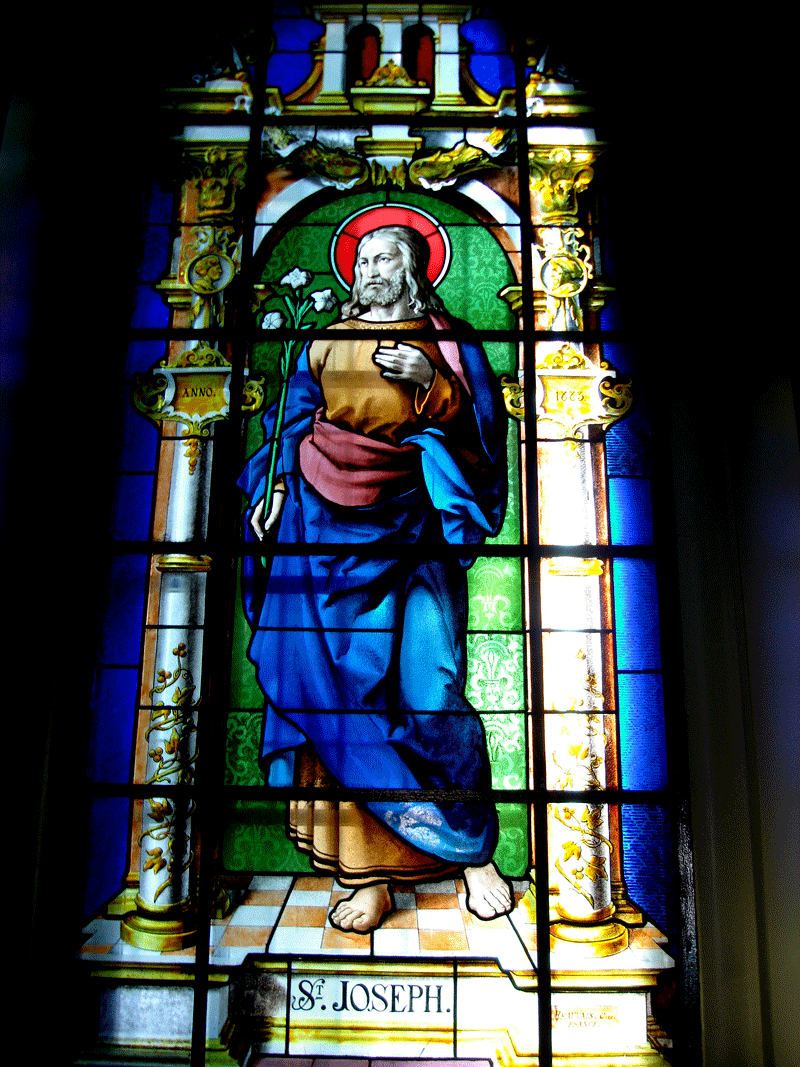
Stained glass with the image of St. Joseph, 1883

Since the beginning of the 1990s, a new period began in the life of the temple. On April 13, 1991, Pope John Paul II announced the creation of an Apostolic Administration for Latin Rite Catholics in European Russia. The ceremonial installation of the apostolic administrator, Archbishop Tadeusz Kondrusiewicz, took place in the Church of St. Louis on May 28 of the same year. In the 1990s, a large-scale reconstruction of the interior of the temple was carried out.

=== 21st century ===
In June–October 2017, work was carried out in the temple to replace the roof and restore the facades. In May–October 2018, large-scale work was carried out to restore the interior of churches.

Currently, due to the fact that the third historical Catholic church in Moscow - the Church of the Holy Apostles Peter and Paul in Milyutinsky Lane was never returned to the Church, in the Church of St. Louis hold services as the parish of St. Louis (mainly French- and English-speaking), and the parish of the Holy Apostles Peter and Paul (mainly Russian-speaking).

The Church of St. Louis of the French is a symbol of Catholicism in Russia, and freedom and religious tolerance. It was visited by General de Gaulle in 1944 and on 3 December 1964, and also by Konrad Adenauer, Lech Wałęsa and Jacques Chirac, and other political and religious figures.

== Architecture ==
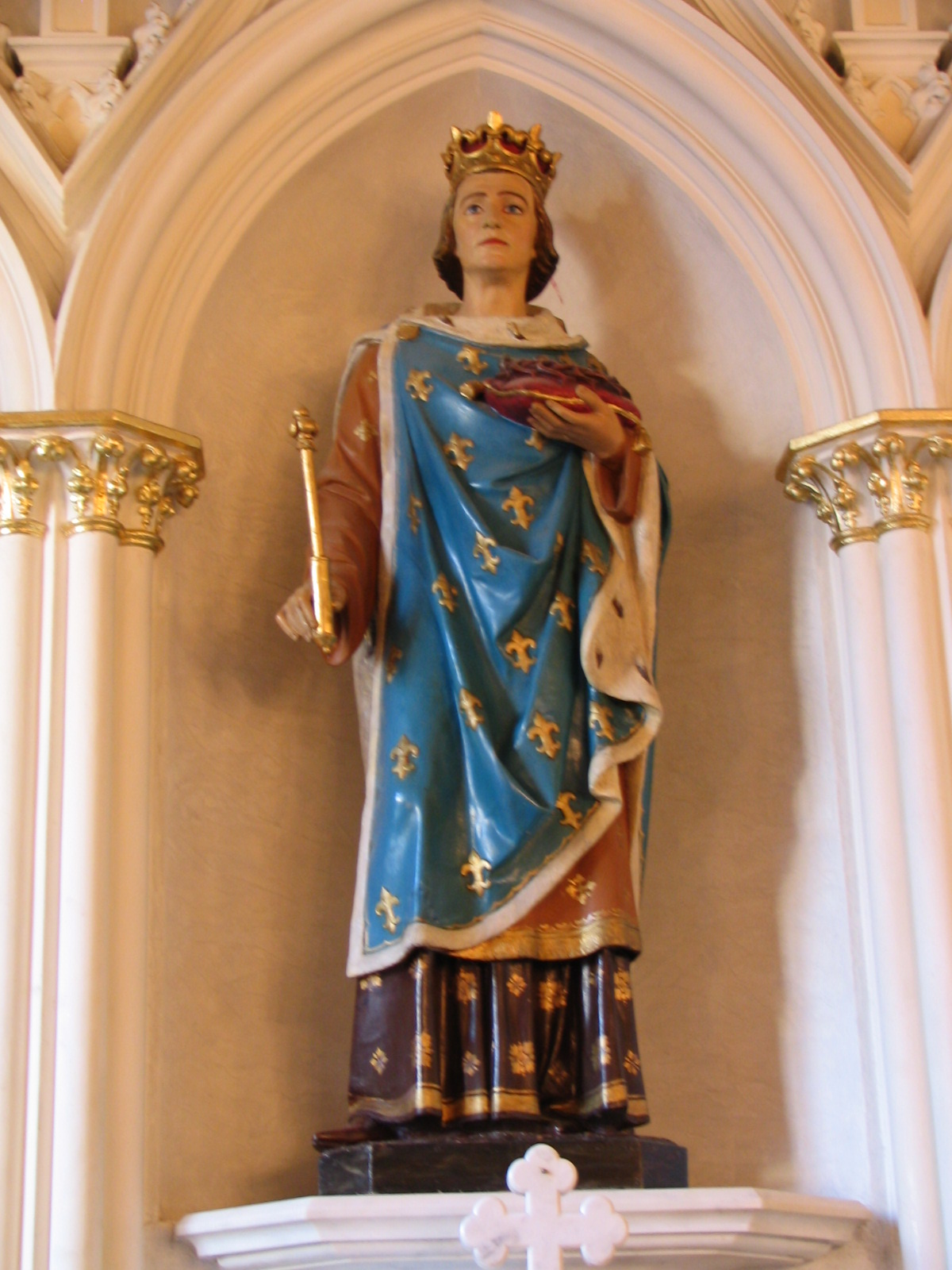
Statue of St. Louis

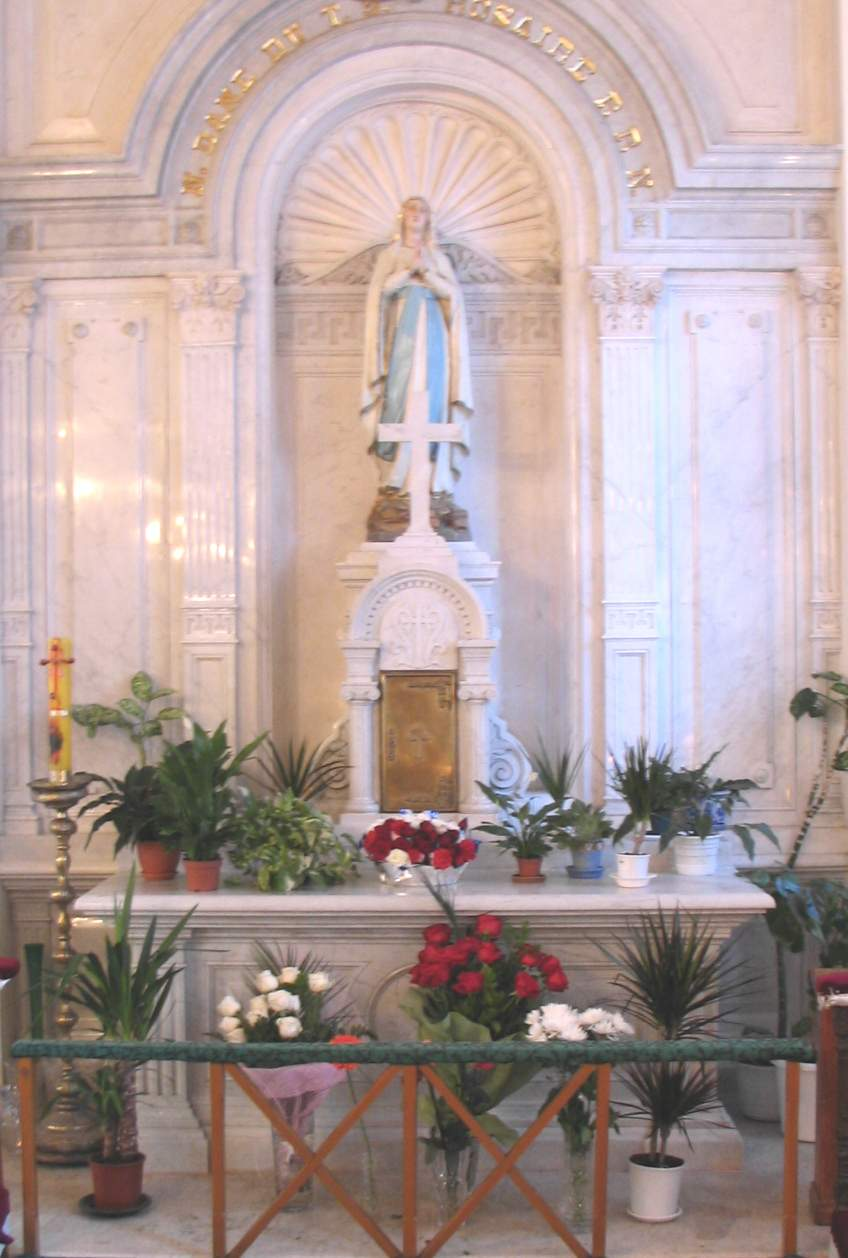
Altar of the Virgin Mary in the right nave

The Church of St. Louis was built in the late Empire style and is a three-nave basilica with a semi-circular apse, a high central nave with a semi-circular vault and lower side naves. The main facade is decorated with a six-column portico, topped with a triangular pediment, on both sides of which there are low bell towers.

Above the main altar there is a picturesque image of the Transfiguration of Jesus. On the altar of the left nave in the center there is a statue of St. Louis, to his left is a statue of St. Bernard of Clairvaux, on the right - St. Francis de Sales. A little to the right, on a separate pedestal, is a statue of St. Anthony of Padua. Also, in the altar of the left nave, there are small statues of the patron saints of France: St. Joan of Arc and St. Therese of Lisieux.

In the right altar there was a statue of the Blessed Virgin Mary, Queen of the Rosary, which was later replaced by a statue of the Blessed Virgin Mary of Lourdes. However, the inscription in French above the statue reads: “Queen of the Holy Rosary, pray for us.” After the Soviet period, only one ancient stained glass window with the image of St. Joseph, located on the right side of the temple.

== Personalities ==
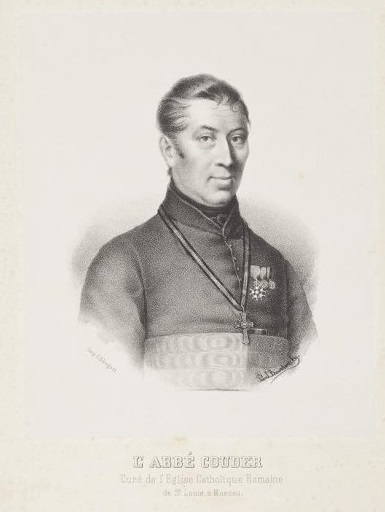
Abbé Coudet, engraving

=== Abbés ===
- 1789 — 1793 Pesme de Matignicourt
- 1793 — 1802 Gohier
- 1802 — 1805 Kien
- 1805 — 1807 Marion
- 1807 — 1812 Adrien Surrugues
- 1812 — 1828 Antoine de Malherbe
- 1828 — 1832 Michel Guerrier
- 1832 — 1835 Nicolas Engerrand
- 1835 — 1837 Shibo
- 1837 — 1839 Voigneau
- 1839 — 1846 Autran
- 1846 — 1865 Coudet
- 1865 — 1883 Amable Bezo
- 1883 — 1884 Mederic de Cosnac
- 1884 — 1900 Leon Vivien
- 1901 — 1911 Albert Libercier
- 1911 — 1913 Eugene Berthelot
- 1913 — 1921 Jean-Marie Vidal
- 1921 — 1926 Pyotr Petrovich Zelinsky
- 1926 — 1936 bishop Pie Eugène Neveu
- 1936 — 1945 Leopold Brown
- 1945 — 1947 George Anthony Laberge
- 1947 — 1949 Jean de Mata Thomas
- 1949 — 1967 Joseph Buturovich, Stanislav Rogovsky, Vitold Bronitsky, Mikhail Tarvidis
- 1967— 1990 Stanislav Mazeika
- 1990 — 1991 Francis Raciunas
- 1991 Anthony Gay
- 1991 — 2008 Bernard Le Leannec
- 2008 — 2013 Adrien Masson
- since 2013 Vyacheslav Gorokhov

=== Famous parishioners ===
- Alexander Goedicke, organist and teacher, People's Artist of the RSFSR;
- Ernest Beaux was baptized by the Vicar of this church, the priest Mederic de Cosnac, on December 5, 1882

== See also ==
- Roman Catholicism in Russia
- St. Louis Church

== Literature ==
- Андреев А. Н., д.и.н. (2017). "Московская римско-католическая община в конце XVII в.: формирование, состав и конфессиональная жизнь". Вестник ЮУрГУ. Социально-гуманитарные науки (17): 6–16. Archived from the original on 7 December 2017.
- Аскиноф, Софи (2012). И. И. Осипова (ed.). Московские французы в 1812 году. От московского пожара до Березины. Мoscow: Братонеж. ISBN 978-5-4579-7976-5.
- И. И. Осипова, ed. (2012). "В тени Лубянки…" О судьбах настоятелей церкви Святого Людовика Французского в Москве: воспоминания Леопольда Брауна и обзор материалов следственных дел. Мoscow: Братонеж. ISBN 978-5-7873-0691-0.
- Крысов, А. Г. (1999). "Страницы истории храма св. Людовика в 1917-1992 гг". Альманах Российских Католиков «Покров» (1). Мoscow: Stella Aeterna: 15–52.
- Пономарёв, В. П. (1999). "Церковь Святого Людовика Французского в Москве в 1789-1917 гг". Альманах Российских Католиков «Покров» (1). Мoscow: Stella Aeterna.
- Ржеуцкий, В. С. (2000). "Французское землячество и Католическая церковь в Москве в конце XVIII в." Cahiers du Monde russe (41/4): 615–628.
- Беглов, А.; Фадеев, И. (2021). "Судьба католического храма св. Людовика в Москве в освещении американского ассумпциониста". Электронный Научно-образовательный Журнал «История». 12 (8 (106)).
