= Diocese of Ilion =

The diocese of Ilion (or Ilium) was an ecclesiastical jurisdiction in Asia Minor during Late Antiquity. Its seat was at Ilion (ancient Troy, modern Hisarlik).

According to the Acts of the Apostles, the Apostle Paul visited the Troad, the region around Ilion, on one of his missionary journeys. A church in the Troad is mentioned in Paul's Second Epistle to the Corinthians (2:12) and in the Second Epistle to Timothy (4:13).

Marinus, described as bishop of Ilion in Hellespontus, attended the First Council of Nicaea in 325. At the same council there was an Orion, bishop of Ilion in Asia, which corresponds to Elaia. In 354, the bishop of Ilion was a certain Pegasius known from a letter (no. 19) of the Emperor Julian. According to the emperor, Pegasius enthusiastically led him on a tour of the pagan temples of Ilion and the shrines of Hector and Achilles, even remarking that it was "natural that they should worship a brave man [Hector] who was their own citizen, just as we worship the martyrs." The city declined after that date, but it may still have been a residential bishopric in the 10th century, when the Emperor Constantine VII mentioned a bishop of Ilion.

Archaeological excavations have identified one church building in Ilion, in the lower city of the Roman phase Troy IX. Its size—30 by 18 metres (98 ft × 59 ft)—and the quality of its mosaic floor suggests that it may have been the main church. It was constructed around 400. No temples seem to have been converted into churches and no church has been found on the acropolis.

== Bibliography ==
- Bryce, Trevor (2006). The Trojans and Their Neighbours. Routledge.
- Kahlos, Maijastina (2007). Debate and Dialogue: Christian and Pagan Cultures, c.360–c.430. Ashgate.
- Mac Sweeney, Naoíse (2018). Troy: Myth, City, Icon. Bloomsbury Academic.
- Mullen, Roderic L. (2004). The Expansion of Christianity: A Gazetteer of its First Three Centuries. Brill.
- Rose, Charles Brian (2014). The Archaeology of Greek and Roman Troy. Cambridge University Press.
