= Gleb Verhovskiy =

Gleb Verhovskiy ( 1888, Saint Petersburg, Russian Federation – 1935 ) was a Russian Orthodox converted to Catholicism of Byzantine Rite.

== Biography ==
Gleb Verhovskiy was born into a noble Orthodoxy family in Saint Petersburg. He studied at the Academy of Arts in his hometown and was a member of the artistic association "World of Art". In 1909 under the influence of Vladimir Solovyov turned to Catholicism and left Russia, to study at the Studite Scientific Institute in Lviv ( 1910 ), then in Enghien ( Belgium) under the direction of Michel d'Herbigny ( 1913 - 1914 ). In 1915 in Bulgaria was ordained a priest by Bulgarian bishop Michael Mirow in the Eastern Rite. Verhovskiy served among Russian Uniates in Saint Petersburg and attended the First Council of the Russian Greek Catholic Church, which took place in Saint Petersburg in 1917 and in which Andrew Sheptytsky appointed Leonid Feodorov Exarch of the Russian Greek Catholic Church. From 1918 to 1921 lived in Lviv and Kiev. In Kiev participated in the Society of Saint Leo the Great.

Married, violating the canonical norms, later his wife and two children lived apart from him in Yugoslavia. In 1922 he traveled to Istanbul, where he preached among Russian Catholics. However, in February 1923 he left Istanbul because of disagreements with the Jesuits caused by different views on methods of promoting the Catholic faith among the Russian people. Then he was appointed rector of the Russian Catholic parish in Prague. In 1924 took part in the fourth Velegradskie Congress, which defended his views on privacy traditions and ways of the Eastern Churches of romanization and the inadmissibility of proselytism among the Russian emigres.

In 1925 Gleb Verkhovsky ministered among Ukrainian immigrants in the United States. He died in Chicago on 11 April 1935.
