= Segezha =

Town in the Republic of Karelia, Russia

Segezha Сегежа Segeža (Karelian)
- Town
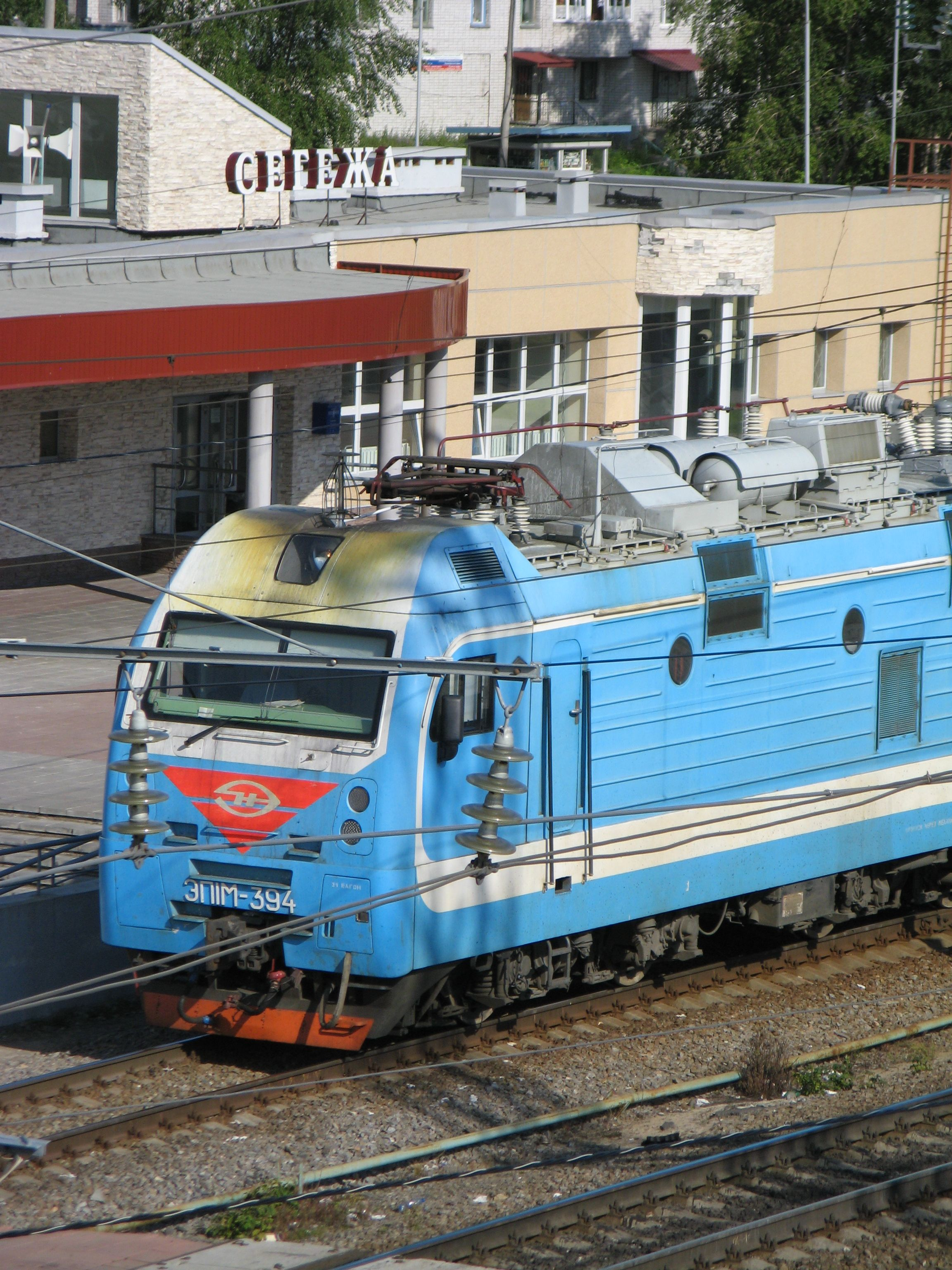
- Segezha railway station

- Flag Coat of arms
- Interactive map of Segezha
- Location of Segezha Segezha (Karelia)
- Coordinates: 63°44′N 34°19′E
- Country: Russia
- Federal subject: Republic of Karelia
- Administrative district: Segezhsky District
- Founded: 1915
- Town status since: 1943
- Elevation: 80 m (260 ft)

Population (2010 Census)
  - Total: 29,631
  - Estimate (2023): 23,074 (−22.1%)

Administrative status
  - Capital of: Segezhsky District

Municipal status
  - Municipal district: Segezhsky Municipal District
  - Urban settlement: Segezhskoye Urban Settlement
  - Capital of: Segezhsky Municipal District, Segezhskoye Urban Settlement
- Time zone: UTC+3 (UTC+03:00)
- Postal code: 186420
- OKTMO ID: 86645101001
- Website: www.segezha.info

Segezha (Russian: Сеге́жа; Karelian: Segeža; Finnish: Segeža) is a town and the administrative center of Segezhsky District of the Republic of Karelia, Russia, located 267 kilometers (166 mi) north of Petrozavodsk on the Segezha River and on the western shore of Lake Vygozero. Population: 29,631 (2010 census); 34,214 (2002 census); 38,207 (1989 Soviet census).

== History ==
The town was founded as a railway station on Murmansk Railway in 1915. A small settlement grew around the station; it was granted town status in 1943. The area around Segezha held many of the early camps within the Soviet gulag system and was known as Segezhlag.

The Penal Colony 7 is located 4 km north of Segezha's center (63°46′27″N 34°17′39″E). In June 2011, Mikhail Khodorkovsky was moved here to serve his sentence. Russian activist Ildar Dadin writes that he was tortured in this prison in September 2016.

== Administrative and municipal status ==
Within the framework of administrative divisions, Segezha serves as the administrative center of Segezhsky District, to which it is directly subordinated. As a municipal division, the town of Segezha is incorporated within Segezhsky Municipal District as Segezhskoye Urban Settlement.

== Economy ==
Segezha is the location of the Segezha Pulp and Paper Mill, one of the largest pulp and paper companies in Russia.
