= Segezha Pulp and Paper Mill =

Segezha Pulp and Paper Mill, is a Russian pulp and paper company and the country's largest producer of kraft paper and paper sacks, controlled by the Segezha Group holding company of the Sistema conglomerate.

== Overview ==
The company produces 270,000 tonnes of sack kraft per year, as well as 100,000 tonnes of kraftliner and 520,000 tonnes of unbleached kraft pulp.

In 2008, Ministry of Industry and Trade of the Russian Federation awarded the company the prize "The Best Exporter of 2008" in the pulp and paper sector. Based in Segezha, Republic of Karelia, the company has 5,300 employees.

In October 2021, Segezha Group bought pulp and paper assets of Bonum Capital, therefore, increasing Bonum`s share at Segezha Group from 4,6 up to 13%. The deal is expected to be closed in the first quarter of 2022 after the approvement by Federal Antimonopoly Service. In December 2021, the group confirmed that the deal has been closed. By the end of 2021, Sistema has also sold 8,7% of "Segezha Group" shares to "Bonum Capital" for 150 million dollars. After that deal, "Sistema" is holding a 62,2% of "Segezha Group" and Bonum Capital`s share in Segezha Group was reduced from 8,7% to 4,79%.

In November 2021, "S-Dok", a part of "Segezha Group", "Sistema Telecom Aсtivy" and "Etalon" estate developer, all three controlled by Sistema, became co-owners of "Basis" company, which will be focused on producing wooden houses.
