= Lake Vygozero =

Lake in Karelia, Russia

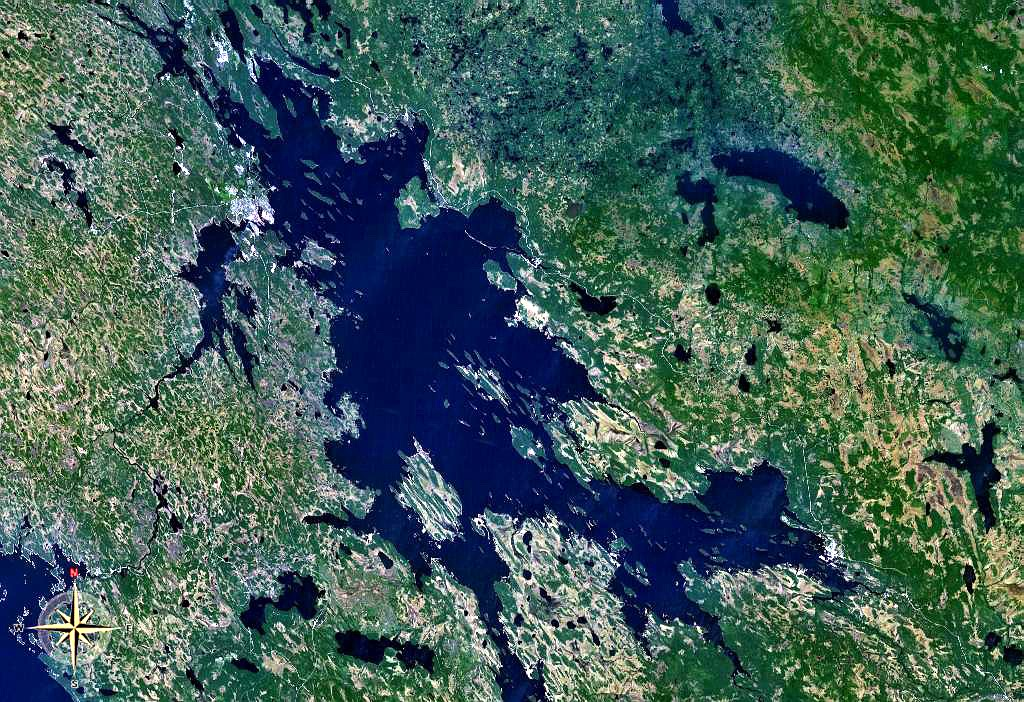
- Vygozero seen from space

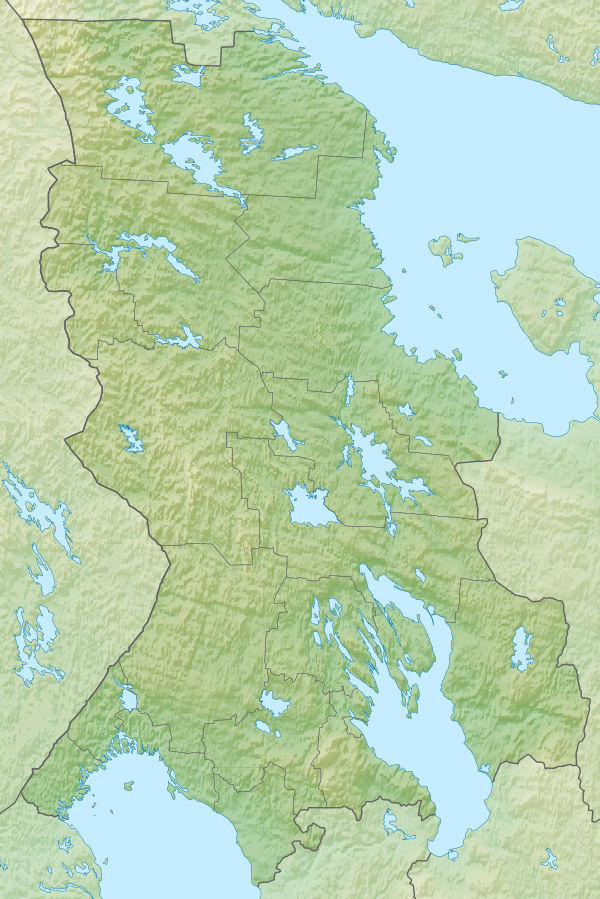
- Location within Karelia
- Location: Republic of Karelia
- Coordinates: 63°37′29″N 34°38′53″E
- Primary inflows: Segezha, Upper Vyg
- Primary outflows: Vyg
- Basin countries: Russia
- Surface area: 1,250 km^{2} (480 sq mi)
- Islands: 500+

Lake Vygozero (Russian: Выгозеро, romanized: Vygozero; Finnish: Uikujärvi) is a large freshwater lake in the Republic of Karelia, in the northwestern part of Russia. It has an area of 1,250 km^{2} (480 sq mi), and is part of the Vyg drainage in the White Sea basin.

From 1933, it has been a part of the White Sea–Baltic Canal. There are more than 500 islands on the lake. Vygozero is used for its fishing. The Upper Vyg and Segezha empty into the lake.
