= Segezhsky District =

Segezhsky District Сегежский район (Russian)
- District
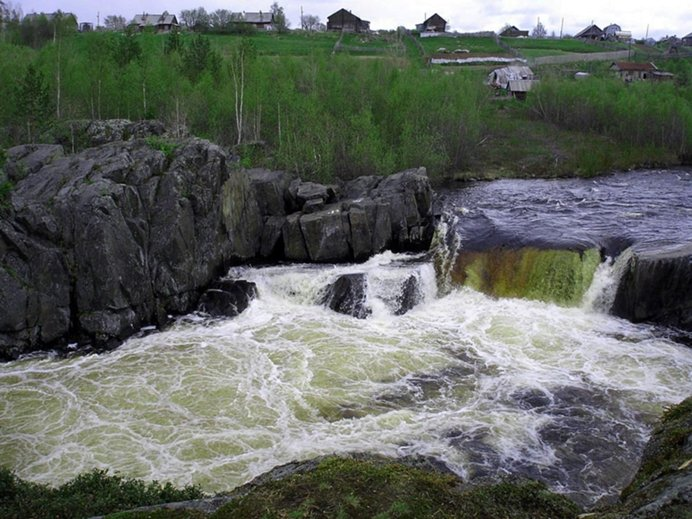
- Voitsky Copper mine, a cultural heritage object of Russia in Nadvoitsy, Segezhsky District

- Flag Coat of arms
- Location of Segezhsky District in the Republic of Karelia
- Coordinates: 63°44′N 34°19′E
- Country: Russia
- Federal subject: Republic of Karelia
- Established: 27 August 1927
- Administrative center: Segezha

Area
  - Total: 10,700 km^{2} (4,100 sq mi)

Population (2010 Census)
  - Total: 41,215
  - Density: 3.85/km^{2} (9.98/sq mi)
  - Urban: 92.2%
  - Rural: 7.8%

Administrative structure
  - Inhabited localities: 1 cities/towns, 1 urban-type settlements, 34 rural localities

Municipal structure
  - Municipally incorporated as: Segezhsky Municipal District
  - Municipal divisions: 2 urban settlements, 4 rural settlements
- Time zone: UTC+3 (UTC+03:00)
- OKTMO ID: 86645000
- Website: http://home.onego.ru/~segadmin

Population of Segezhsky District
- 2010 Census: 41,215
- 2002 Census: 15,624
- 1989 Census: 56,931
- 1979 Census: 56,949

Segezhsky District (Russian: Сеге́жский райо́н; Karelian: Segežan piiri) is an administrative district (raion), one of the fifteen in the Republic of Karelia, Russia. It is located in the east of the republic. The area of the district is 10,700 square kilometers (4,100 sq mi). Its administrative center is the town of Segezha. As of the 2010 Census, the total population of the district was 41,215, with the population of Segezha accounting for 71.9% of that number.

== Administrative and municipal status ==
Within the framework of administrative divisions, Segezhsky District is one of the fifteen in the Republic of Karelia and has administrative jurisdiction over one town (Segezha), one urban-type settlement (Nadvoitsy), and thirty-four rural localities. As a municipal division, the district is incorporated as Segezhsky Municipal District. The town, the urban-type settlement, and six rural localities are incorporated into two urban settlements, while the remaining twenty-eight rural localities are incorporated into four rural settlements within the municipal district. The town of Segezha serves as the administrative center of both the administrative and municipal district.
