= Collegium Russicum =

Catholic college in Rome, Italy

Coordinates: 41°53′49″N 12°30′02″E

Pontifical Russian College Russicum
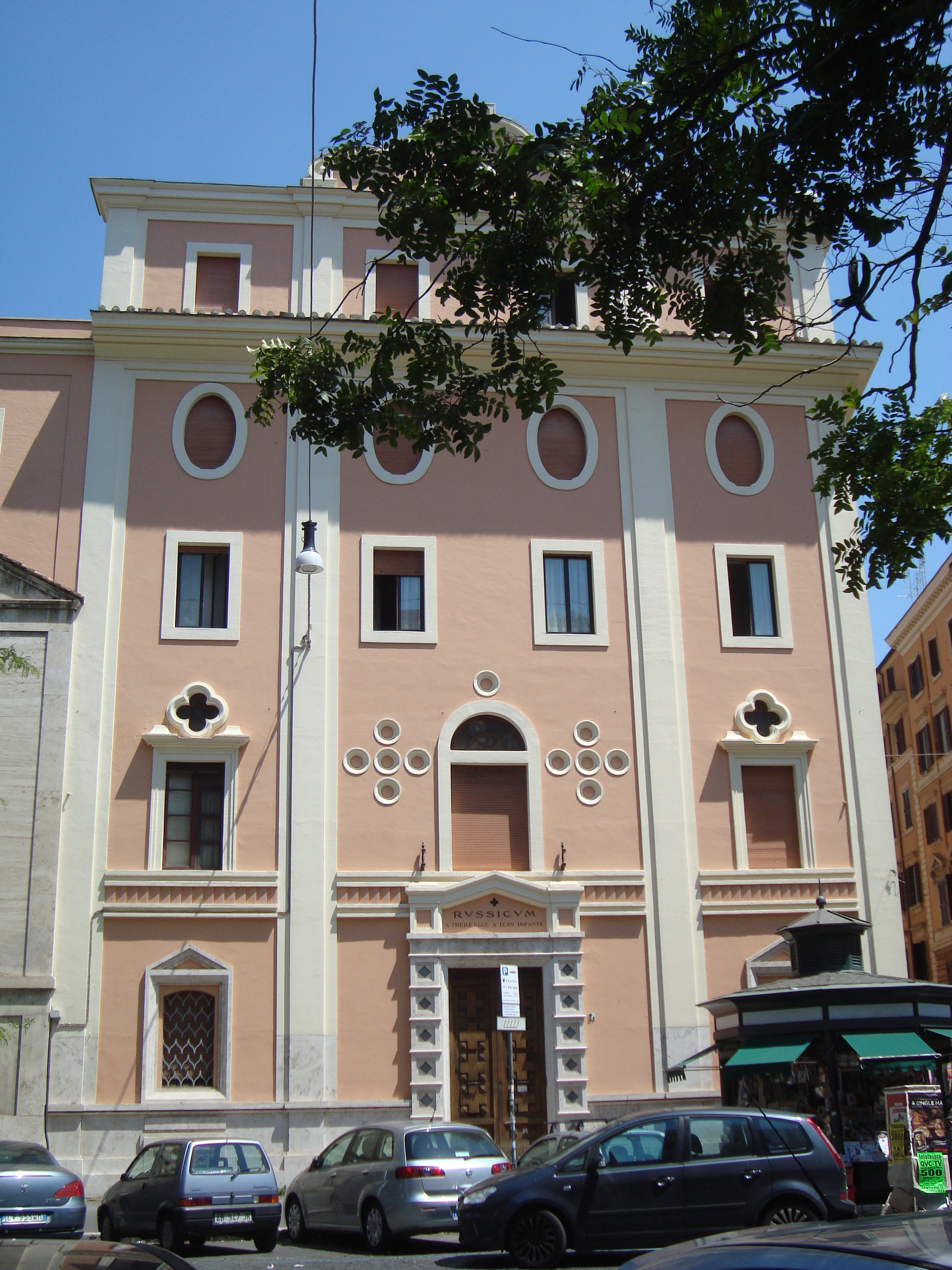
- Latin: Pontificium Collegium Russicum Sanctae Theresiae a Iesu Infante
- Type: Pontifical College
- Established: 1929; 96 years ago
- Parent institution: Congregation for the Oriental Churches
- Chancellor: Leonardo Sandri
- Rector: Tomás García-Huidobro Rivas, S.J.
- Address: Via Carlo Cattaneo 2/A; 00185, Rome

The Collegium Russicum (Latin: Pontificium Collegium Russicum Sanctae Theresiae A Iesu Infante; Russian: Папская коллегия Ру́ссикум; English: Pontifical Russian College of Saint Thérèse of the Child Jesus) is a Catholic college in Rome, originally founded by Pope Pius XI and dedicated to training priests for the newly organized Russian Greek Catholic Church.

It is located near the Basilica di Santa Maria Maggiore, separated from the Pontifical Oriental Institute by the Church of Saint Anthony, and is known informally as the Russicum.

== History ==
The college is built on the site of what was once a hospital, created by bequest in 1529, by Cardinal Pietro Capocci. From the middle of the 18th century the hospital was assigned to Camaldolese nuns, who kept it until it was confiscated by the government in 1871. In 1928 the church of Sant'Antonio Abate all'Esquilino and its surroundings were acquired by the Holy See, which assigned the church to Russian Catholics of the Byzantine Rite and the surrounding buildings to the Collegium Russicum.

The Russicum, which was founded on August 15, 1929 by Pope Pius XI, was intended to train Russian Greek Catholic priests to serve as missionaries in the growing Russian diaspora of anti-communist political refugees, and despite the anti-religious persecution taking place in the Soviet Union, in that very country. The money for both the college building and its reconstruction were taken from an aggregate of charity donations from faithful all over the world on the occasion of the canonization of St. Thérèse de Lisieux, placing the Russicum under her patronage.

The Collegium Russicum is run by the Society of Jesus and provides education and accommodation for Catholic and Orthodox students.

== Rectors ==
1. Vendelín Javorka, S.J. (1929–1936), Slovak
2. Philippe de Régis, S.J. (1936–1942), French
3. Francisco Echarri, S.J. (1942–1946), Spanish-Basque, Vice-Rector
4. Philippe de Régis, S.J. (1946–1948), French
5. Gustav Andrej Wetter, S.J. (1948–1955), Austrian
6. Bohumíl-Feofil Horáček, S.J. (1955–1962), Czech
7. Josef Olšar, S.J. (1962–1967), Czech
8. Paul Mailleux, S.J. (1967–1978), Belgian
9. Gino-Kirill Piovesan, S.J. (1978–1985), Italian
10. Josef Macha, S.J. (1985–1991), German
11. John Long, S.J. (1991–1996), American
12. Richard Čemus, S.J. (1996–2001), Czech
13. Alojzij Cvikl, S.J. (2001–2010), Slovene
14. Lionginas Virbalas, S.J. (2010–2013), Lithuanian
15. Anto Lozuk, S.J. (2013–2017), Croat
16. Peter Dufka, S.J. (2017–2019), Slovak, Vice-Rector
17. Tomás García-Huidobro Rivas, S.J. (2019–), Chilean

== Notable alumni ==
- Walter Ciszek, S.J. (1904–1984) — American priest of the Russian Greek Catholic Church, GULAG survivor, author of With God in Russia.
- Ján Kellner (1912–1941) — Slovak priest, missionary to USSR, executed in Kiev in 1941.
- Pietro Leoni (1909–1995) — Italian priest of the Russian Greek Catholic Church, survivor of the GULAG, author of Spio dei Vaticano.
- Blessed Theodore Romzha (1911–1947) — Ruthenian Greek Catholic Church Bishop of the Byzantine Catholic Eparchy of Mukacheve, martyr under Joseph Stalin.
- Egon Sendler, S.J. (1923–2014) — French priest.

== Notable faculty ==
- Vyacheslav Ivanov (1866–1949), Russian Symbolist poet, convert to the Russian Greek Catholic Church, and Russicum professor of Old Church Slavonic, the traditional liturgical language used by all Byzantine Rite Churches in Eastern Europe.
- Dmitry Kuzmin-Karavayev (1886–1959), ex-husband of Maria Skobtsova and former Old Bolshevik, who was received into the Russian Greek Catholic Church by Fr Vladimir Abrikosov while serving as a senior official of the Comissariat of Nationalies under Joseph Stalin following the Bolshevik Revolution and at the height of the anti-religious campaign. Ultimately deported to the West aboard the Philosophers' ships, ordained to the priesthood, and spent his life as a Russicum professor.
- Alex Shevelev, (1896–1974), Russian Archpriest

== See also ==
- List of Jesuit sites

== Sources ==
- Russicum: Pioneers and Witnesses of the Struggle for Christian Unity in Eastern Europe (review) The Catholic Historical Review - Volume 93, Number 3, July 2007, pp. 694–696
