= Shevelev =

Shevelev, feminine:Sheveleva, Shevelyov, feminine:Shevelyova (Russian: Шевелёв) is a Russian surname associated with the old noble Russian Shevelev families.

- Andrey Shevelyov (born 1970), Russian politician and former military officer
- Alex Shevelev (1896–1974), Archpriest and religious journalist
- Denis Shevelev (born 1981), Russian former professional footballer
- Lev Shevelev (1938–1993), Lithuanian chess master
- Mark Shevelev (1904–1991), Soviet pilot during World War II and one of the founders of Soviet polar aviation
- Mikhail Shevelev (1844–1903), Russian Empire businessman, tea-trader, and founder of the Russian Empire's first shipping company
- Olexandr Shevelev (born 1987), Ukrainian professional handball player
- Svetlana Sheveleva (born 1997), Russian left-handed fencer

== See also ==
- Shepelev
