= Sant'Antonio Abate all'Esquilino =

Russian Greek Catholic church in Rome

- Saint Anthony Abbot on the Esquiline
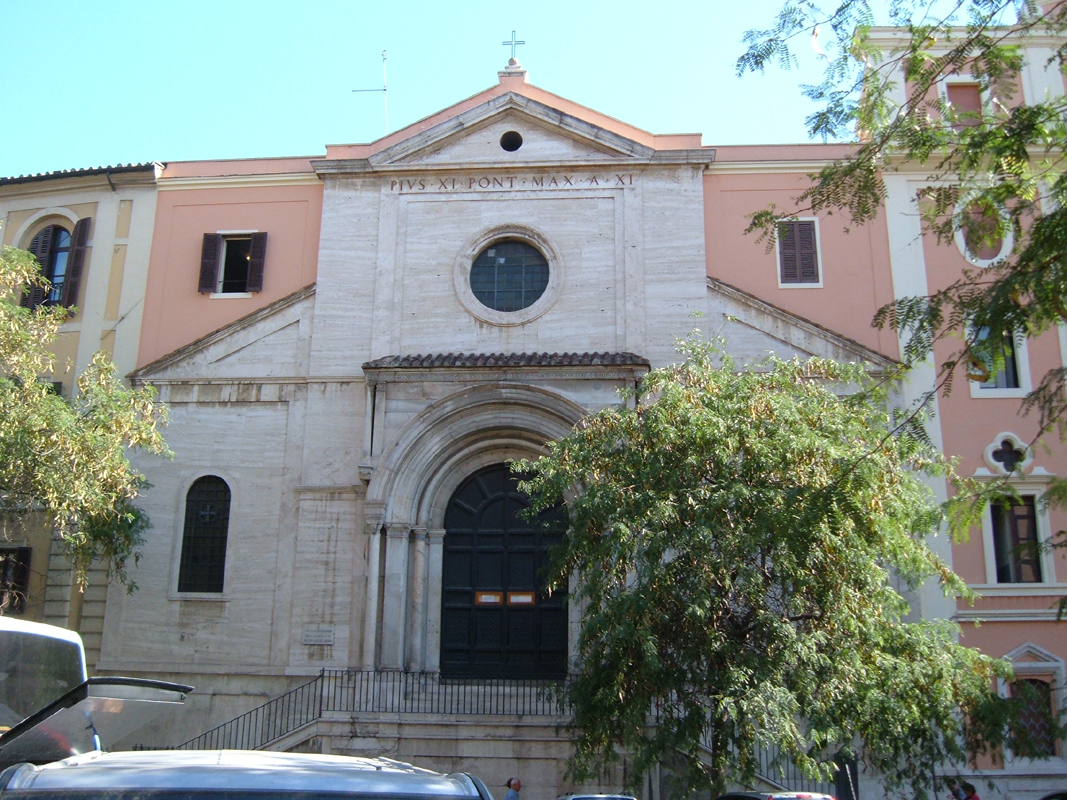
- Facade
- Click on the map for a fullscreen view
- 41.8970°N 12.5004°E
- Location: Via Carlo Alberto, Rome
- Country: Italy
- Denomination: Catholic Church
- Sui iuris church: Russian Greek Catholic Church
- Tradition: Byzantine Rite

History
- Status: National church

Architecture
- Architectural type: Church
- Completed: 1308

Sant'Antonio abate all’Esquilino (Saint Anthony Abbot on the Esquiline) is a church in Rome, located near the Basilica of Santa Maria Maggiore on via Carlo Alberto in the Esquilino district. It is used by the Russian Greek Catholic Church.

== History ==
It was built in 1308 to serve an existing hospital, established in 1259 from a bequest of Cardinal Pietro Capocci for sufferers from saint Anthony's fire. The rector enjoyed the particular privilege that allowed him to attend the papal table and remove the leftovers for the benefit of the patients.

It replaced a 5th-century church known as "Sant'Andrea Catabarbara", which had been built inside the "Basilica of Giunio Basso", a large hall part of the private residence of the consul Basso. Pope Nicholas IV transferred the administration of the hospital to the Hospital Brothers of Saint Anthony, who in 1308 built the larger church. The church and hospital complex was then dedicated to S. Antonio abate. The hospital had large gardens, which reached north to the current Via Principe Amedeo. The church was rebuilt under Pope Sixtus IV in 1481. In 1583 Domenico Fontana built a chapel of Saint Teresa of Ávila (now rededicated to saints Cyril and Methodius). In 1585 Nicolò Circignani painted frescoes on the interior of the dome.

From the middle of the 18th century the hospital was assigned to Camaldolese nuns, who kept it until it was confiscated by the government in 1871. The Camaldolese convent was then used as a military hospital. The church was abandoned shortly after the unification of Italy and the large square in front (where animals had traditionally been blessed on 17 January, St Anthony's feast day) was removed and the level of via Carlo Alberto lowered to create a huge double-stairway, by which the church is now accessed. The annual blessing of the animals, a tradition that dates back to 1437, was transferred to Sant'Eusebio in the early 20th century.

In 1928, the church and its surroundings were acquired by the Holy See, which assigned the church to Russian Greek Catholic Church and the surrounding buildings to the Collegium Russicum, a centre for Russian and oriental studies. The church's facade is by Antonio Muñoz and incorporates a Romanesque gateway, the only survival from the hospital, and an inscription above it recording the hospital's foundation by Cardinal Capocci.

The interior is on a Latin cross plan with three naves covered by a cross-vault. Each nave terminates in an apse - the main one contains a crucifix by Giovanni Odazzi and the two side ones contain Russian iconostases. The side chapels also hold iconostases and the side aisles contain remains of bas-reliefs found during 20th century restoration work - these are from the ancient church on the site and date to between the 9th and 10th centuries.

== Bibliography ==
- Mariano Armellini, Le chiese di Roma dal secolo IV al XIX, Roma 1891, pp. 813-815.
- Claudio Rendina, Le Chiese di Roma, Newton & Compton Editori, Milano 2000, p. 36.
- Claudia Cerchiai, Rione XV Esquilino, in AA.VV, I rioni di Roma, Newton & Compton Editori, Milano 2000, Vol. III, pp. 968-1014.
