= Yuzhinsky Circle =

Russian esotetic society

Iuzhinskii Circle or Yuzhinsky Circle (Russian: Южинский кружок), also known as the Mamleev Circle, was an informal literary and occult group that met around the writer Yuri Mamleev. The group took its name from Yuzhinsky Lane in Moscow, where Mamleev lived in two rooms of a communal apartment in a barrack-like building in the courtyard. The building was demolished in 1968.

The group emerged in the 1960s from the Soviet underground culture and at times had as many as 50 members. The meetings of the Yuzhinsky Circle are considered to have had a significant influence on the ideology and intellectual formation of a number of later Russian writers, philosophers and public intellectuals. The circle never had a clearly defined philosophical programme. Its participants were united primarily by shared literary tastes and an interest in mysticism and esotericism. According to the researcher T. V. Spirin, the members of the circle did not share a single religious worldview; rather, esotericism functioned as a synthesising factor, satisfying spiritual, aesthetic and countercultural needs at the same time.

After Mamleev was forced to leave the Soviet Union in 1974, the circle continued to exist until the early 1990s under the influence of Yevgeny Golovin and Alexander Dugin. From the 1960s onward, the circle was involved in the dissemination and discussion of European philosophical, religious and esoteric doctrines, including currents that had influenced fascism and esoteric Nazism. Its early interests were mainly centred on esoteric mysticism, but over time parts of the circle moved increasingly closer to ideas associated with the European far right. The political scientist Marlene Laruelle has described the Iuzhinskii Circle as a “key actor” of Moscow bohemian underground culture and argues that its esoteric interests later became linked with the formation of post-Soviet Russian radical-right milieus.

== Participants ==
Known or alleged participants of the circle included:

- Yuri Mamleev
- Igor Dudinsky
- Alexander Dugin — in the post-Mamleev period
- Heydar Dzhemal
- Geydar Dzhemal
- Yevgeny Golovin
- Tatiana Goricheva
- Boris Grebenshchikov
- Igor Kholin
- Valentin Provotorov
- Vladimir Stepanov
- Genrikh Sapgir
- Aleksey Glebovich Smirnov — also known as von Rauch
- Oscar Rabin
- Arkady Rovner
- Vladimir Sorokin
- Alexander Prokhanov
- Alexander Laertsky
- Venedikt Yerofeyev

== Ties to Nazi occultism ==
One of the most controversial episodes in the history of the Iuzhinskii Circle was the formation in 1974 of a small group around Yevgeny Golovin known as the “Black Order of the SS”. The name did not refer to an actual organisational continuity with the historical Schutzstaffel, but to a deliberately provocative esoteric and aesthetic appropriation of Nazi and SS imagery within the late-Soviet underground milieu. The circle’s interest in the SS was closely connected with the broader field of esoteric Nazism and the post-war occult interpretation of National Socialism. Such ideas drew on authors and motifs associated with Ariosophy, Julius Evola, René Guénon, Herman Wirth and the myth of a primordial northern or “Hyperborean” tradition. The Yuzhinsky circle gained a reputation for Satanism and other esoteric practises.

== Reception ==
In scholarship, the Iuzhinskii Circle is usually discussed not as a formal organisation but as an intellectual and countercultural network. Laruelle divides its history into several stages: the Mamleev period in the 1960s, the Golovin and Dzhemal period in the 1970s, the Dugin period in the 1980s, and the later revival of its networks in the 1990s and 2000s. She argues that the circle tried to find an answer to Soviet ideological life not in a rival political doctrine but in metaphysics and the search for another level of reality.

Maria Engström likewise places the group within the Moscow esoteric underground of the 1960s to 1980s. She notes that Mamleev’s salon has often been described by participants and later observers as the centre of Moscow’s “metaphysical” underground and of the esoteric revival of the 1960s. Engström gives particular attention to Golovin as a central figure of late-Soviet “occulture” and traces the influence of the circle’s ideas and lifestyle on the late-Soviet musical avant-garde and on post-Soviet right-wing counterculture.

According to Yuri Pushchaev, the circle cultivated what he called “schizoidness”, understood as a form of creative and existential madness in mild and medium forms, a disruption and “transgression” of everyday life, and a declared attraction to the beyond. In his interpretation, this attitude was closely connected with the circle’s exaggerated spirituality and its contempt for ordinary life and “ordinary mortals”.
