= Flavius Theodosius =

Flavius Theodosius may refer to:

- Theodosius the Elder, father of Theodosius I
- Theodosius I, Roman emperor from 379 to 395
- Theodosius II, Roman emperor from 402 to 450
- Flavius Valila Theodosius
