= Peter Dufka =

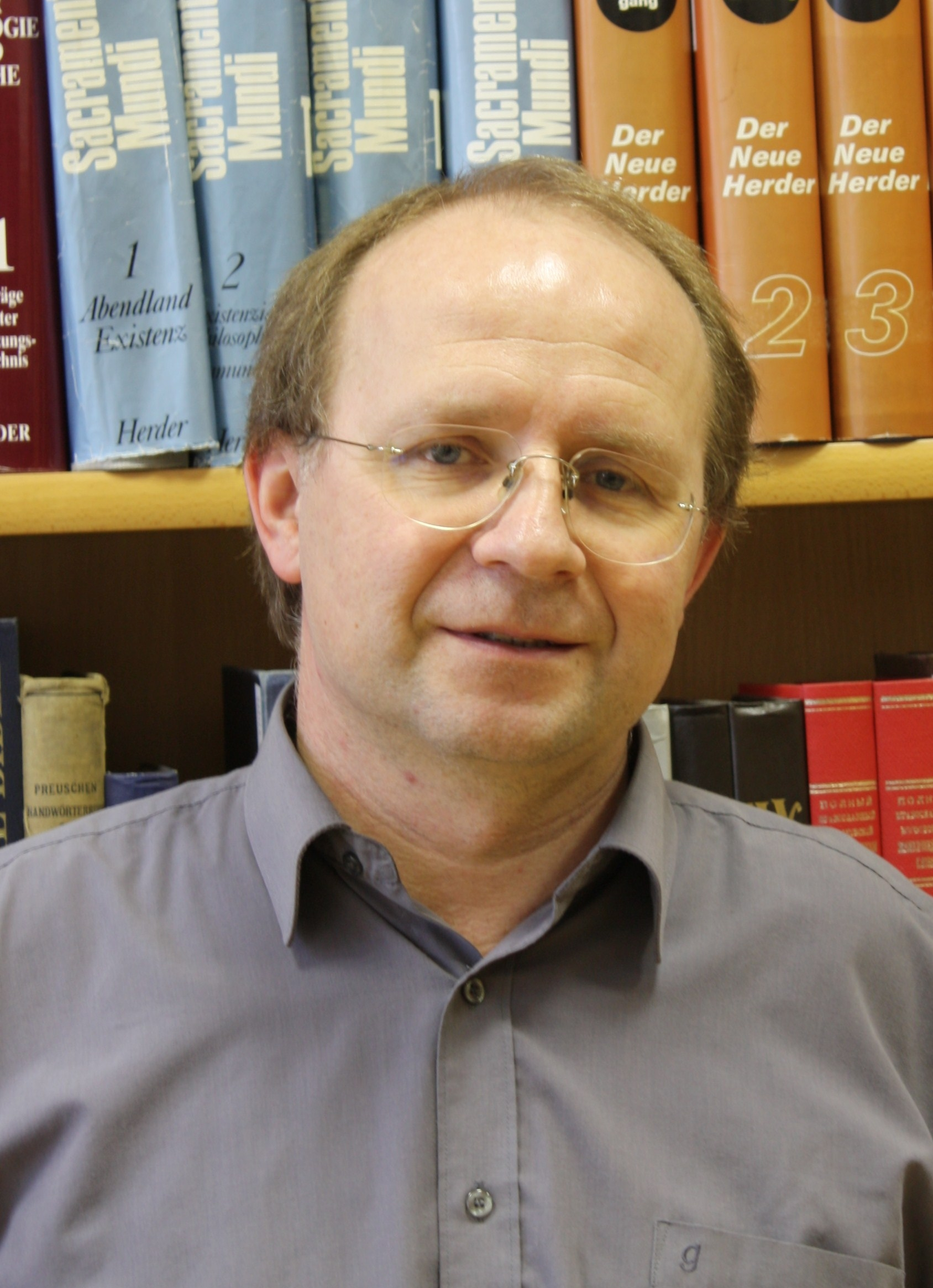
Peter Dufka

ThDr. PaedDr. Mgr. art. Peter Dufka, SJ (born 8 November 1963) is Slovak Roman Catholic priest, Professor at the Pontifical Oriental Institute in Rome, Radio Vatican co-worker and Pro-Rector of Collegium Russicum (since 31 January 2017).

== Biography ==
=== Study ===
Born in Handlová, Czechoslovakia (now Slovakia), Dufka comes from a family of four children, three of whom became priests. He studied at the Secondary Industrial School in Handlová from 1977 to 1981. After finishing school in 1981, he continued studying at another secondary school, the Conservatory in Žilina, playing double bass. Starting in 1985 during his studies at the conservatory, he began preparation in secret for priesthood in the Society of Jesus. Dufka finished his basic theological studies in 1996 at the Theological Institute (at present Faculty of Theology at Trnava University in Bratislava). However, during his theological studies, he continued his studies in music at The Academy of Performing Arts in Bratislava, where he graduated in 1992.

He was ordained a priest on 29 June 1996 in Bratislava by Bishop Peter Dubovský. His older brother, Juraj Dufka, was ordained together with him. In 1999, his younger brother Vlastimil Dufka received Holy Orders. All three Dufka brothers have academic education in the arts.

After his ordination, Dufka worked in pastoral care in Ružomberok at Exaltation of the Holy Cross Church as an assistant priest and the teacher of religion at Secondary Medical School. Since 31 July 1997, he has worked in the Slovak department of Vatican Radio. He returned to Slovakia in 1999, where he spent his pastoral-formative year in the Retreat House in Prešov. He returned to Rome again in 2000 where he began studying theology at the Pontifical Gregorian University. Here, in 2002, he obtained the Licentiate of Fundamental Theology. He stayed in Rome until 2006 and continued his Doctorate in Theology, graduating in 2008. At the same time, he obtained his Doctorate in Education at the Catholic University in Ružomberok.

Starting in September 2006, he ministered at the Sacred Heart Church in Košice and was the director of the Michal Lacko Centre of Spirituality East-West. At the same time, he was an external professor at The Pontifical Oriental Institute in Rome. He went to Rome in November 2009, where he became the head of Vatican Radio's Slovak department. He worked there until October 2011, when he began work at The Pontifical Oriental Institute. He still cooperates with Vatican Radio and is also the helping spiritual at The Pontifical Nepomucenum College in Rome. He has taught at the Pontifical Gregorian University in Rome since 2013.

=== Vatican Radio work ===
He began work at Vatican Radio on 2 August 1997, when he became the editor. He became the head of the Slovak department in November 2009. In October 2011, he became a lecturer at the university; therefore, he left his position and became an external partner. At Vatican Radio, he broadcast the regular program "The spirituality of contemporary man" and contributed to the program "The interview of the week".

=== Education and academic activity ===
He began teaching ethics and religion in 1996 at the Secondary Medical School of Marie-Therese Scherer in Ružomberok and Aesthetics in 2007 at the Faculty of Education at the Catholic University in Košice. Since 2011, he teaches Byzantine music, aesthetics and Christian spirituality at the Pontifical Oriental Institute in Rome Within the spirituality of the Christian East, he has been running the following courses: Fundamentals of spirituality, Prayer in the Christian East, Monasticism and religious life, Distinction and spiritual warfare, Spiritual accompaniment. Within the seminars and other lectures, he focuses on topics such as: beauty as an expression and an incentive of the faith, aesthetic perception of spiritual music, and Byzantine music. In addition, he supervises license and doctoral theses.

== Work ==
Dufka is the author of several publications regarding spirituality and musical arts. He makes use of his musical education in chamber performances.

== Bibliography ==
- Theological perception of music – convergence of five views, Ružomberok, 2007, ISBN 978-80-8084-181-2
- L'arte musicale come espressione e stimolo della fede. La Passione secondo Giovanni di J.S. Bach, Rome, 2008, p. 119 (Italy)
- L'arte musicale come espressione e stimolo della fede. La Passione secondo Giovanni di J.S. Bach, Trnava, 2009, ISBN 978-80-7141-662-3
- Percezione teologica del'arte musicale - una convergenza fra cingue impostazioni, Ružomberok, Verbum, 2012, ISBN 978-80-80-848-637
- Spirituality of contemporary man, Trnava, Dobrá kniha 2014, ISBN 978-80-7141-893-1

=== Professional articles ===
He contributes to Slovak journals for the religious:

- Consecrated life – Monthly magazine dedicated to the education of consecrated persons
- Faith and Life – Theological journal led by the Jesuits in Slovakia
- Catholic Newspaper – Catholic weekly newspaper of 80 000 copies
- Missionary – monthly Slovak Catholics

=== Music ===
- CD: Veni Creator, Chorus Salvatoris, vocal-instrumental sacral compositions [2]

== Literature ==
- Uhrinová, Miriam: Vybrané didaktické aspekty prírodovedného vzdelávania v materskej škole, Ružomberok, 2011.
- Plašienková, Z.; Leško, V.; Szotek B.: Filozofické myslenie v stredoeurópskom priestore - tradície a súčasnosť, Košice, 2011, s. 441.
- Tavel, Peter: Chápanie hodnoty podľa Viktora Emanuela Frankla, Olomouc, 2011
- Karwatowska, Malgorzata; Siwiec, Adam: O wartosciach a wartosciowaniu historia - literatura edukacia, Chelm, 2012.

Catholic Church titles
Preceded by Anto Lozuk, S.J.	Rector of the Pontifical Collegium Russicum; 2017–2019; Vice-Rector	Succeeded by Tomás García-Huidobro Rivas, S.J.
