= Pietro Capocci =

- Cardinal-Deacon of San Giorgio in Velabro
- Church: Catholic Church
- See: San Giorgio in Velabro
- In office: 28 May 1244 – May 1259
- Predecessor: Peter of Capua the Younger
- Successor: Goffredo da Alatri

Orders
- Created cardinal: 28 May 1244 by Pope Innocent IV

Personal details
- Born: c. 1200 Rome, Papal States
- Died: 19/21 May 1259 Rome, Papal States

Pietro Capocci (c.1200, in Rome – 19/21 May 1259, in Rome) was a Roman Catholic cardinal, created by Pope Innocent IV in the consistory of 28 May 1244 cardinal deacon of San Giorgio in Velabro.

== Life ==
Pietro Capocci was born about 1200, in Rome, to Giacomo di Giovanni Capocci and his wife Vinia, a family related to Pope Honorius III, as well as the Colonna, the Orsini and the Cenci. In 1256, his parents donated a tabernacle to Santa Maria Maggiore.

In 1222 he was appointed a canon at St. Peter's; he was also granted a prebend at Guilden Morden in Cambridgeshire. In May 1244, he was created cardinal deacon of S Giorgio in Velabro, and subsequently donated land next to its tower. He was also a patron of Santa Prassede and San Martino ai Monti. Later in 1244, he accompanied Pope Innocent IV to Lyon.

In 1249 he was named legate in four provinces of the Papal States: Marca Anconitana, Sabina, Campagna e Marittima and the duchy of Spoleto and led the papal forces against Frederick II, Holy Roman Emperor, but was defeated at Cingoli. During his tenure as legate Capocci demonstrated both diplomatic ability and great military courage.

In 1256, Capocci owned a house next to the 9th century church of Santa Maria in Via. A purported miraculous event occurred regarding an image of the Virgin Mary at the well in the adjoining stable yard. Pope Innocent IV directed Capocci to build a chapel to commemorate the event. Subsequent renovations incorporated the chapel into the church.

In 1259, Capocci bequeathed a good part of his fortune to build a hospital to house the sick suffering from skin diseases and in particular from the so-called 'St Antony fire'. The hospital, built next to the 5th century church of Sant'Andrea Catabarbara, took its name from the church and the first rector was appointed by Pope Clement IV in 1266. Legend has it that Francis of Assisi was also hospitalised here. The rector enjoyed a special privilege that allowed him to attend the papal table and take away the leftovers for the benefit of the patients. The hospital had extensice gardens. The church was later replaced by the larger Sant'Antonio Abate all'Esquilino, whose facade incorporates a Romanesque gateway, the only survival from the hospital, and an inscription above it recording the hospital's foundation by Cardinal Capocci.

Pietro Capocci was buried in the Capocci chapel of Santa Barbara at Santa Maria Maggiore which he himself had built.
