= Egon Sendler =

French painter

Egon Sendler (1 August 1923 – 17 March 2014) was a Catholic priest of the Jesuit order and one of the world's foremost experts on the painting of Eastern Orthodox icons. He was also an author, teacher, theologian, and artist. He earned considerable respect from many Orthodox experts on icons.

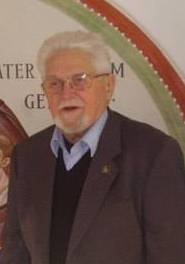
Rev. Fr. Egon Sendler

== Biography ==
Sendler was born in Waldtal/Małkowice, Silesia, in 1923. After the Second World War and three years of war captivity in Russia, he joined the Jesuits in Germany in 1948. He was educated in Munich, Rome in the Russicum and Paris, where he studied Byzantine art history. He was fluent in French, Russian, German, Italian, and Polish. From 1959 he lived and taught at the Jesuit College Saint-Georges of Meudon, France. After retiring, he lived in Versailles.

In 1970, he established the icons section of the Centre d'Études Russes Saint-Georges, located in Meudon, just outside Paris. In 2002, this centre was renamed Atelier Saint-Georges and relocated to Versailles. It provides workshops for both beginner and advanced icon painters. For more than thirty years, he has also taught icon workshops in countries throughout the world, including Italy, Argentina, the United States, and Réunion. To supplement this instruction, he frequently leads his students on tours/pilgrimages to Russia, Greece and Cyprus.

Sendler was a prolific icon painter, painting in both the Russian and Byzantine traditions; his icons and frescoes are displayed in France, Italy, Lebanon and the United States. In recent years, an icon workshop named Atelier Saint-André was established in Lausanne, Switzerland. It is a community of independent painters who follow the teachings of Sendler and work in cooperation with the Atelier Saint-Georges. Their murals, frescoes, and icons "strictly adhere to the canonical and aesthetic rules of traditional iconography which have developed through the past two thousand years".

He wrote three books on icons: L'icône: Image de l'Invisible (1981), Les icônes Byzantines de la Mère de Dieu (1992), and Les mystères du Christ: Icônes de la liturgie (2001). All of these books are published by Desclée de Brouwer. The first of these books has been translated from French into many languages; its title in English is The Icon: Image of the Invisible. It is a comprehensive study of the theology and history of the icon, as well as its aesthetics and techniques. It includes technical details and preparations, from pigment colours to selection of wood. Regarding the differences between Western and Eastern religious art, Sendler stated:

Western religious art, indisputably, has dogmatic content and is rooted in Sacred Scripture and Tradition. However, in its forms and techniques it relies to a great extent on the art of one era or another. Eastern art, on the contrary, requires that the artist in his interpretation of a given theme closely adhere to the theological content of Tradition. This Tradition is precise and rich. For this reason the forms created by Byzantine art are always motivated by the eyes of faith, to a greater extent than those created by the Western tradition.

Sendler died in Paris on 17 March 2014, aged 90.

== Frescoes of Sendler in Russicum ==
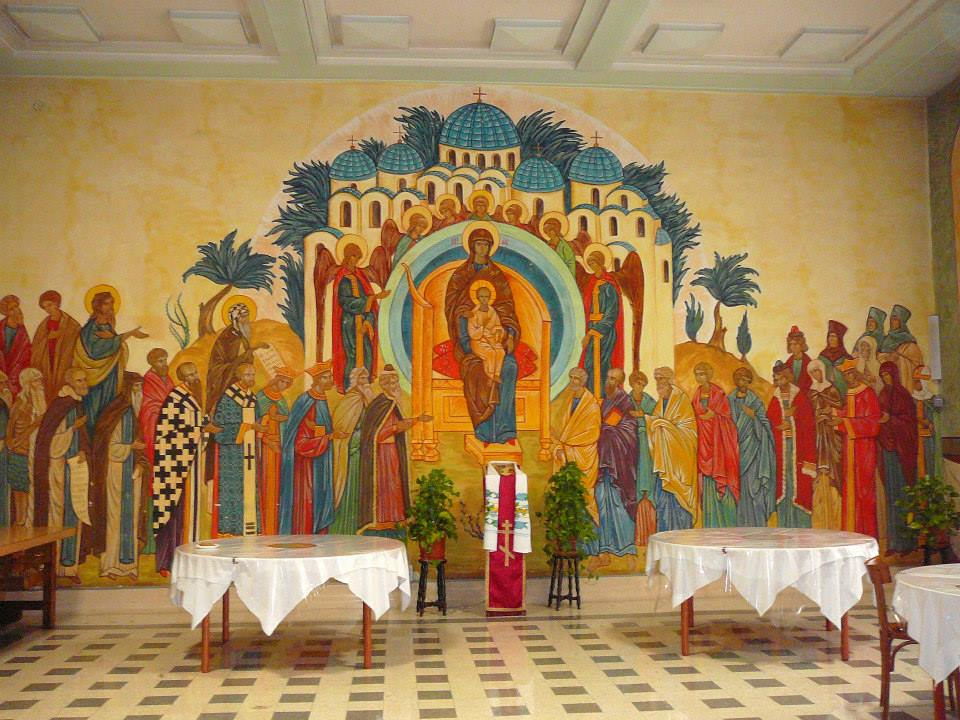

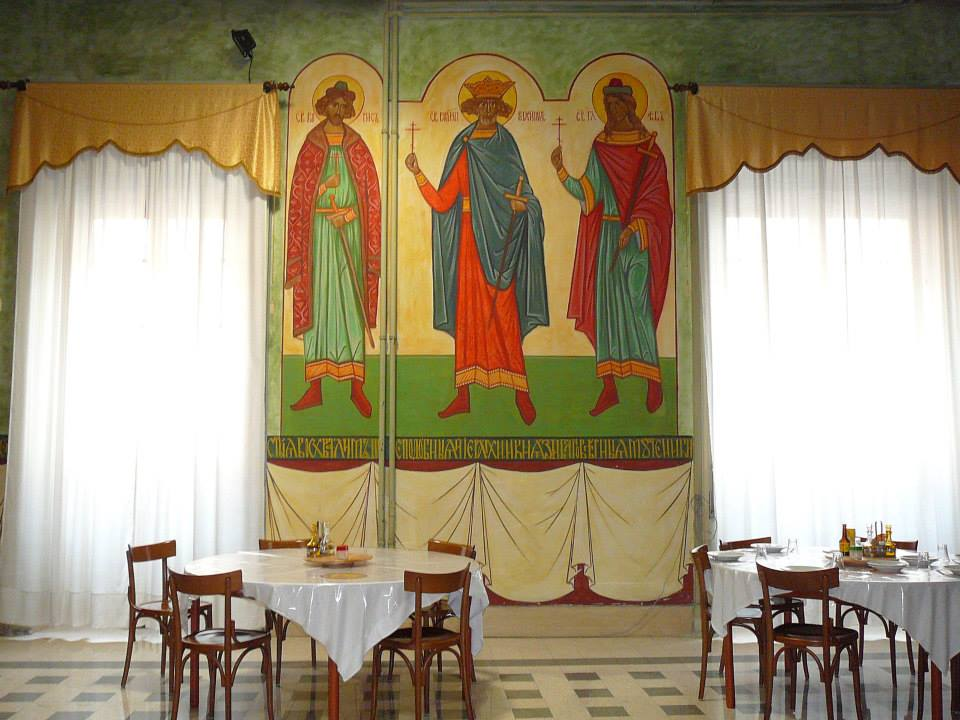

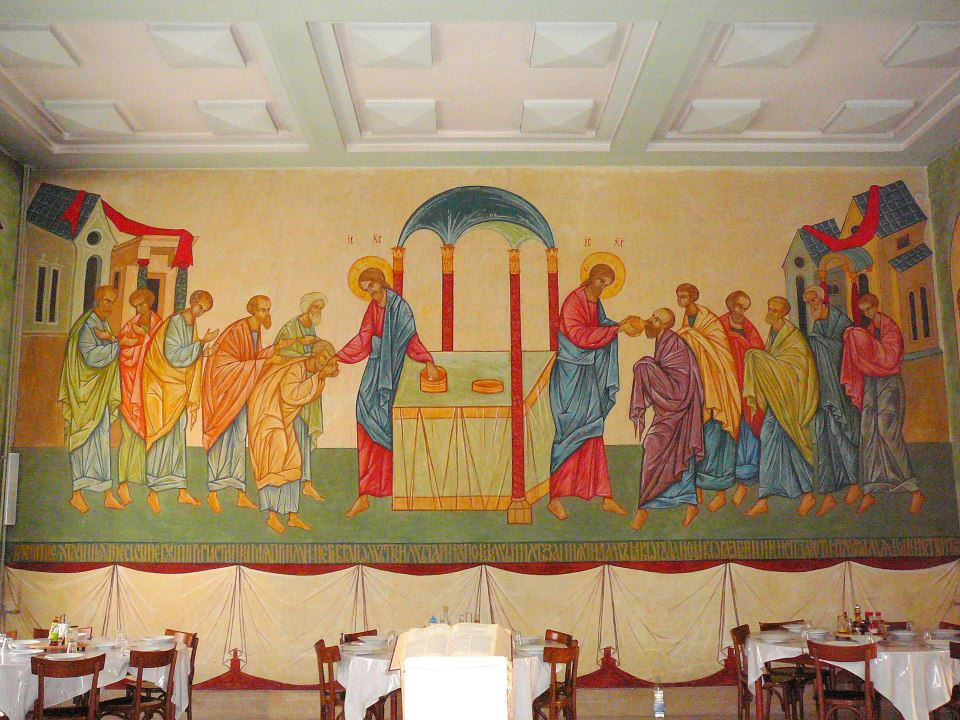

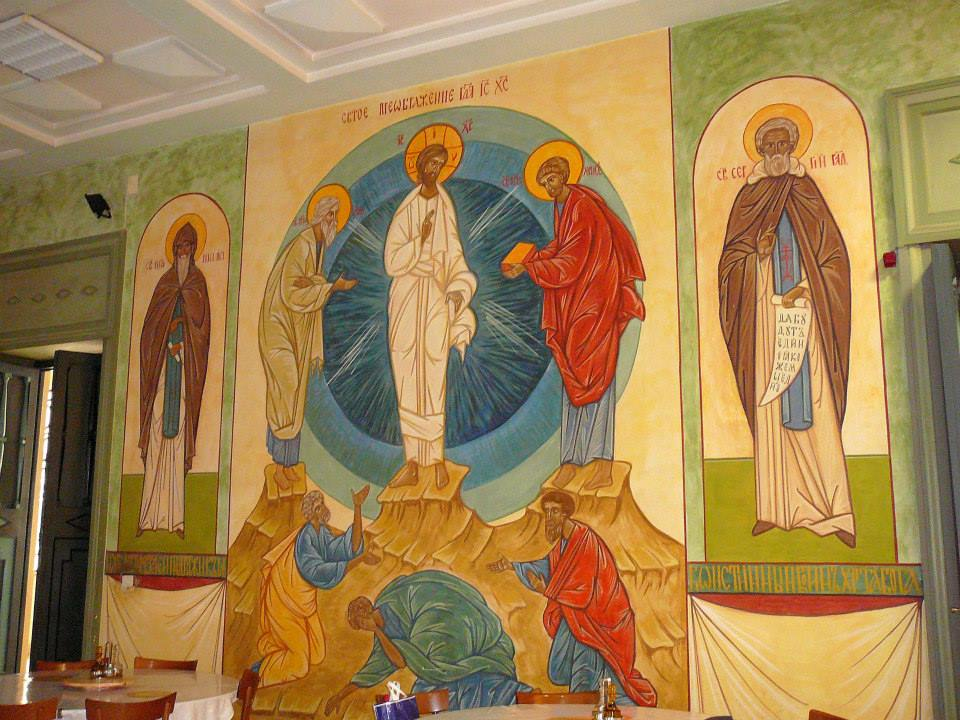

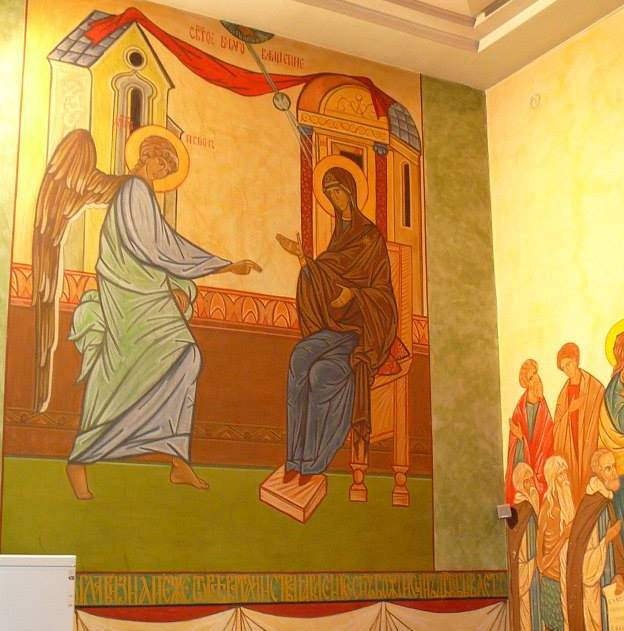
