= Yevgeny Golovin (writer) =

Russian writer, translator, scholar (1938–2010)

- Born: Yevgeny Vsevolodovich Golovin; 26 August 1938
- Died: 29 October 2010 (aged 72)
- Occupations: Writer, poet, translator, literary scholar, cultural theorist, philologist, editor, songwriter, occultist
- Known for: Studies of esotericism, alchemy and traditionalism

Yevgeny Vsevolodovich Golovin (26 August 1938 – 29 October 2010) was a Russian writer, poet, translator and literary scholar. He was also known as an occultist, a specialist in esotericism, a connoisseur of alchemy, a mystic, a songwriter, cultural theorist and philologist.

== Biography ==
Golovin came from the Russian aristocratic Golovin family. Together with Yuri Mamleev, Aleksandr Dugin and Heydar Dzhemal, he belonged to the so-called "Yuzhinsky Circle", a circle of acquaintances who gathered in Yuzhinsky Lane in Moscow, in the communal apartment where Mamleev lived. Golovin took over as leader of this group after Mamleev emigrated to the United States in 1974 and became a sort of spiritual guru. In 1974, he organized and headed a circle called the "Black Order of SS". The circle consisted of former members of the Yuzhinsky Circle. He named himself Führer of the Order.

He was a researcher of traditionalist doctrines and a leader of the “Moscow mystical underground” of the 1960s–1980s. He served as editor-in-chief of the journal Splendor Solis ("The Splendour of the Sun") and as curator of the book series "Garfang" ("literature of a disturbing presence").

Songs based on Golovin's lyrics were performed by Vasily Shumov with the band Tsentr, Alexander F. Sklyar with the band Va-Bank, Vyacheslav Butusov with musicians of the band Kino on the album Zvyozdny padl, and by the band Bravo. The performance in 2015 of a romance by Maxim Trefan at the Gnessin Russian Academy of Music brought Golovin's texts into the sphere of academic music.

In the 1990s, Golovin took part in the group Tsentr and wrote an extensive work devoted to the band, the book Sentimental Rage of Rock and Roll.

He lectured on alchemy and esotericism at Alexander Dugin's “New University”.

He was buried at Volkovskoye Cemetery in Mytishchi after his death in 2010.

== Work ==
In his intellectual studies, Golovin was oriented above all toward the Neoplatonic tradition, the philosophy of Hermeticism and the work of the “accursed poets”. He was influenced by traditionalism, especially by René Guénon, whose work The Reign of Quantity and the Signs of the Times made, according to Golovin, an “inexpressible impression” on him. Later, his fascination with Guénon waned, and he turned to the Italian fascist philosopher Julius Evola. He also developed a keen interest in thinkers associated with Nazi occultism. These included the Thule Society and its founder, Rudolf von Sebottendorf; the Ariosophists Guido von List, Jörg Lanz von Liebenfels, and Karl Maria Wiligut; and the scholar Hermann Wirth.

As Alexander Dugin noted in 2015, Golovin “playfully founded a philosophical school. And that is the most valuable thing in Russia from a philosophical point of view”. Dugin also called him the “father of Russian traditionalism”.
