= Geydar Dzhemal =

Russian Islamic activist, philosopher, and poet (1947–2016)

- Гейда́р Джема́ль
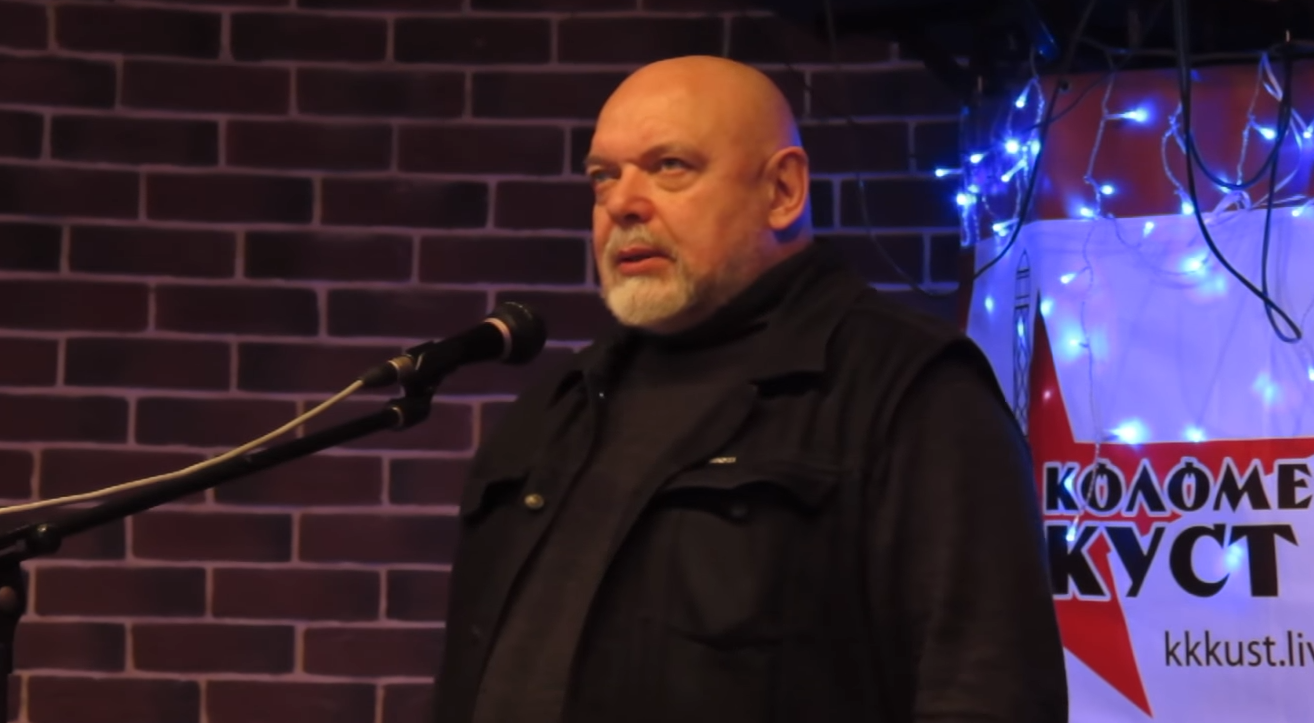
- Dzhemal in 2013
- Born: Geydar Dzahidovich Dzhemal; 10 June 1947; Moscow, Russian SFSR, USSR
- Died: 5 December 2016 (aged 69); Almaty, Kazakhstan
- Citizenship: Russian, Azerbaijani
- Education: Moscow State University (PhD)
- Occupations: Professor, Political activist
- Years active: 1979–2016
- Organization: Islamic Committee of Russia
- Political party: Islamic Renaissance Party; Left Front; The Other Russia
- Movement: Pan-Islamism; Post-Traditionalism; Liberation theology
- Spouse: 2
- Children: Orkhan Dzhemal; Kausar Dzhemal
- Website: http://kontrudar.com/

Signature
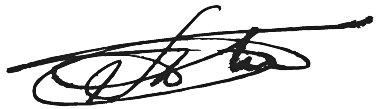

Geydar Dzhahidovich Dzhemal (Russian: Гейда́р Джахи́дович Джема́ль, Azerbaijani: Heydər Cahid oğlu Camal, sometimes transliterated as Heydar Jamal; 6 November 1947 – 5 December 2016) was a Russian-Azerbaijani Islamic philosopher and political activist. He founded and lead the Islamic Committee of Russia, in which he promoted Marxism and non-sectarian pan-Islamism, though formally identifying as a Twelver Shia Muslim. He wrote extensive apologetics in support of Wahhabism and the Salafi movement, participating in the First Chechen War and Tajik Civil War.

He was also founded the Islamic Renaissance Party, was Co-chairman and Presidium member of the Movement "Russian Islamic Heritage," a permanent member of the Popular Arab and Islamic Congress, as well as one of the founders and a member of the Coordinating Council of the Left Front and The Other Russia, taking part in the Dissenters' March.

== Early life and education ==
Dzhemal was born on 6 November 1947 in Moscow. His father was the Azerbaijani artist Dzakhid Dzemal, who is believed to be a descendant of Hulagu Khan, through the branch of Jafar khan Javanshir of Panah Ali Khan's Javanshir tribe. His mother was Irina Shapovalova, a well-known equestrian and horse trainer descended from the noble Shepelev family. His parents divorced when he was very young and he was raised by his maternal grandparents. Dzhemal's maternal grandfather, Igor Shapovalov, was a professor of German philosophy, as well as the director of the Maly Theatre and First Deputy Minister of Culture of the Soviet Union.

In 1965, after graduation from school, Dzhemal entered the Institute of Oriental Languages at Moscow State University, but a year later was expelled for "bourgeois nationalism". He later took a job as an editor at the "Medicine" Publishing House, where he met a Moscow State University graduate, Ilya Moskvin.

== Activist history ==
In the 1960s and 1970s, Dzhemal joined a number of loosely-affiliated bohemian underground organisations (tusovka) associated with Yuri Mamleev. Some members of these groups had access to secret collections of the All-Russia State Library for Foreign Literature and brought works by a number of mystics and philosophers (including well-known esoterists Julius Evola and Alain de Benoist) to these discussions. Through Mameleev, these works became popular among an intellectual strain of Russian neo-Nazism.

Under KGB pressure, the organisation disbanded; to escape compulsory military service, Dzhemal claimed to be schizophrenic and was sent to a psychiatric institution. In 1974, after Mameleev emigrated to the United States, Dzhemal and political analyst Aleksandr Dugin (who Dzhemal later called "a brilliant thinker" and his "former disciple") met with philosopher Evgeniy V. Golovin, who established the "Black Order of the SS". In the late 1980s, both were members of the nationalist Pamyat society, but were excluded for alleged occultism.

Dzhemal later developed his own "post-traditionalist" view after an extensive deep-dive into Hermeticism, and later Marxism, which caused him to distance himself from the occult, becoming more political involved and strict in his Islamic worldview.

== Foray into Islam ==
From 1980, he was a member of the Islamic movement of Tajikistan, and in 1990, joined members of the underground organizations of the Caucasus and Volga regions of Russia in the formation of an umbrella Islamic Revival Party that was active throughout the Soviet Union and whose leadership came from various Islamic traditions. The party alleged that only Soviet Muslims (Turks, Caucasians and Islamised Slavs) would allow the Soviet Union to meaningfully oppose the West. During the Civil War in Tajikistan, Dzhemal worked as an advisor to Davlat Usmon, one of the founders of the Islamic Revival Party of Tajikistan.

In the Islamic Renaissance Party in Astrakhan, he became a deputy chairman of the party. In the same year, he established an information center Tawḥīd and launched the Islamic Russian-language newspaper Al-Waḥdat (Unity).

During the Tajik Civil War of 1992, he was appointed as a political advisor to Vice Premier of the Islamic Democratic Coalition Government led by Davlat Usmon. He was a participant in the Popular Arab and Islamic Conference in Khartoum and consecutively became a member of its permanent council.

Since 1995, the Islamic Council became affiliated with the Union of Muslims of Russia. From 1996 he became advisor to Alexander Lebed and cooperated with him and the Union of Patriotic and National Organisations of Russia to support a block on General Lebedev's presidential campaign.

While being a member of the Central Council СПНОР Djemal was an intermediary between Lebedev and Maskhadov during the First Chechen War. He established connections with Muslim organizations in Europe.

In 1993, Djemal got acquainted with the son of the deceased Ayatollah Khomeini, Ahmad. In the early 1990s, Dzhemal put on a few TV shows on Islamic issues (Nyne (Today), Minaret, etc.). In May 1994, Djemal's documentary, Islamic Republic of Iran, was broadcast by the Russian channels Pervij and The First creating a political scandal which resonated with anti-Iran sentiments in Russia.

In 2010 Dzhemal commented on the Armenian-Azerbaijani Nagorno-Karabakh conflict. He was also among the 34 first signatories of an online anti-Vladimir Putin manifesto, "Putin Must Go", published on 10 March 2010.

Djemal died on 5 December 2016 in Almaty.

On 30 July 2018, his son, journalist Orkhan Dzhemal, was killed along with film director and cameraman while filming a documentary about the activities of a Russian paramilitary organization Wagner Group in the Central African Republic.

== Religious views ==
=== Shi'ism ===
The Islamic scholar Roman Silantyev and the journalist Yulia Latynina said that Jamal professed Shia Islam and that he was a Jafari in Fiqh. He also expressed positive views about Khomeinism and Wilayat al-Faqih during his exchanges with Ahmad Khomeini.

The Internet portal "Voice of Islam" said:

"In the last years of his life Heydar, by the grace of Allah, made a sharp and difficult turn for him in moral and intellectual respect - to his umma, what it is and what it was throughout its history. Being for many years not just a Shia, but the most striking and convincing Russian-speaking Shia, he realized in the midst of Jihad in Sham that Shia and Shi'ism had become a force against Islam and umma, made a decisive choice in favor of the latter. This choice was especially valuable, given what was being done at a time when Heydar already knew that he was seriously ill and perhaps realized that his earthly path was running out."

=== Statement on Theology ===
Regarding responses to a lecture he gave in Almaty in 2008, he made a statement saying:

Recently, many people have asked me about my belonging to one direction or another within Islam. Some people say, “We agree with you in many ways, but you are Shia. Oh, if you weren’t Shia!” To once and for all remove any questions that arise in the brothers [i.e about religious views], I officially declare the following:

1. I follow myself [only] and support all who follow the Quran and the authentic Sunnah of the Prophet.
2. I stand for the complete and inseparable theological and political unity of all Muslims on the platform of Jihad in the path of Allah until all religion on The Earth belongs to Him Alone.
3. I do not follow any of the living Shi'ite Maraji'.
4. I categorically reject pantheism and the Sufi Aqidah based on it and the teachings of Muhammad Ibn Arabi, which is also the basis of the Irfan of the Qom Seminary.
5. I do not curse any of the Rashidun, may Allah be pleased with them.
6. I believe in all directions of Islam, created by sincere Muslims making efforts in the way of Allah, except for their misconceptions, in which there is a grain of truth, which will be reprimanded in the 73 Sects, designed to carry out the complete victory of Muslims over Dajjal under the leadership of the expected Mahdi (whose arrival is agreed upon by all sects of the Muslims).

== Political analysis and philosophy ==
Dzhemal's political analyses have been characterized in various ways. Some have seen it as an Islamic style of Marxism, whereas others have linked his views to fundamentalist Islam, or a combination of both. The names of his informational outlets (Tawḥīd and Al-Waḥdat, meaning "monotheism" and "unity") are key aspects of Salafism. He has attempted to bridge differences between Shiism and Sunnism: in 1999, Dzhemal emphasized the "inner spirit" of Shia Islam and the "outer" geopolitical dimension preserved in Sunnism, presenting them as parts of a greater whole, while also claiming that these differences were "already being washed away".

== List of works ==
Year	Title	Publisher	ISBN	Language
1981	Orientation - North	Ultra.Kultura	ISBN 5-98042-018-5	(in Russian)
2003	The Revolution of the Prophets	Ultra.Kultura	ISBN 5-98042-018-5	(in Russian)
2004	Exemption of Islam	UMMA	ISBN 5-98587-006-5	(in Russian)
2004	A Window Into the Night. Poems	Ekaterinburg: Ultra.Kultura	ISBN 5-9681-0020-6	(in Russian)
2005	Islamic Intellectual Initiative in the 20th Century (under the general editorship of Mr. Dzhemal)	UMMAH	ISBN 5-98587-017-0	(in Russian)
2010	Dawud vs Jalut (David vs. Goliath)	Social and Political Thought	ISBN 978-5-91579-046-8	(in Russian)
2010	Wall of Zulkarnayn	Social and Political Thought	ISBN 978-5-91579-047-5	(in Russian)
2010	Fusils and Karamultuks	Social and Political Thought	ISBN 978-5-91579-040-6	(in Russian)
