= Hradisko =

- Municipality
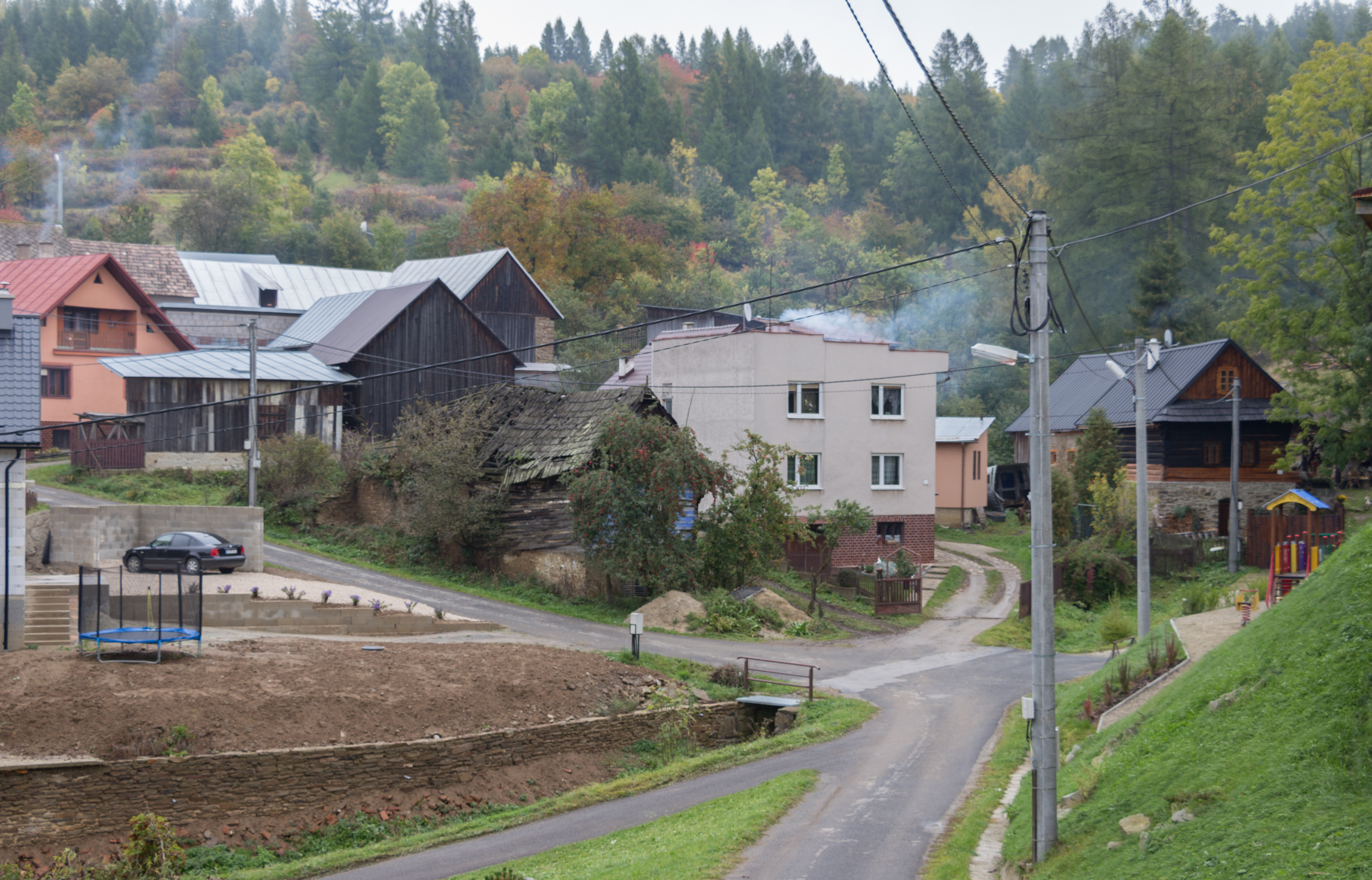

- Flag

- Location of Hradisko in the Prešov Region Location of Hradisko in Slovakia
- Coordinates: 49.06°N 20.52°E
- Country: Slovakia
- Region: Prešov Region
- District: Kežmarok District
- First mentioned: 1264

Area
  - Total: 2.63 km^{2} (1.02 sq mi)
- Elevation: 840 m (2,760 ft)

Population (2025)
  - Total: 102
- Time zone: UTC+1 (CET)
  - Summer (DST): UTC+2 (CEST)
- Postal code: 597 1
- Area code: +421 52
- Vehicle registration plate (until 2022): KK
- Website: obechradisko.webnode.sk

Hradisko (Hungarian: Kisvár, German: Kuntschhöfchen, Rusyn: Градїско) is a village and municipality in Kežmarok District in the Prešov Region of northeastern Slovakia.

== History ==
In historical records the village was first mentioned in 1264. Before the establishment of independent Czechoslovakia in 1918, Hradisko was part of Szepes County within the Kingdom of Hungary. From 1939 to 1945, it was part of the Slovak Republic. On 27 January 1945, the Red Army dislodged the Wehrmacht from Hradisko in the course of the Western Carpathian offensive and it was once again part of Czechoslovakia.

== Geography ==
The municipality lies at an altitude of 840 metres (2,760 ft) and covers an area of 2.63 km^{2} (1.02 sq mi) (2025).

== See also ==
- List of municipalities and towns in Slovakia
- Ján Kellner, Slovak missionary to USSR, born in Hradisko, 1912

== Population ==
Population statistic (10 years)
Year	1995	2005	2015	2025
Count	111	103	99	102
Difference		−7.20%	−3.88%	+3.03%

Population statistic
Year	2024	2025
Count	98	102
Difference		+4.08%

It has a population of 102 people (31 December 2025).

=== Ethnicity ===
Census 2021 (1+ %)
Ethnicity	Number	Fraction
Slovak	96	100%
Total	96	

In year 2021 was 96 people by ethnicity 96 as Slovak.

Note on population: The difference values of population numbers in the table "Population statistic" and in the sections "Ethnicity" & "Religion" is caused by the use of various statistical methods.

=== Religion ===
Census 2021 (1+ %)
Religion	Number	Fraction
Roman Catholic Church	93	96.88%
Eastern Orthodox Church	1	1.04%
Not found out	1	1.04%
None	1	1.04%
Total	96	

In year 2021 was 96 people by religion 93 from Roman Catholic Church, 1 from Eastern Orthodox Church, 1 from Not found out and 1 from None.

== Genealogical resources ==
The records for genealogical research are available at the state archive "Statny Archiv in Levoca, Slovakia"

- Roman Catholic church records (births/marriages/deaths): 1674-1900 (parish B)
- Lutheran church records (births/marriages/deaths): 1874-1944 (parish B)
