= Yuri Mamleev =

Russian writer (1931-2015)

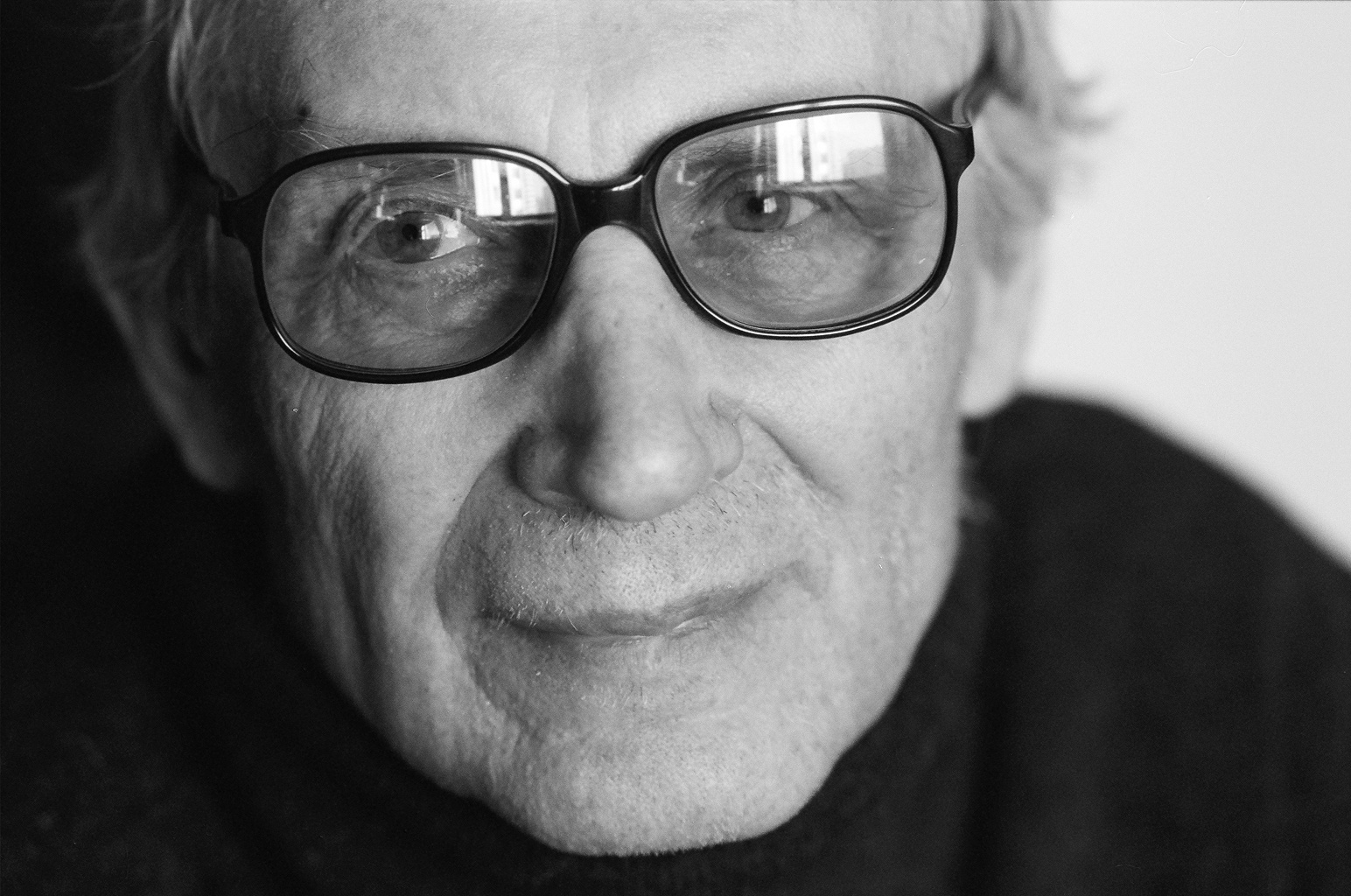
- Born: 11 December 1931; Moscow, USSR
- Died: 25 October 2015 (aged 83); Moscow, Russia
- Writing career
- Genre: Metaphysical realism
- Notable work: The Sublimes (1966) The Fate of the Existence Eternal Russia

Yuri Vitalyevich Mamleev, also Mamleyev or Mamleiev (Russian: Юрий Витальевич Мамлеев, 11 December 1931 – 25 October 2015), was a prominent Russian novelist who began writing in the 1960s and won the Pushkin Prize in 2000. He is considered the founder of metaphysical realism as a literary genre. His best known work, The Sublimes (Russian: Шатуны), was a samizdat novel published in 1966 and translated into English in 2014 by Marian Schwartz.

Mamleev was also well known as the founder of the Yuzhinsky Circle, an occultist, underground literary salon based out of his shared apartment on Yuzhinsky Lane in central Moscow. The illegal literary salon attracted many non-conformist and anti-Soviet artists, writers, intellectuals, and poets, including the future philosopher Aleksandr Dugin, Yevgeny Golovin, and Geydar Dzhemal. He was deeply interested in Hindu and Buddhist doctrines and went on to lecture at Institut national des langues et civilisations orientales in Paris and Moscow State University. Following Mamleev's immigration to the United States, Golovin took over leadership of the group.

In 1974, Mamleev left the USSR and emigrated to the United States where he taught at Cornell University until circa 1980. In 1983, he officially received permanent resident status in France, and lived in Paris over the next ten years. In 1993, he returned to Moscow where he continued to live and write until his death in 2015.

== Writings ==
Mamleev was strongly influenced by Dostoyevsky's themes and portrayals, such as those of death and evil. Psychopathology was also prevalent in Mamleev's works. The writer Sergey Mikhalkov commented that his characters' lives resembled a "history of illness of some schizophrenic" and his monstrous creations are an "absurd, devil's hallucination". His works were extremely popular in the non-conformist circles in Moscow.

In Mamleev's metaphysical realist worldview, social reality, a falsehood of material illusions from which humans must break free, is contrasted with metaphysical reality, which truly defines both the world and human nature. With the creation of the Yuzhinsky Circle, he attempted to assemble a group of thinkers who were building 'metaphysical selfhood' and a gnostic-spiritual awakening'.
