= Goffredo da Alatri =

Italian nobleman, city leader, and Roman Catholic cardinal

- Cardinal-Deacon of San Giorgio in Velabro
- Church: Catholic Church
- See: San Giorgio in Velabro
- In office: 17 December 1261 – c. 1287
- Predecessor: Pietro Capocci
- Successor: Pietro Peregrosso

Orders
- Created cardinal: 17 December 1261 by Pope Urban IV

Personal details
- Born: Alatri, Campagna e Marittima, Papal States
- Died: April/May 1287 Rome, Papal States

Goffredo da Alatri, also called Goffredo di Alatri or Goffredo di Raynaldo (died April or May 1287), was an Italian nobleman, city leader and Roman Catholic cardinal. He was podestà (chief magistrate) of his native Alatri, a small town in the mountains, east of Anagni, in the last two years of his life.

== Early career ==
Goffredo di Raynaldo was born at Alatri. He is attested as a canon of the Cathedral of Alatri in 1229. He was also Canon of the Cathedral of Lisbon.

In 1251 he is mentioned as a chaplain of Cardinal Stefano de Normandis of the titulus of Santa Maria in Trastevere, and granted the privilege of being Dean of the Cathedral of Olensis (Holum or Holar, in Iceland) and rector of the church of S. Stefano in Alatri at the same time. He was the Fundator et Auctor of that church, according to an inscription at S. Stefano.

In 1257 he is on record as a chaplain of Pope Alexander IV and judge in a case between the Bishop of Ascoli and a certain Rinaldo.

== Cardinal ==
Goffredo da Alatri was created cardinal-deacon in the Consistory of 17 (or 24) December, 1261, by Pope Urban IV (Jacques Panteleon). He was assigned the Deaconry of San Giorgio in Velabro (ad velum aureum), which he held for the rest of his life.

On 5 May 1265, Pope Clement IV confirmed a judgment given by Cardinal Goffredo in favor of Roger de Frescobaldi, secular Prior of S. Lorenzo in Florence. On 21 May 1265, he was present in Consistory when an agreement, which had been reached among parties from Perugia over a financial dispute that had arisen during the Sede Vacante of 1261 (25 May – 29 August), was finally ratified by the Pope. On 16 June 1265, he was present in the Roman Curia and was one of eleven cardinals who subscribed a bull of Pope Clement in favor of the monastery of S. Angelo in Donica in the diocese of Camerino; and similarly on 7 July for the monastery of Fructuariensis; and again on 31 July for the monastery of S. Gertrude in Cologne. In 1267, he presided over the negotiations which led to a treaty between the Guelphs and Ghibbelines of the city of Siena, signed on 13 May 1267. Pope Clement IV, who was residing in Viterbo, confirmed the document on 30 May 1267.

He was present at the Second Ecumenical Council of Lyons in 1274. He was one of the cardinals travelling in the suite of Pope Gregory X as he returned to Rome after the Council, and was present at the taking of the Oath of Fealty by Rudolf King of the Romans at Lausanne on October 20, 1275.

In 1276, under Pope John XXI, Cardinal Goffredo became involved in the long-running contest, which had begun under Gregory X, over the election of an Abbot for the monastery of Crassensis (La Grasse) in the diocese of Carcassonne; Goffredo acted as judge of the appeals and rendered the final ruling, which was confirmed by Pope Nicholas III on 12 June 1279. In the same way, Goffredo was named as Auditor (judge) in the case of a lawsuit involving the Bishop of Clonfert and the Bishop of Down in Ireland by Pope John XXI (1276–1277); on 26 June 1279, citations to appear at the Roman Curia were still being issued by the Cardinal.

He was among the cardinals present at a Consistory at S. Peter's on 4 May 1278, when Fr. Conradus, O.Min., the ambassador of Rudolf King of the Romans, officially confirmed the oaths and agreements undertaken at Lausanne. He subscribed several letters of Pope Nicholas III., and the bull which regulated the activities of the Canons of the Vatican Basilica. In the Spring of 1279 Cardinal Goffredo also served as an examiner of bishops in the case of the appointment of Andreas, a chaplain of Cardinal Jacopo Savelli and Canon of Reate, as Bishop of Sora.

In February, 1281, before a coronation could be arranged for Pope Martin IV, Cardinal Goffredo and Cardinal Latino Malabranca Orsini were sent to Rome 'velut pacis angelis'. The mission was a failure, and the coronation had to be held in Orvieto. In the Winter of 1282/1283 Cardinal Goffredo was a member of a cardinalatial commission to examine the election of a bishop of Osimo; both the election and the qualifications of the candidate were approved, and Pope Martin granted his confirmation.

On 24 September 1284, he was named Protector of the Abbey of S. Andrea de Fractis (?) in Rome. On 9 September 1285, he was a member of a committee of three cardinals who were examiners of the election of the Abbot of the monastery of S. Pietro di Monteneronis. He subscribed the "Constitution for the Good Government of Sicily" at Tivoli on 17 September 1285 as "Gottifridus Sancti Georgii ad velum aureum diaconus cardinalis".

On 7 March 1286, he was assigned by Pope Honorius IV the happy duty of investing Filippo, the new Archbishop of Salerno, with the pallium, at the tomb of S. Peter in the Vatican Basilica. On 15 May 1286, he was assigned to perform the same function for Heinrich, Archbishop of Mainz. On 5 May 1286 he was present at a Consistory at Santa Sabina on the Aventine in Rome, and subscribed a bull in favor of the Order of the Brothers Hermits of S. William. On 7 May, he subscribed for the monastery of Fiscannensis In 1286, Cardinal Goffredo became Podestà of Alatri, and he served in this office as town mayor until his death. On his death, the town descended into anarchy.

== Conclave of 1287 and death ==
Pope Honorius IV died on Holy Thursday, 3 April 1287, at his palace next to Santa Sabina on the Aventine. There were sixteen cardinals at the time of his death, and they would have assembled for a conclave in mid-April. However, Cardinal Comes Giusiani de Casati died on 7 or 8 April. During the next several months nearly all the cardinals became ill, and several more died: Hugh of England (died July 28), Gervaise of Paris, Giordano Orsini, Geoffrey de Bar, and Goffredo da Alatri. The cardinals scattered to recuperate, first to their own residences, and finally to hilltop towns in the neighborhood of Rome. The conclave was forgotten until the cold of winter ended the pestilence which had been afflicting Rome, probably mosquito-borne malarial fever. It was only in mid-February, 1288, that the surviving Cardinals reassembled; there were seven electors left: Latino Malabranca, Bentivenga de Bentivengis, Girolamo Masci, Bernard de Languissel, Matteo Rosso Orsini, Giacomo Colonna, and Benedetto Caetani. They elected Girolamo Masci, O. Min. as Nicholas IV on February 22. But Cardinal Goffredo was already dead before 31 May 1287.

Cardinal Goffredo possessed fifty-two books at his death, according to the inventory of his property made on 31 May 1287, of which twenty-three were juridical in nature.

== Bibliography ==
- Lorenzo Cardella, Memorie storiche de' cardinali della Santa Romana Chiesa Tomus I, 2 (Roma 1792), pp. 302–303.
- Marcel Prou, "Inventaire des meubles du cardinal Geoffroy d'Alatri," Mélanges d'archéologie et d'histoire de l'École Française de Rome 5 (1885), pp. 382–411.
- G. Zander, "Il palazzo del cardinale Gottifredo ad Alatri," Palladium II (1952), pp. 109–112.
- G. Marchetti Longhi, "Il cardinale Gottifredo di Alatri, la sua famiglia, il suo stemma ed il suo palazzo," Archivio della Società romana di storia patria 85 (1952), pp. 17–49.
- Fulvio Delle Donne, "GOFFREDO di Alatri," Dizionario Biografico degli Italiani Volume 57 (2001). (in Italian)
- Andreas Fischer, Kardinäle im Konklave. die lange Sedisvakanz der Jahre 1268 bis 1271 (Berlin 2008), pp. 126–132.
