= Ján Kellner =

Catholic Priest

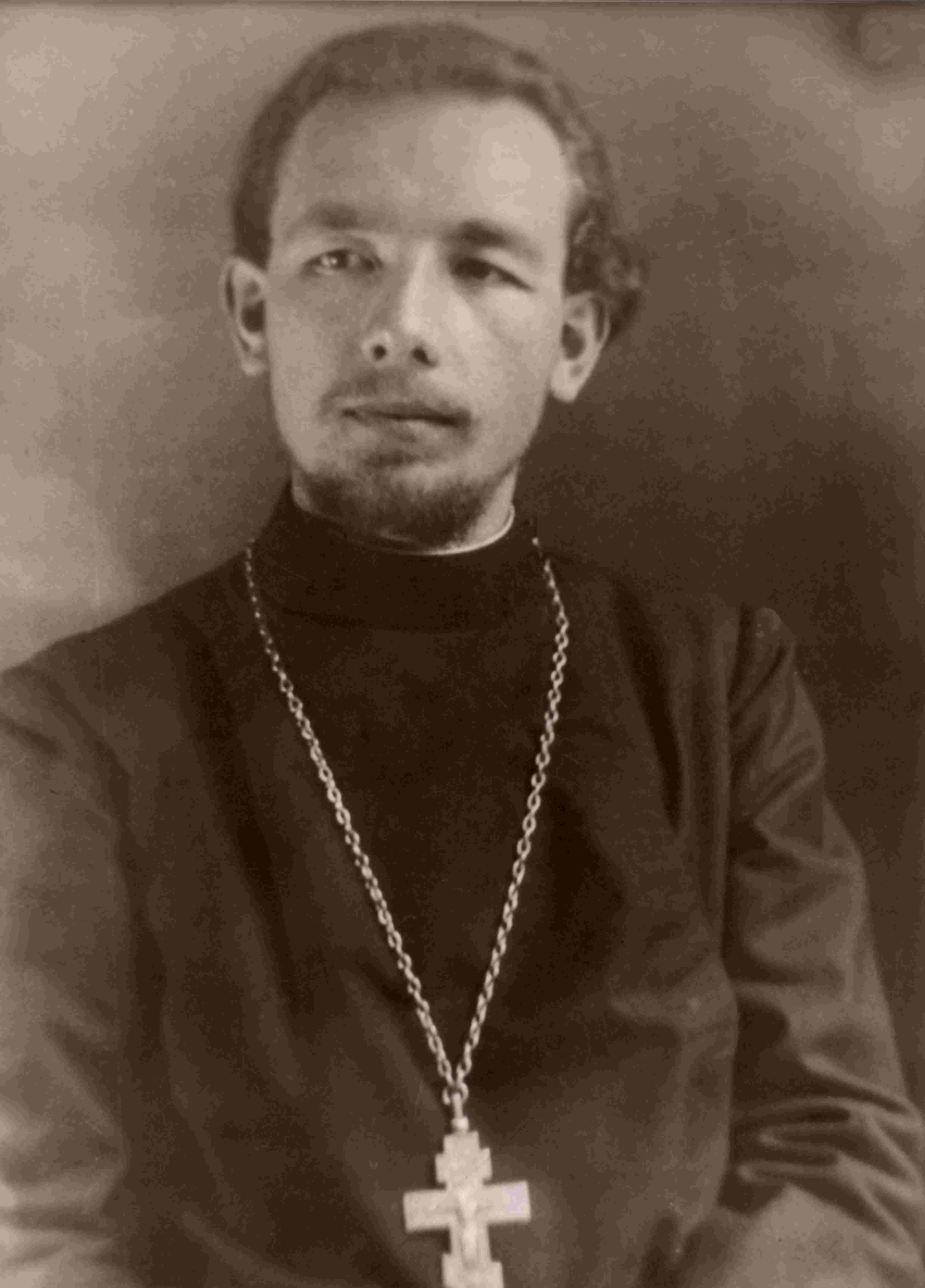
- Born: December 26, 1912; Hradisko, Austria-Hungary
- Died: July 7, 1941 (aged 28); Kiev, USSR
- Cause of death: Execution by shooting
- Other names: Jan Kellner Brincko, Jan Kellner Brinsko, Jan Kölner-Brinsko, Jan Andreevich Kellner Brinsko
- Occupation: Catholic Priest
- Title: Religious, priest & missionary

Ján Kellner (December 26, 1912–July 7, 1941) was a Slovak Catholic priest, missionary to USSR, executed during Stalinism in 1941.

== Early life and studies ==
Ján Kellner was born in Hradisko (Kisvár), Austria-Hungary, today Slovakia in 1912, near the town of Levoča, where his family subsequently moved in 1922. He started attending the Catholic boys' elementary school and a year later the Gymnasium in Levoča, from which he graduated in 1931. In 1931, he left for Rome to study at Collegium Russicum. After two years of study of Philosophy and four years of study of Theology at the Pontifical Gregorian University he was ordained priest on December 25, 1937 (according to other sources, on January 1, 1937). For two more years he studied at the Pontifical Oriental Institute and in 1939, he relocated to the Augustinian monastery in Prague to serve at a Russian/Ruthenian Catholic parish, with the prospect of passage to Russia. At the beginning of WWII, on demand of the Gestapo and under the threat of forceful deportation, he left for Slovakia, where he worked in a paper factory in Ružomberok.

== Passage to Soviet Union, captivity and death ==
In November 1940, Ján Kellner received a letter from the Jesuit Superior Wlodimir Ledóchowski to bishop Michal Buzalka stating that the passage to USSR for Ján Kellner was prepared. Subsequently, Ján Kellner was issued a false passport under the name 'Relovský'. Theodore Romzha, later bishop and martyr, dissuaded him from clandestine passage for the great dangers it posed; despite his advice, on December 6, 1940, he crossed the border into USSR.

In spite of the spiritual and pastoral nature of their mission, the secret service of the Soviet Union considered Catholic missionaries to the USSR educated in the Collegium Russicum to be spies of the Vatican, and treated them as such. Ján Kellner was arrested on December 9, 1940, after being handed to the authorities by a peasant he had approached for help. His initial interrogation lasted three days and three nights (December 17–19, 1940). He stated in detail that he had been preparing for a long time for his mission into the USSR, and that he planned to "cross the border in the region of Sambor, and then secretly make his way to Lwów. From there he would go to Moscow and get a job at some factory, and then he planned to attend meetings of militant atheists and speak out against atheism." He would do this with the intention of "preaching the teaching of Christ among young people, in order to foster the work of unifying the Churches." He was subsequently transferred to the special NKVD prison in Kiev, where he was subjected to a total of thirteen interrogation sessions. Following the attack of Nazi Germany on USSR on June 22, 1941 and triggered by an internal command from Moscow to review the lists of those arrested by the NKVD to identify those suitable for execution, he was sentenced to capital punishment as "an enemy of the people" on July 7, 1941, and shot dead the same day.

By the decision of the Attorney of the Ukrainian SSR no. 1067/1989 from June 16, 1989, the case of Ján Kellner (arch. #64851) was made subject of the Decree of the Presidium of the Supreme Soviet of USSR from January 16, 1989, regarding the victims of persecution in 1930's, 1940's and the beginning of 1950's, hence rehabilitating Ján Kellner.

== Veneration ==
A plaque commemorating the life and death of Ján Kellner has been installed in the ante-hall of the church in his native village of Hradisko.
