= Flavius Valila Theodosius =

Flavius Valila Theodosius or Theodobius (died before 483) was a Roman senator and military commander who held the office of magister militum in the west in 471. Valila, who was of Gothic origin, endowed a Christian church on his property near Tibur. At his death, he bequeathed the 4th century basilica of Junius Annius Bassus (consul of 331) on the Esquiline Hill in Rome to the Church, and Pope Simplicius dedicated it to St. Andrew, which later came to be known as Sant'Andrea Catabarbara.
