= Shepelev =

Shepelev (Russian: Шепелев) is a Russian masculine surname, its feminine counterpart is Shepeleva. Notable people with the surname include:

- Anton Shepelew (born 1989), Belarusian football player
- Sergei Shepelev (born 1955), Russian ice hockey player
- Svetlana Șepelev-Tcaci (born 1969), Moldovan long-distance runner
- Volodymyr Shepelyev (born 1997), Ukrainian football player

== See also ==
- shevelev
