= Alex Shevelev =

Russian priest

Personal details
- Born: March 16, 1896 Odessa, Russian Empire
- Died: November 13, 1974 (aged 78) Rome, Italy

Alex (Alexei) Shevelev (born March 16, 1896 – died on November 13, 1974) was an Archpriest, a priest of the Russian Orthodox Church, then the Russian Catholic Church, religious journalist for Vatican Radio, the participant Russian apostolate and leader of Russians abroad.

== Biography ==
Shevelev's mother was a descendant of the Italian ducal Graf Galleano (Galeano) of Genoa. In 1914 Shevelev graduated from the Odessa Military School and from 1915 he took part in the First World War, where he was wounded and shell-shocked. In 1920 he entered the Odessa Orthodox Theological Seminary and in 1921 Shevelev was ordained priest in Kirovohrad. In 1931 Shevelev was arrested, released in 1937, worked as a tour guide in Kerch and studied by correspondence at the Historical and Archaeological Institute in Leningrad. During World War II, he and his family was in Germany, working for the U.S. military stock. In Munich, came into contact with the Russian Catholic center and in 1948 he with his wife moved to Catholicism after that he moved to Rome, where he began to broadcast on Vatican Radio. The first radio program was broadcast in Russian on 19 April 1948, for the next 20 years Shevelev led the Russian transmissions on Vatican Radio. In 1969 he retired, but in 1973 went on to lead the religious program. Shevelev was joined in 1963 Bishop Andrei Katkov in the commission of the Liturgy of St. John Chrysostom in the Cathedral of Saint Peter, Rome. Shevelev died on July 5, 1974, in his apartment in Russicum.
