= Sant'Andrea Catabarbara =

Church building in Rome, Italy

Coordinates: 41°53′49″N 12°30′01″E

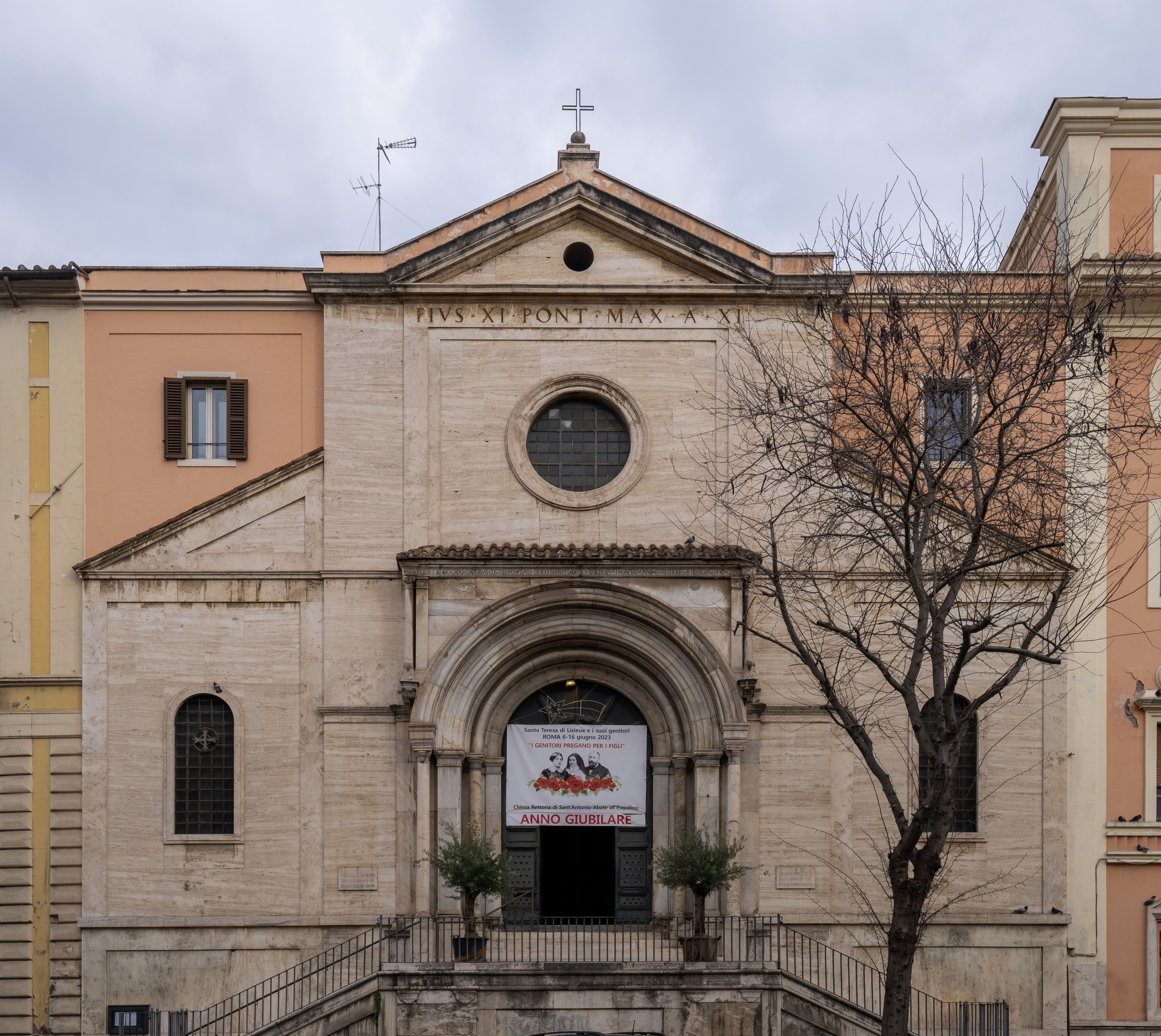
- Site of the former church on Esquiline Hill, now occupied by the Pontifical Oriental Institute
- Sant'Andrea Catabarbara
- Location: Rome, Italy
- Country: Italy
- Denomination: Roman Catholic

History
- Status: Demolished (1930)
- Founded: 5th century
- Founder: Pope Simplicius
- Dedication: Andrew the Apostle

Architecture
- Architectural type: Rectangular aula, later converted to a church
- Demolished: 1930

Administration
- Diocese: Diocese of Rome

Sant'Andrea Catabarbara was a church in Rome, located on what is now the site of the Pontifical Oriental Institute on Via Napoleone III, in the Esquilino district. It was first called Catabarbara or Cata Barbara Patricia in the eighth century.

It was the first devotional church dedicated to Saint Andrew in the city of Rome. Its foundation probably dates to the donation of an aula or hall from the home of Junius Annius Bassus, consul in the year 331, by the Goth general Valila. An inscription from the apse of the church possibly records the donation, though its meaning is uncertain. The church was therefore the result of the transformation from a secular home or house-church into a church, due to the work of Pope Simplicius in the second half of the fifth century. The hall was turned into a monastery to serve the nearby Basilica of Santa Maria Maggiore. It and its rich decoration were demolished to build the Pontifical Oriental Institute in 1930.

== Bibliography ==
- Mariano Armellini, Le chiese di Roma dal secolo IV al XIX, Roma 1891, pp. 815-817.
