= Nina Ivanovna Petrovskaya =

Russian writer and memoirist (1879–1928)

Nina Petrovskaya
- Нина Ивановна Петровская
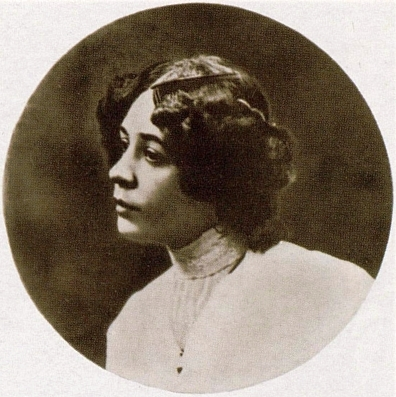
- Born: March 1879; Moscow, Russian Empire
- Died: 23 February 1928 (aged 48); Paris, France
- Occupations: Writer, translator, memoirist
- Partner: Sergei Sokolov-Krechetov
- Writing career
- Language: Russian
- Notable work: Sanctus Amor (1908)
- Movement: Symbolism

Nina Ivanovna Petrovskaya (Russian: Нина Ивановна Петровская, March 1879 – 23 February 1928) was a Russian writer, translator and memoirist who moved at the centre of the Symbolist circles of early twentieth-century Moscow. She is remembered above all as the prototype for Renata in Valery Bryusov's novel The Fiery Angel and as one corner of the love triangle the book grew out of, with Bryusov and Andrei Bely.

== Early years and literary debut ==
Petrovskaya was born in Moscow into the family of a minor official. She finished dental courses but never practised, and her first prose piece appeared in 1903 in the almanac Grif, run by the poet and publisher Sergei Sokolov-Krechetov. She became Sokolov-Krechetov's common-law partner and helped run the Grif press, one of the small Moscow houses that brought out the second wave of Russian Symbolists. Stories of hers soon followed in Vesy, Zolotoe Runo and Russkaya Mysl.

Alexander Blok noted in his diary that she was clever and pleasant company. Vladislav Khodasevich, who knew her from the same period, later wrote that her real talent lay in the urge to live her own life as if it were a literary text.

== Bryusov and Bely ==
In late 1903 Petrovskaya entered a brief and intense relationship with Andrei Bely, who broke with her after a few months, telling friends he was committed to a higher, mystical love. Bryusov, drawn to her at the same gatherings, took his place. Their affair ran from 1904 to about 1908 and grew around the occult interests they shared. Petrovskaya converted to Roman Catholicism during these years, taking the faith of the heroine she would soon resemble in print.

The rivalry came to a head in the spring of 1905. During the intermission of a public lecture Bely was giving in the small auditorium of the Polytechnic Museum, Petrovskaya drew a Browning revolver on him. By Bely's account the weapon either failed to fire or she turned it on the ceiling, and no one was hurt.

Bryusov reworked the whole episode in The Fiery Angel, serialised in Vesy between 1907 and 1908. He cast Petrovskaya as Renata, Bely as Count Heinrich and himself as the narrator Ruprecht, and dedicated the novel to her with the inscription naming her as one who had loved much and suffered much for love. Petrovskaya signed her own letters Renata from that point on.

Her single book of short prose, Sanctus Amor, came out in Moscow in 1908.

== Emigration ==
Petrovskaya left Russia in the autumn of 1911 and never returned. She lived in Florence, then in Rome from 1913 to 1922, kept afloat by translations from Italian. From the autumn of 1922 she was based in Berlin, where she wrote regularly for the Russian-language paper Nakanune. Her 1924 Russian retelling of Carlo Collodi's Pinocchio, published in Berlin, served as the working basis for Aleksey Tolstoy's loose adaptation The Golden Key, or the Adventures of Buratino.

A long memoir of her years with Bryusov, written after his death in 1924, appeared in fragments in the émigré press.

== Death ==
By 1927 Petrovskaya had moved to Paris together with her sister Nadezhda. The two lived in real poverty, and Nadezhda died at the start of 1928. On 23 February 1928 Petrovskaya killed herself with gas in a small Paris hotel.

Khodasevich devoted to her one of the central chapters of his memoir book Necropolis (1939), titled "The End of Renata", which has remained the main narrative source for her life.

== Legacy ==
The full Bryusov to Petrovskaya correspondence, edited by Nikolai Bogomolov and Aleksandr Lavrov, came out in 2004 from Novoye Literaturnoye Obozreniye and is considered a key document of Russian Symbolism. Sarah Vitali's English translation of Necropolis, published by Columbia University Press in 2019, brought Petrovskaya's story to a wider Anglophone readership. Joan Delaney Grossman's 1994 study of her conflict with Bryusov treats Petrovskaya as a central case in the Symbolist programme of zhiznetvorchestvo, the deliberate fashioning of life as a work of art.
