= Bogomolov =

Bogomolov (masculine, Russian: Богомолов) or Bogomolova (feminine, Russian: Богомоловa) is a Russian surname. Notable people with the surname include:

- Alex Bogomolov Jr., Russian tennis player
- Fedor Bogomolov (born 1946), Russian–American mathematician and professor
- Galina Bogomolova (born 1977), Russian long-distance runner
- Konstantin Bogomolov (born 1975), Russian theater director
- Lyudmila Bogomolova (born 1932), Russian ballet dancer
- Nikolai Bogomolov (born 1991), Russian ice hockey player
- Oleg Bogomolov, Russian politician
- Sergei Bogomolov, Russian soccer player
- Vladimir Bogomolov (writer) (1926–2003), Soviet writer
- Vladimir Bogomolov (bodyguard) (c.1945–2009), Soviet security officer and a bodyguard of Leonid Brezhnev

== See also ==
- Bogomolov conjecture
- Bogomolov-Miyaoka-Yau inequality
