= Sonechka =

1992 novella by Ludmila Ulitskaya

- 1998 edition (English)
- Author: Ludmila Ulitskaya
- Original title: Сонечка
- Translator: Arch Tait
- Language: Russian
- Genre: Fiction
- Publisher: GLAS Publishers
- Publication place: Russia
- Media type: Print
- Pages: 71
- ISBN: 5-7172-0038-2

Sonechka is a novella and collection of short stories by Russian writer Lyudmila Ulitskaya. It was originally published in Russian in the literary journal Novy Mir in 1992, and translated into English by Arch Tait in 2005. Sonechka was nominated for the Russian Booker Prize.

== Plot summary ==
The novella Sonechka tells the life story of a Russian booklover. Sonechka spends her youth immersed in the world of Russian literature, living her life vicariously through the characters in books. One day, when Sonechka is working at the local library, a man named Robert Viktorovich inquires about an ensemble of French books. The 50-year-old man, who is a member of the intelligentsia, returns to the library 3 days later and abruptly proposes to Sonechka. She accepts and embarks on a new life with her husband. She lives a fulfilling life as she moves around Russia with her husband and her daughter Tanya. Eventually, the family settles in the Montmartre of Moscow. Sonechka’s husband gets a studio to work on his paintings and Tanya tumbles around in her studies and distances herself from her mother. However, when Tanya enters afternoon classes, a new girl, Jasia, enters the life of the family. Jasia, a beautiful Polish girl, charms Tanya and Robert. One Christmas Jasia and Robert start an affair. Despite this, Sonechka views the girl as a fragile individual, who becomes the daughter Sonechka always dreamed of having. Suddenly, Robert has a heart attack and dies, leaving Sonechka and Jasia alone. Sonechka prepares for the funeral and takes care of Jasia. By the end of the story, Sonechka rediscovers her love of literature while Tanya relocates to St. Petersburg and Jasia marries a European aristocrat.

== Characters in Sonechka ==
- Sonechka – the protagonist is an introverted, book-loving librarian who meets her future husband, Robert, in the job. Once married she transforms into a domestic woman who showers her family with limitless love, patience, and understanding. Sonechka, Sonya or Sofia means wisdom.
- Robert Victorovich – well known artist and husband of Sonechka – quite prolific, intellectual, and very popular in the creative community, but unfaithful and often condescending to his wife.
- Tanya – self-absorbed daughter of Sonechka and Robert and friend of Jasia who takes after her father. She has a knack for enchanting suitors and dabbling in arts, despite leading a generally vacuous existence.
- Jasia – an orphaned Polish girl whose personality adapts to survive the harsh events of her life. She utilizes her sexuality to manipulate others and/or survive. She is Tanya's friend and Robert's mistress.

== Major Themes ==
- Family, domesticity, and the women's sphere – the novella examines the "prevailing paradigm in Russian culture--one that equates women with maternity and nationhood and, more recently, with the prostitute, while conceiving of culture and cultural production as purely masculine realms."
- Story telling – "...Ulitskaya relies firmly upon the basic, eternal urge of readers to find out 'What happened next?' She tells stories."
- Unpredictability of life – "[Ulitskaya's] works are complex, often weaving several human stories and layering historic events into the lives of gray, little people who lead a banal existence."
- Relationships and love in 20th-century Russia – The story explores the relationships between women with Jasia, Sonechka and Tanya; and relationships between man and woman with Jasia and Robert; and Sonechka and Robert. This is a recurring theme in 20th-century Russian literature.
- The Intellectual/creative lifestyle – Sonechka is based on a known situational construct that brings together a mismatched family, including a creative's wife and his mistress, to live together harmoniously. The unexpected combination of characters manage to coexist by allowing their most admirable traits—wisdom, patience, and will power—to motivate their actions.
- Female perspective – "Liudmila Ulitskaia brigs gender-specific difference back into the reader's consciousness through her very powerful and very feminine protagonists." The novella offers insight into the minds of three strong, female characters, their relationships with Robert, and their relationships with each other. Sonechka's devotion to her family and role as a domesticated woman become central to plot development. Ulitskaya uses unembellished prose to uniquely highlight the inner workings of the female mind and to evoke a new type of discourse about national and gender identity. "As a female writer, Ulitskaya...has openly deemed herself prepared to take the risk of being considered an old-fashioned and sentimental representative of zhenskaia proza.
- Psychoanalytical context – The three main female characters in the novella, Tanya, Jasia, and Sonechka could represent the psychoanalytical ideas of the id, ego, and super ego. Tanya's selfish behavior throughout the story clearly parallels that of the unrestrained id. Jasia creates balance in her life by juggling her dream to be an actress in order to please herself with her drive to please others, thus earning her the label of ego. Lastly, Sonechka's utter devotion to her domestic duties at the expensive of her own needs embodies the superego and completes the three-pronged structure of the psyche.
- Women's experiences – Ulitskaya's writings focus on the personal experiences of women and display unusual psychological insight expressed in straightforward, unornamental language.

== Literary significance ==
Ludmila Ulitskaya gives a novel that is distinctly Russian and a part of the growing literary tradition in Russia of works somewhere between pop culture and intellectual literature. The novella was well-received just shortly after its initial release. Sonechka was nominated for the Russian Booker Prize in 2005. Sonechka is in line with other Sonechkas from Russian literature – such as Dostoyevsky's characters – in kindness and magnanimity. The English translation was shortlisted for the Rossica Translation Prize in 2007.

== Developmental history ==
Sonechka is an early work of Ulitskaya's. It was published in 1992 in the journal Novyi mir (New World) after the author had written literature based on Jewish life and her own childhood experiences.
