= The Fiery Angel =

The Fiery Angel is

- The Fiery Angel (novel), a novel by the Russian poet Valery Bryusov
- The Fiery Angel (opera), an opera by Sergei Prokofiev based on Bryusov's novel
