= Valery Ronshin =

Russian writer

Valery Mikhailovich Ronshin (born c. 1958 – c. 1962) is a Russian writer. He was born in the city of Liski in Voronezh Region, and studied history at Petrozavodsk State University. He has written over 50 books, both for adults and for children. His work follows in the absurdist tradition of Daniil Kharms, and has been translated into several languages, including in English under the Glas New Russian Writing imprint.

He lives in St. Petersburg.
