= Vladimir Bogomolov =

Vladimir Bogomolov may refer to:

- Vladimir Bogomolov (writer) (1926–2003), Soviet writer
- Vladimir Bogomolov (bodyguard) (c. 1945–2009), Soviet security officer and a bodyguard of Leonid Brezhnev
