= Rossica Translation Prize =

- Awarded for: Rewarding the best translation to English of a literary work in Russian.
- Location: London
- Country: England
- Presented by: Academia Rossica
- First award: 2005
- Website: www.academia-rossica.org

The Rossica Translation Prize is a biennial award given to an exceptional published translation of a literary work from Russian into English. It is the only prize in the world for Russian to English literary translations.

== History of the prize ==
The prize was inaugurated in 2003 by Academia Rossica and has been presented since 2005. The distinction comes with a cash prize, which is split between the translator and the publisher at the discretion of the panel of judges. In previous years, the prize has been awarded in London on 24 May, the birth date of Saints Cyril and Methodius, creators of the Slavic alphabet. It is now awarded as part of the SLOVO Russian Literature Festival. Excerpts of the winning and runner-up translations are printed in an accompanying Rossica journal.

Since 2009, the Academia Rossica has also been awarding the annual Rossica Young Translators Prize for anyone under 25.

== Shortlist and winners ==
The winner is marked with a blue ribbon.

=== 2005 ===
The winner was announced on 15 October 2005. Special commendations were awarded to Michael Molnar and Robin Kemball.

- Oliver Ready for The Prussian Bride, by Yuri Buida (Dedalus Books, 2002)
- Hugh Aplin for The Fatal Eggs, by Mikhail Bulgakov (Hesperus Press, 2003)
- Andrew Bromfield for The Naked Pioneer Girl, by Mikhail Kononov (Serpent's Tail, 2004)
- Robert Chandler, Elizabeth Chandler and Olga Meerson for Soul, by Andrei Platonov (Harvill Press, 2003)
- Arch Tait for Hurramabad, by Andrei Volos (Glas, 2001)
- Robert Maguire for Dead Souls, by Nikolai Gogol (Penguin Books, 2004)

=== 2007 ===
The winner was announced on 25 May 2007. A special commendation was awarded to Robert Chandler, in particular for his translation of The Railway by Hamid Ismailov and also for his lifetime oeuvre of translations.

- Joanne Turnbull for 7 Stories, by Sigismund Krzhizhanovsky (Glas, 2006)
- Anthony Briggs for War and Peace, by Leo Tolstoy (Penguin Books, 2005)
- Hugh Aplin for The Death of Ivan Ilyich, by Leo Tolstoy (Hesperus Press, 2005)
- Arch Tait for Sonechka: a novella and stories, by Ludmila Ulitskaya (Schocken Books, 2005)
- Anne O. Fisher for Ilf and Petrov's American Road Trip: The 1935 Travelogue for two Soviet writers by Ilya Ilf and Evgeny Petrov (Princeton Architectural Press & Cabinet Books, 2006)

=== 2009 ===
The winner was announced on 25 May 2009.

- Hugh Aplin for Romance with Cocaine, by Mikhail Ageyev (Hesperus Press, 2008)
- Ignat Avsey for Humiliated and Insulted, by Fyodor Dostoevsky (One World Classics, 2008)
- Nick Allen for One Soldier's War in Chechnya, by Andrei Babchenko (Portobello Books, 2007)
- Andrew Bromfield for The Sacred Book of the Werewolf, by Victor Pelevin (Faber and Faber, 2008)
- Sasha Dugdale for Birdsong on the Seabed, by Elena Shvarts (Bloodaxe Books, 2008)
- Jamey Gambrell for Ice, by Vladimir Sorokin (New York Review of Books, 2007)
- Amanda Love Darragh for Iramifications, by Maria Galina (Glas, 2008)

=== 2012 ===
The winner was announced on 23 May 2012. Also, a special commendation for the variety and quality of their translations was awarded to Hugh and Galya Aplin.

- Margaret Winchell for The Cathedral Clergy: A Chronicle, by Nikolay Leskov (Slavica, 2010)
- Konstantin Gurevich and Helen Anderson for The Golden Calf, by Ilya Ilf and Evgeny Petrov (Open Letter Books, 2009)
- John Elsworth for Petersburg, by Andrei Bely (Pushkin Press, 2009)
- Robert Chandler and Elizabeth Chandler for The Road, by Vasily Grossman (MacLehose Press, 2010)
- Galya Aplin and Hugh Aplin for The Village, by Ivan Bunin (Oneworld Classics, 2009)

=== 2014 ===
The shortlist was announced on 28 February 2014. The winner was announced on 21 March 2014.

- Andrew Bromfield for Happiness is Possible, by Oleg Zaionchkovsky (And Other Stories, 2012)
- Angela Livingstone for Phaedra; with New Year's Letter and Other Long Poems, by Marina Tsvetaeva (Angel Classics, 2013)
- Peter Daniels for Selected Poems, by Vladislav Khodasevich (Angel Classics, 2013)
- Robert Chandler and Elizabeth Chandler for Russian Magic Tales from Pushkin to Platonov, edited by Robert Chandler (Penguin Classics, 2012)
- Anthony Briggs for The Queen of Spades by Alexander Pushkin (Pushkin Press, 2012)
