= John Elsworth =

English academic and translator

John Elsworth is an English academic and translator, specialising in Russian literature. He studied Modern Languages at St John’s College, Cambridge, and also spent a year at Moscow University. He is Professor Emeritus of Russian Studies at the University of Manchester, where he taught from 1987 to 2004. He also taught at the University of East Anglia, the University of Virginia and the University of California, Berkeley.

Elsworth is a specialist on the life and works of Andrei Bely. He published a short biography of Bely in 1972 and a study of his seven novels in 1983. He won the 2012 Rossica Prize for his translation of Bely's best-known novel, Petersburg. He was previously nominated for translating The Silver Dove, Bely's debut novel. Elsworth has also served on the judging panel of the Rossica Prize.

He is married to Katya Young, and divides his time between Manchester and the Greek islands.
