= The Fiery Angel (opera) =

Opera by Sergei Prokofiev

- Opera by Sergei Prokofiev
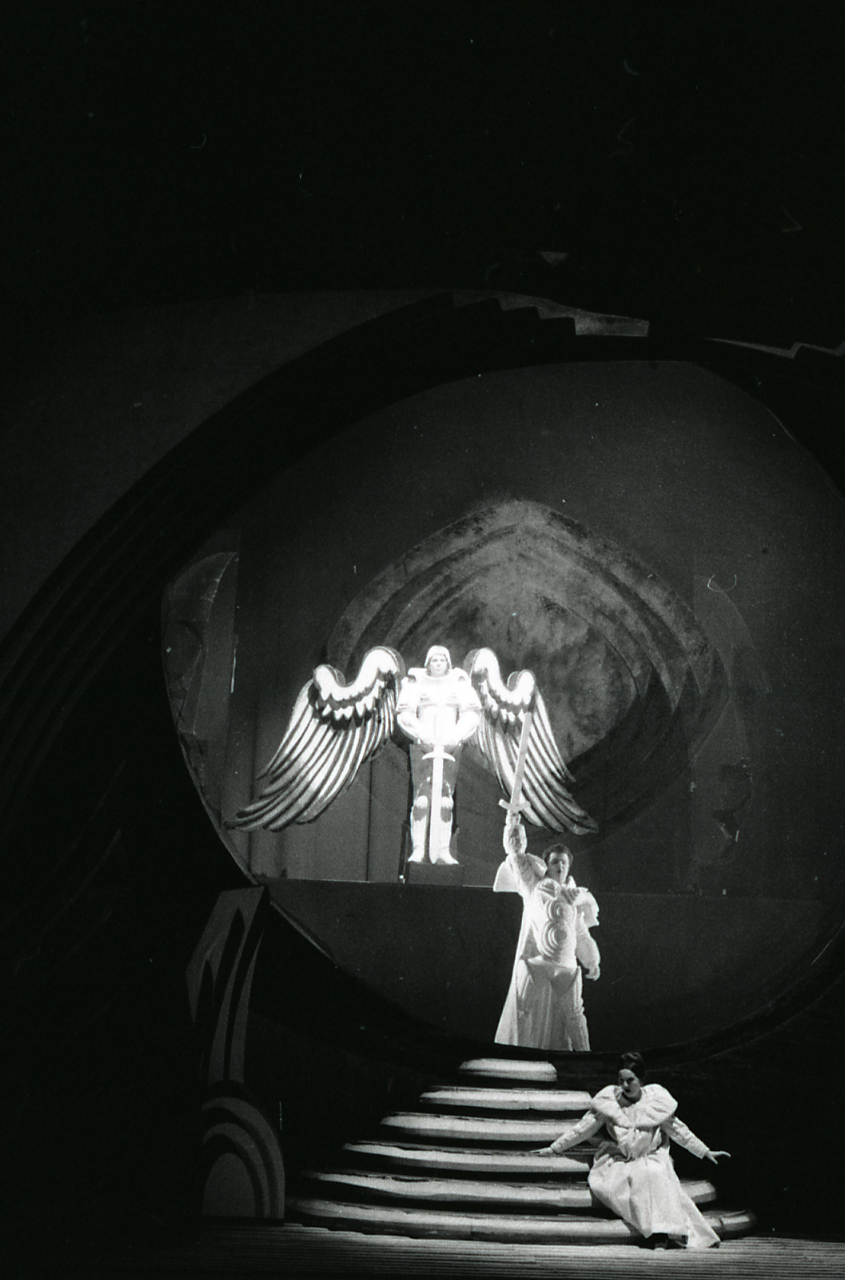
- Scene in a 1973 production, photographed by Paolo Monti
- Native title: Огненный ангел (Ognenny angel)
- Librettist: Prokofiev
- Language: Russian
- Based on: The Fiery Angel by Valery Bryusov
- Premiere: September 14, 1955; La Fenice, Venice

The Fiery Angel (Russian: Огненный ангел, romanized: Ognenny angel), Op. 37, is a five-act Russian-language opera by Sergei Prokofiev, who also wrote the libretto. It is based on Valery Bryusov's novel The Fiery Angel. The story follows Renata, a young woman obsessed with the angel Madiel and with Count Heinrich von Otterheim, whom she believes to be the angel in human form, and Ruprecht, a knight who becomes drawn into her search for Heinrich. Their pursuit leads through sorcery, violence and, ultimately, a convent where Renata is accused of demonic possession and condemned to death.

Prokofiev wrote the opera without a commission and worked on it for several years. An offer from Bruno Walter in 1926 to have the work produced in Berlin prompted Prokofiev to complete the orchestration in 1927, but the production did not take place. After hearing a concert performance of the second act conducted by Serge Koussevitzky in 1928, Prokofiev adapted material from the opera for his Symphony No. 3. The complete opera was first performed in concert in Paris on 25 November 1954, the year after Prokofiev's death, and received its first staged performance at La Fenice in Venice on 14 September 1955. Critical responses to the work have been mixed, with its score praised for its dramatic intensity but also criticized as confusing or noisy.

== Bryusov’s novel ==
Prokofiev's The Fiery Angel is based on a novel of the same name by Valery Bryusov. Prokofiev was more intrigued by the “orgies” (here, indulgence of passion) presented in the novel rather than the story ideas. The novel was inspired by Bryusov's own experiences with Nina Petrovskaya, and was considered one of the beginnings of the Russian Symbolist movement known as Vesy, or “The Scales”. Petrovskaya was the mistress of Andrey Bely. In their time together, Petrovskaya also came to know Bryusov in 1904, which sparked concerns for Bely. There was an anticipated brawl on a remote road in Moscow, but a mutual friend of Bryusov and Bely prevented the fight. Petrovskaya, Bely, and Bryusov inspired Prokofiev's characters in his opera, making the novel the prime source of inspiration for the work. The novel was also the basis for the libretto of Prokofiev's opera, which the composer himself wrote with the help of Demchinsky.

== Synopsis ==
The opera was originally composed of three acts and eleven scenes but was eventually reorganized into five acts and seven scenes.

=== Act 1 ===
Renata, a young woman searching for a missing love, resides at an inn. Ruprecht, a knight errant, meets Renata at the inn. She tells him that, since her childhood, she has been in love with an angel. This angel, Madiel, encouraged her to do good deeds, and at the age of seventeen she finally asked for his physical love. The angel, in response, glowed in fury, but agreed to return in human form. After Madiel's promise, Renata had met Count Heinrich von Otterheim. Convinced that this was her angel returned to Earth, Renata immediately gave herself to him. One year later, Otterheim left. In denial, Renata begs Ruprecht to help her search for Otterheim.

=== Act 2 ===
As the two search for Otterheim, Ruprecht soon falls in love with Renata, although she does not share the feeling. They decide to resort to sorcery to find Otterheim, and a spell is cast. Three knocks are then heard at the door. Renata assumes the spell has worked and nearly goes insane at the thought of Otterheim returning. But nobody is there. Ruprecht and Renata seek out the powerful sorcerer Agrippa von Nettesheim. Once in his lair, they are met with his refusal to help; his concerns lie with the power of the Inquisition.

=== Act 3 ===
Ruprecht learns that Renata has finally found Count Heinrich von Otterheim, who has rejected her. She begs to be avenged, learning that he was never her angel. Ruprecht attempts to exact revenge for Renata by dueling with Otterheim. However, right before the duel Renata has a change of heart. She makes Ruprecht promise her that he will not hurt Heinrich. Since the duel is one-sided, Otterheim easily overcomes Ruprecht and injures him.

=== Act 4 ===
Ruprecht and Renata have moved in together, but Renata now insists on joining a convent to better herself and for her soul's sake. There is a comic relief, involving Faust and Mephistopheles at a tavern. (This tavern scene, used to break up the dark sarcastic nature of the opera, is sometimes left out.)

=== Act 5 ===
Renata is in the convent, where the leaders accuse her of demonic possession. As an attempt to heal Renata ensues, all Hell essentially breaks loose (both on stage and in the orchestra) as the other nuns are also possessed. She is condemned by the Inquisitor to be burned at the stake.

== History ==
Written with no previous commissions or production being present, The Fiery Angel was begun at the only time in Prokofiev's life when religion played a role in his intellectual preoccupations. Its theme of obsession harkens back to Prokofiev's pre-Revolution operas (such as The Gambler), but with a portrayal of ambiguity that is completely new for the author. Most characters and emotions are associated with chromatic themes; the only tonal theme in the opera is associated with evil.

The opera as a whole is a contrast to some of Prokofiev's earlier operas (such as his opera The Love for Three Oranges) just by being a tragedy, and the story was considered very appropriate for Prokofiev's dark and sarcastic style.

Prokofiev faced several challenges during the production of the opera. There was a large amount of extra material in the work, there were what was considered violations of theater, negotiations with different theaters both in Europe and America continued to fail. In the midst of it all, Prokofiev felt he was unappreciated and unwanted, but his pride kept him striving for recognition.

In 1926, Bruno Walter made Prokofiev an offer to have The Fiery Angel produced at a Berlin theater, which prompted the composer to work on the orchestration. The orchestration was finished in 1927. The production was still unsuccessful. The opera and inspiration came and went, but it was the promises of production that kept Prokofiev writing.

Prokofiev, who had been working on the opera for years, was reluctant to let the music languish unperformed, and after hearing a concert performance of its second act given by Serge Koussevitzky in June 1928, he adapted parts of the opera to make his Symphony No. 3 in C minor, Op. 44, later that year.

The first concert performance of the work occurred in Paris on 25 November 1954, the year after Prokofiev's death. The first staged performance of the work, at La Fenice in Venice, followed on 14 September 1955.

== Reception ==
The Fiery Angel was met with mixed reviews for different reasons. Largely, The Fiery Angel was, despite lack of productions, reviewed as Prokofiev's “… strongest and most dramatically intense scores.” In a review of the Bolshoi performance of The Fiery Angel, it is said that Prokofiev's “…score is crazy, but shouldn’t sound chaotic.” Prokofiev may have only been interested in the overarching story rather than the smaller details. It was also criticized that maybe the language would have been better in French rather than Russian. Some even called the opera a “16th-century Carmen with supernatural trimmings” amongst other mixed reviews. Another criticism is that The Fiery Angel is nothing but confusion and noise with the “modern” title. Using staging should not be there to make up for the music, but to mix with it and make a grand production. Prokofiev was able to write the music how he saw fit, which appealed to many more than the staging has, according to different reviews.

== Recordings ==
- The first was recorded in 1957, conducted by Charles Bruck with the Orchestra of the Paris Opera. The opera was performed in French with Xavier Depraz and Jane Rhodes in the leading roles.
- The first Russian-language recording was released in 1990, conducted by Prokofiev specialist Neeme Järvi with the Gothenburg Symphony Orchestra, starring Nadine Secunde and Siegfried Lorenz as Renata and Ruprecht with Bryn Terfel, Heinz Zednik and Kurt Moll in supporting roles.
- Valery Gergiev, who has recorded a wide array of Russian operas with the Kirov Opera, released a recording taped from a series of performances at the Kirov opera, with Sergei Leiferkus and Galina Gorchakova as Ruprecht and Renata.

Source: Recordings of The Fiery Angel on operadis-opera-discography.org.uk
