= The Silver Dove =

1909 novel by Andrei Bely

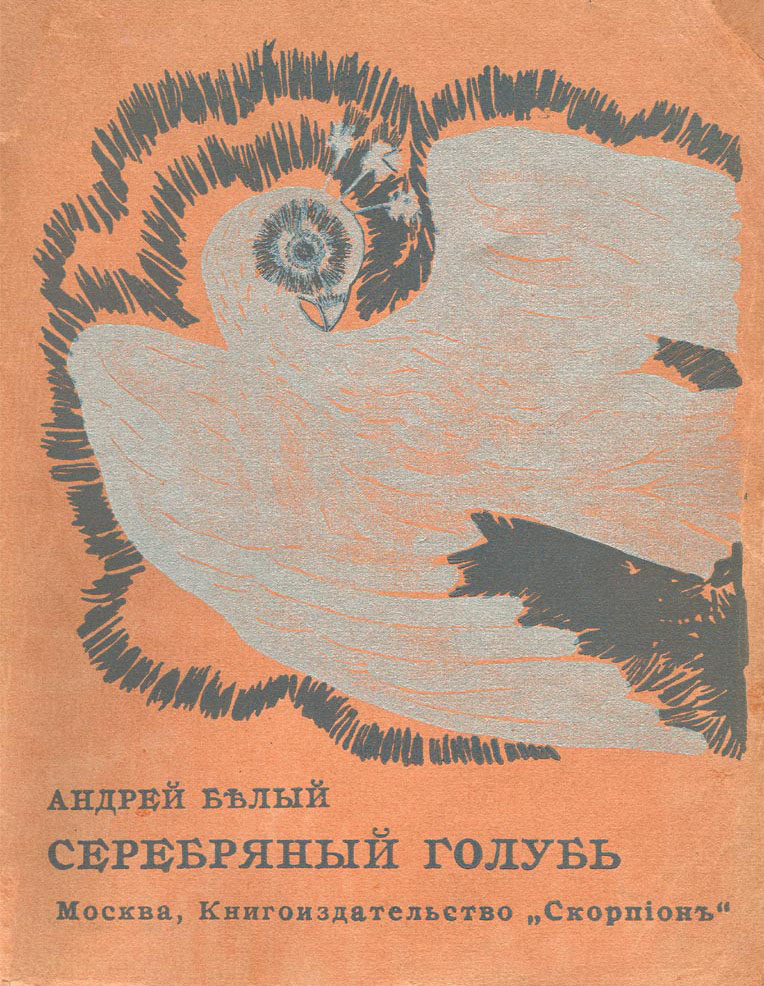
- First book edition (1910)
- Author: Andrei Bely
- Original title: Серебряный голубь
- Language: Russian
- Series: East or West
- Genre: Symbolist novel, modernist novel
- Publisher: Vesy
- Publication date: 1909
- Publication place: Russia
- Followed by: Petersburg

The Silver Dove is a novel by Andrei Bely published in 1909, in which he processes his partly neo-Kantian speculations, abstract thoughts and metaphysical speculations under the impression of the failed revolution of 1905. The work was planned as the first part of Bely's unfinished trilogy East or West, with Petersburg as the second installment.

== Background ==
Throughout his literary career, Bely was occupied with the conflict of "East and West", conflicts between the intelligentsia and the folk, as well as the struggle between the forces of light and dark. The novel was to be the first volume in a projected trilogy, East or West, Bely's first attempt to the conflicts. Virtually every crisis that preoccupied Bely's mind between 1906 and 1909 was reflected in the novel, from the failed revolution of 1905 to the debacle of his love affair with Alexander Blok's wife. Bely himself characterised his first novel as informed by a "sense of impending destruction".

Before The Silver Dove appeared as a separate book in 1910, it was serialized in Vesy in 1909. Its publication coincided with the appearance of Symbolism, a collection of essays, wherein Bely attempted to formulate his own and the Symbolist aesthetic credo.

Daryalsky and some other characters of the novel appear or are mentioned in Petersburg.

== Plot ==
The book is about a secret Russian folk sect called the Doves (similar to the Khlysts, popular in Russia in the 1900s). In the house of the carpenter Kudeyarov, they hold orgiastic religious gatherings in honor of the Mother of God Matryona, who is supposed to give birth to the new Savior, the Dove child. The protagonist, a young poet-philosopher, Pyotr Daryalsky, joins the cult and abandons Katya, the symbol of pure and idealized love, for Matryona, with whom he is chosen to create a Dove child. Kudeyarov discovers that the lovers' trysts involve more than merely coupling for the sake of a spiritual cause. He becomes jealous and plots to kill Daryalsky, while he learns that money, eroticism, murderous conspiracies and fake rituals are the driving powers in the sect. Before he is brutally murdered, Daryalsky believes that he is involved in a struggle with an occult force.

== Analysis ==
=== Reception ===
Nikolai Berdyaev saw the novel as an "amazing book", representing the return to the traditions of great Russian literature "on the basis of the achievements of the new art".

According to John Elsworth, "as an artistic monument to the second generation of Russian Symbolists The Silver Dove has no rivals".

The Silver Dove is somewhat less wildly original than his other works. It is closely modelled on the great example of Gogol. It cannot be called an imitative work, for it requires a powerful originality to learn from Gogol without failing piteously... The novel is written in splendid, sustainedly beautiful prose, and this prose is the first thing that strikes the reader in it. It is not so much Bely, however, as Gogol reflected in Bely, but it is always on Gogol's highest level, which is seldom the case with Gogol himself. The Silver Dove is somewhat alone also in being the one of Bely's novels which has most human interest in it, where the tragedy is in fectious and not merely puckishly ornamental... The novel contains much more narrative interest than most Russian novels do. It has a complicated and excellently disentangled plot. The characters are vivid like Gogol's, characterized largely by their physical features the dialogue, alive and expressive. But what is perhaps especially wonderful are the evocations of Nature, full of intense suggestiveness and pregnant poetry. The feeling of the monotonous and endless expanse of the Russian plain pervades the book. All this, together with the splendidly ornamental style, makes The Silver Dove one of the works of Russian literature that are most full of the most various riches.

— D. S. Mirsky

Despite longueurs and occasional lack of focus, The Silver Dove is a powerful and important book... Its stylistic richness is derived from Bely's virtuosity in switching from one narrative manner to another in accord with the social and educational level of the characters on whom the particular chapter is centered. Thus, the descriptions of village life are couched in a recognizable approximation of the voice of Gogol's fictitious narrator in his early stories. The evocation of Gogol's manner... is not a case of simple imitation, but rather a response to the urge common to writers of Bely's generation, to demonstrate that their great 19th‐century predecessors were imaginative literary artists and brilliant stylists rather than merely topical social critics, as the earlier tradition.

— Simon Karlinsky, The New York Times, 1974

=== Style ===
The novel is unique for multi-faceted narrative structure, which relies on skaz thechniques, Bely's ornamental style (according to Mirsky, ornamental prose is a term, opposite to Tolstoy's or Stendhal's analytical prose, prose which "keeps the reader's attention to every small detail"; the famous ornamentalists are Gogol, Rabelais, and James Joyce), rhetorical flourishes, digressions, and musical leitmotifs give the novel its richly varied texture. Within the confines of this structure appear a series of mocking antitheses, for the novel cannot escape its ironic stance. As Olga Cooke writes, Bely "captures a haunting, mesmerizing sense of apocalyptic doom".

Like in Petersburg and unlike his after-1917 novels, which differ with multi-faceted complex people, characters of The Silver Dove are not full-blooded figures in the Tolstoian sense; they are caught between reality and dreamscapes, rarely in control of their destiny.

One of the remarkable formal experiments of the novel is Bely's rhythmic prose, which was quite unusual at the time of publication and took some getting used to at first. The immediate beginning of the novel, for example, has a dactyl almost throughout.

In terms of content, the work reflects the atmosphere of the fin de siècle and decadence through the generated mood of unreasonable fear and the description of orgiastic excesses, which, especially in pre-revolutionary Russia, herald the imminent demise of the old order.

=== Themes ===
Among the themes of the novel are the fate of Russia, the role of consciousness, mystical anarchism, the dangers of uniting with the people in the hopes of creating a utopia, and relations between the folk (narod) and intelligentsia. Daryalsky rejects the decadent and rational west in favour of merging with narod (the peasant sectarians). The novel suggests an atavistic return of long-buried forces that are mistakenly interpreted as spiritual in nature, but are materialistic in actuality.

Daryalsky's personal cataclysm mirrors the doom of Russia: while in the foreground we witness the destruction of the hero, there are background social unrest and nation-wide upheavals, labour strikes, peasant revolts and secret police activities in the background. Virtually every class is represented, from peasants and carpenters, to merchants and the clergy, to aristocrats and the landed gentry.

The central theme of the novel is the division between the rational West and Eastern chaos and brute occult forces. It is represented not only stylistically and socially but also geographically. Gugolevo village, site of the West, provides the backdrop for decayed estates and baronial traditions reflected in The Cherry Orchard. Its diametrical opposite is Likhov town, the headquarters of the Doves and the place of Daryalsky's death. The centre of this world is Tselebeevo, standing for wholeness. Indeed, the geography of the novel resembles a map of Daryalsky's mind, described in a freer language and unencumbered by logic.

In his thought, Bely strives for synthesis, cohesion, and integration. In this way, Daryalsky represents a perfect embodiment of this deep-seated life-long striving, whether it is a marriage of flesh and spirit or of the intelligentsia and the folk. At the same time, Bely reveals that spiritual regeneration is impossible.

In so far as one can discern aspects of Belyi in the depiction of Daryalsky, Maria Carlson has observed that The Silver Dove represents a programmatic illustration of three fundamental concepts developed by Bely, namely, theurgy, "the creation of life", and "experience".

== Translations ==
- The Silver Dove, translated by George Reavey, Grove Press (1974)
- The Silver Dove, translated by John Elsworth, Northwestern University Press (2000)
