= Rossica Young Translators Prize =

- Location: London, during the London Book Fair
- Eligibility: Translators under 25 years of age
- Reward: Cash prize
- Established: 2009

The Rossica Young Translators Prize is an annual award given to an exceptional translation of a passage of contemporary Russian literature from Russian into English. It was inaugurated in 2009 by Academia Rossica, a cultural organisation set up to promote and strengthen cultural and intellectual ties between Russia and the English-speaking world. The distinction comes with a cash prize. The prize is awarded in London during the London Book Fair. Anyone under 25 years is eligible for the Rossica Young Translators Prize. Entrants translate one of three extracts (of around three thousand words each) from contemporary Russian novels, as yet untranslated into English. Academia Rossica also awards the biennial Rossica Translation Prize for already published translations in book length.

== Winners ==
Year	Translator	Translation	Author
2009	James Rann	The List (Extract)	Dmitrii Bykov
2010	Leo Shtutin	Letter-Book (Extract)	Mikhail Shishkin
2011	Maya Vinokour	The Living (Extract)	Anna Starobinets
2012	Gregory Afinogenov	S.N.U.F.F. (Extract)	Victor Pelevin
2013	Pola Lem	The Women of Lazarus (Extract)	Marina Stepnova
2014	Laura Thomas	1993 (Extract)	Sergei Shargunov

== See also ==
- List of literary awards
- List of years in literature
