= Petersburg (novel) =

1913/1922 novel by Andrei Bely

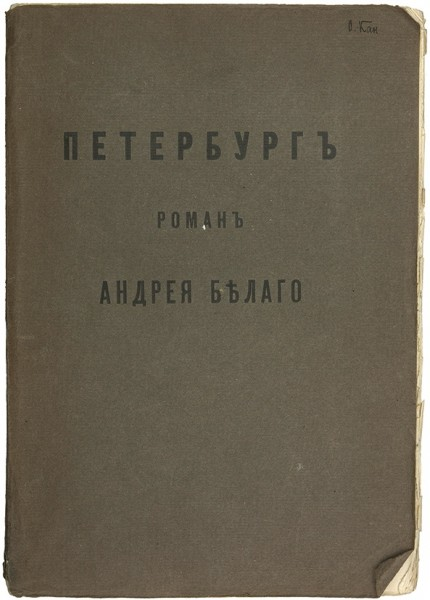
- Cover of 1916 edition
- Author: Andrei Bely
- Original title: Петербургъ
- Translator: John Cournos; John E. Malmstad; Robert A. Maguire; David McDuff; John Elsworth
- Language: Russian
- Series: East or West
- Genre: Symbolist novel; modernist novel; philosophical novel; political novel
- Publication date: 1913 and 1922
- Publication place: Russia and Germany
- Preceded by: The Silver Dove
- Followed by: Moscow Duology

Petersburg (Russian: Петербург, romanized: Peterburg; pre-reform spelling: Петербургъ) is a novel by Russian writer Andrei Bely. A Symbolist work, it has been compared to other "city novels" like Ulysses and Berlin Alexanderplatz. The first edition was completed in November 1913 and published serially from October 1913 to March 1914 (and later reissued as a book in 1916). It received little attention and was not translated into English until 1959 by John Cournos (revised version) and David McDuff in 1995 (first version), over 37 years after the shortened and revised version and 82 years after the first version was published respectively.

Today the book is generally considered Bely's masterpiece; Vladimir Nabokov ranked it one of the four greatest "masterpieces of twentieth-century prose", after Ulysses and The Metamorphosis, and before "the first half" of In Search of Lost Time.

In 1922, Bely published in Berlin a revised edition which was shorter by a third than the first one. As Bely noted, "the new edition is a completely new book for the readers of the first edition". In the Berlin version Bely changed the foot of his rhythmic prose from anapest to amphibrach, and removed ironical passages related to the revolutionary movement. The second version is usually considered as inferior to the first one.

The novel is the second part of Bely's unfinished trilogy East or West, while The Silver Dove is the first one.

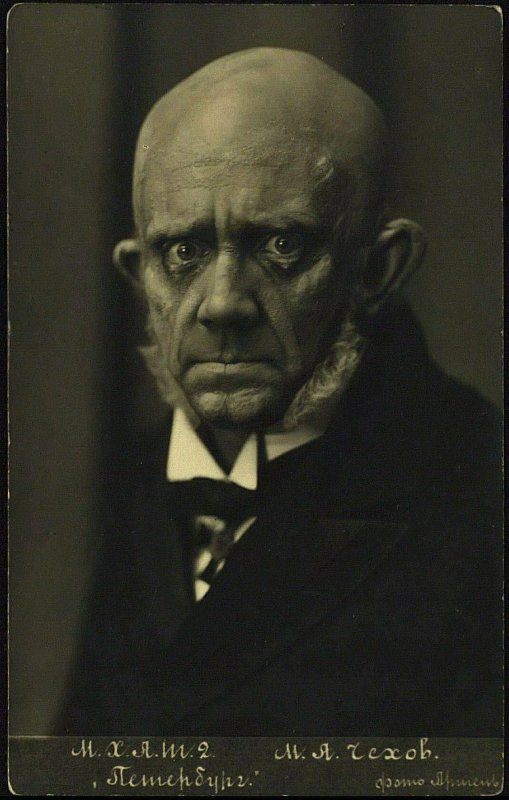
Mikhail Chekhov as Apollon Apollonovich Ableukhov (Second Moscow Art Theatre production of the novel, 1925)

== Plot summary ==
Just after the conclusion of the Russo-Japanese War in 1905, Nikolai Apollonovich Ableukhov is given the task of assassinating his bureaucrat father, Apollon Apollonovich, using a time bomb supplied to him by a fellow radical, Alexander Ivanovich Dudkin. Nikolai Apollonovich spends much of his time dressing himself in a red domino costume with a black domino mask, making a fool of himself in front of Sofya Petrovna Likhutina, a woman who has rebuked his flirtations in the past. Instead of focusing on the immense task he has agreed to undertake he gets himself into the newspaper's gossip columns with his antics and attends a party. His father notices these exploits and decides that his son is a scoundrel. Dudkin himself answers to a man named Lippanchenko, the leader of their radical group. Eventually both Nikolai Apollonovich and Dudkin experience a change of heart about their mission, however there is much to detain Nikolai Apollonovich on his way to throw the bomb into the river.

== Characters ==
- Apollon Apollonovich Ableukhov – a senior official in the Russian Imperial government. Aged and traditionalist, Apollon rebukes revolutionary ideals in favour of Imperialist tradition
- Nikolai Apollonovich Ableukhov (Nikolenka/Kolenka) – Apollon Apollonovich's son; a student involved in radical politics who erroneously agrees to assassinate his father and later attempts to stop this from happening
- Anna Petrovna Ableukhova – Apollon Apollonovich's estranged wife and Nikolai's mother; lives in Spain with an Italian artist having left Apollon two and half years prior to the events of the story
- Sofya Petrovna Likhutina (Angel Peri) – a socialite who runs an informal salon from her apartment and involves herself in revolutionary politics
- Mavrushka – Sofya Petrovna's maid
- Sergei Sergeyevich Likhutin (Seryozhka) – a second lieutenant in the Gregorian Regiment; Sofya's husband; Nikolai Apollonovich's childhood friend
- Nikolai Stepanovich Lippanchenko (Lipensky) – attends Sofya Petrovna's salon; a provocator and leader of the radical terrorist wing of the party; based on Yevno Azef
- Varvara Yevgrafovna Solovyova – an intellectual well versed in Marxist theory; friends with Sofya Petrovna; involved with the party
- Nikolai Petrovich Tsukatov (Coco) – a wealthy man who hosts a ball attended by many of the main characters
- Lyubov' Alekseyevna Tsukatova – Nikolai Petrovich's wife
- Leib Hussar Shporyshev – attends Sofya Petrovna's salon
- Baron Ommau-Ommergau – a "yellow cuirassier"; attends Sofya Petrovna's salon
- Count Aven – a "blue cuirassier"; attends Sofya Petrovna's salon
- Herman Hermanovich Verhefden – a clerk in Apollon Apollonovich's office; attends Sofya Petrovna's salon
- Aleksandr Ivanovich Dudkin – a former political prisoner and local party operative reporting to Lippanchenko who suffers from fits of delirium
- Zoya Zakharovna Fleisch – Lippanchenko's elderly mother who lives with him
- Pavel Yakovlevich Morkovin or Voronkov – possibly a secret policeman; possibly also a party member
- Mindalini (Mantalini) – Anna Petrovna's Italian lover
- Matvei Morzhov – a yardkeeper
- Dmitrich Semyonych – the Ableukhovs' senile doorkeeper
- Ivan Ivanych Ivanov – a merchant
- Bessmertny – a shoe salesman
- Neintelpfain – a hack journalist
- Stepan Styopka – a Christian friend of Dudkin's
- Grishka – a lackey in the Ableukhov household

== Structure ==
Bely drew many of his characters from historical models: Apollon Apollonovich shares many characteristics with Procurator of the Holy Synod Konstantin Pobedonostsev; Dudkin resembles the revolutionary terrorist Boris Savinkov; Lippanchenko shares many characteristics with the infamous double agent Yevno Azef.

There are similarities with James Joyce's Ulysses. The linguistic rhythms, wordplay, symbolism, politics, and general structure and themes of the novel have all been compared to Joyce's novel, as well as the setting of the action in a capital city (Dublin; St. Petersburg) that is itself a character and the unusual use of humor. However, the differences are also notable; the English translation of Bely remains more accessible than Joyce, for example. Bely's work is based on a complex rhythm of patterns, yet does not use such a wide variety of innovations as Joyce.

The comparison of Petersburg to Ulysses has been made for both its symbolist style and for the centrality of the city within the narrative. There are many allusions within the novel to the city's history going back to its founding by Peter the Great, and it incorporates a number of literary allusions to literature set in Petersburg (especially The Bronze Horseman) as well as Russian literature in general. The characters such as Apollon Apollonovich and Alexander Ivanovich often merge with their environments, while the city itself forms a significant role in the story's unfolding.

The book was informed by many of the philosophies Bely and others of his time were concerned with, both political and spiritual. One of the major influences on the somewhat mystical tone of the book was Bely's experience with Rudolf Steiner and his philosophy of anthroposophy. The characters undergo various transcendent states, and these are generally drawn from Bely's spiritual studies. There are also discussions of Marxism and Friedrich Nietzsche's ideas, and, though the book revolves around a political action, much of it is concerned with spiritual states.

== Translations ==
There have been four major translations of the novel into English:

=== 1922 version ===
1. St. Petersburg (or Saint Petersburg), translated by John Cournos (1959, based on the Berlin version)
2. Petersburg, translated and annotated by John E. Malmstad and Robert Alan Maguire (Indiana University Press, 1978; based on the Berlin version) ISBN 0-253-20219-1

=== 1913 version ===
1. Petersburg, translated by David McDuff (Penguin Books, 1995)
2. Petersburg, translated by John Elsworth (Pushkin Press, 2009); winner of the 2012 Rossica Translation Prize

=== Comparisons ===
In a review of all the existing English translations, Michael R. Katz writes that "if someone wants to read Bely's masterpiece and to understand most of it, then learn Russian and read it in the original; if he/she wants to understand some of it, then read Maguire and Malmstad's magisterial annotated, introduced, and reasonably well-translated scholarly edition; and if someone wants just to say that he/she has read Bely's Petersburg for the sake of adding one notch to his cultural gun [then] go read Elsworth's version." In the Times Literary Supplement, Thomas Karshan noted that "Elsworth's version conveys little of Bely's sonic patterning" but that "McDuff's distinguished 1995 version does a good job of approximating the music of Bely's Symbolist prose poetry".
