= Oliver Ready =

British Slavist, Russian-English translator

Oliver James Ready
- Born: 17 April 1976 (age 50); Pembury, Kent
- Citizenship: United Kingdom
- Education: University of Oxford

Oliver James Ready (born 17 April 1976) is a British Slavist and Russian-English translator.

== Biography ==
In 1994–1998, he studied Modern Languages (Russian and Italian) at Worcester College, Oxford. In 2000–2001, he did MA in Russian Studies at SSEES, University College London. In 2007, he completed his DPhil at Wolfson College, Oxford.

In 2008–2017, he was consultant editor for Russian and East-Central Europe at The Times Literary Supplement.

Since 2010, he has been a research fellow at St Antony's College, Oxford. In 2011–2014, he was director of the Russkiy Mir Program.

Since 2014, he has been working as a teacher of Russian literature at the University of Oxford.

== Literary translation ==
Oliver Ready came to the attention of the general public in 2014 when his translation of Fyodor Dostoevsky's novel Crime and Punishment was published. In a book review with the telling title "This new translation of Crime and Punishment is a masterpiece", the writer and critic A. N. Wilson writes: "Sometimes, though, a new translation really makes us see a favourite masterpiece afresh", which is followed by claims that Ready's translation is better than the classic translations of Constance Garnett and David Magarshack.

== Bibliography ==
=== Author ===
- Persisting in Folly: Russian Writers in Search of Wisdom, 1963–2013 (Peter Lang: Oxford, 2017) (Russian Transformations: Literature, Culture and Ideas). ISBN 978-1-78707-401-9.

=== Translator ===
- Yury Buida: The Zero Train = Дон Домино (London: Dedalus, 2001; ISBN 978-1-903517-01-7)
- Yury Buida: The Prussian Bride = Прусская невеста (London: Dedalus, 2002; ISBN 978-1-903517-06-2)
- Fyodor Dostoyevsky. Crime and Punishment = Преступление и наказание (London: Penguin Books, 2014; ISBN 978-0-14-119280-2)
- Vladimir Sharov. Before and During = До и во время (London: Dedalus, 2014; ISBN 978-1-9076-5071-0)
- Ivan Maisky: The Maisky Diaries: The Wartime Revelations of Stalin's Ambassador in London = Дневник дипломата (Лондон, 1934–1943) (edited by Gabriel Gorodetsky, translated by Oliver Ready and Tatiana Sorokina. — London: London Yale University Press, 2016; ISBN 978-0-300-22170-1)
- Vladimir Sharov: The Rehearsals = Репетиции (London: Dedalus, 2018; ISBN 978-1910213148)
- Nikolai Gogol: And the Earth Will Sit on the Moon = Рассказы (London: Pushkin Press, 2019; ISBN 9781782275152)
- Vladimir Sharov: Be as Children = Будьте как дети (London: Dedalus, 2021)

== Acclaim ==
- 2005 — Rossica Translation Prize for translation of the short-story cycle The Prussian bride (author Yuri Buida) into English.
- 2015 — Read Russia English Translation Prize for translation of the novel Before and during (author Vladimir Sharov) into English.
- 2016 — shortlist of the PEN Translation Prize for translation of the novel Crime and Punishment (author Fyodor Dostoevsky) into English.
- 2018 — Read Russia Prize for translation of the novel Rehearsals (author Vladimir Sharov) into English.
