= The Big Green Tent =

Novel by Lyudmila Ultiskaya

First edition (publ. Eksmo)

The Big Green Tent (Russian: Зелёный шатёр) is a novel by Russian novelist and short story writer Lyudmila Ulitskaya. It was published in Russian in 2010 and was translated into English by Polly Gannon in 2015.

== Historical context ==
The Big Green Tent takes place in the Soviet Union, Russia's political state for 11 years after the death of Joseph Stalin. During this time, the government became involved in every aspect of the Russian citizens’ daily lives through propaganda and censorship which is reflected in the novel. Although not explicitly referred to in the book, the Soviet officials kickstarted a campaign to convince children that they were in fact living happy lives during the political turmoil. They were not only the target for this effort, but also the representation on posters. It was not meant to be viewed as adults telling children how to live, rather it was children telling their peers how good life in Russia was. The point of this was to create a sense of unity with one another in order to keep the Soviet ideals in line and not have those who diverged and spoke against the strict guidelines. Despite the effort demonstrated by the government, their work was not as fruitful as they had hoped.

The book shows the main characters dissenting from this through their production of samizdat which leads to the discussion on censorship. During the era of Soviet Union, news, art, and literature were heavily censored in an effort to keep the adults from reading about new ideas from other countries and Russia's own citizens. Publishing works like the samizdat in the book were punishable by imprisonment which is what happened to Mikha.

== Plot summary ==
The novel recounts the lives of three boys: Ilya, Sanya, and Mikha. Attending the same school and struggling against the local bullies leads them all to become friends early on in childhood. Through their literature teacher, Victor Shengeli, the boys find a passion for reading and poetry. Shengeli becomes close friends with his students and spends Wednesday evenings touring Moscow as their guide calling themselves the LORLs, or the Lovers of Russian Literature. The boys grow up together experiencing a lot of the same joys and struggles, and remain close through their high school graduation. When the time comes for college applications, careers, and new beginnings, Ilya plans to attend the Leningrad Institute of Cinema Engineering to pursue his passion for photography. However, he meets Pierre Zand, a Belgian visiting Moscow for an international student festival, whom he befriends. Eventually, the two agree to produce samizdat for a foreign publication. Ilya collects the photographs and literary works, then sends them to Pierre to be published internationally. This work extends for the entirety of Ilya's life. He has his only son with his first wife Lyudmila. Disturbed by the potential miserable life her autistic son will experience, Lyudmila moves to America with her son leaving Ilya behind in Russia. As his relationship deteriorates with Lyudmila, he falls in love with a woman named Olga whom he marries and lives with for many years helping to raise her son Kostya. His dangerous career of producing samizdat forces Ilya to flee Russia. He remains in touch with Olga who desperately seeks to be with him again, but again, Ilya has moved on to love another woman. He eventually ends up living in Munich, where he later dies of kidney cancer. Olga dies forty days later after her recovery from a severe depression caused by Ilya's leaving. While Ilya pursues his career, Mikha finds a passion for philology and defectology and seeks to combine the two through teaching deaf-mute children. His mentor, Yakov Petrovich, provides him with knowledge concerning defectology and eventually gets him a job teaching in a rural deaf-mute school. Mikha marries Alyona around the same time his Aunt Genya passes away. He eventually loses his teaching job because of his entanglement with samizdat and anti-Soviet behavior. Having no other options, Mikha begins to work with Ilya creating and distributing samizdat for international publication. This work eventually leads him to imprisonment and when he is freed, nothing is the same. His marriage and social life fall apart, leading him to commit suicide. As for Sanya, he chooses to pursue his interest in music theory and composition. His studies lead him to become cut off from the sociopolitical world until Mikha is arrested. Sanya is driven to take Mikha's place in caring for Alyona, and even helps her raise Mikha's newborn son, Maya. When Mikha comes home, Sanya is awkwardly distanced from his friends at the same time that his grandmother, Anna Alexandrovna, dies. Sanya, feeling empty and wanting to leave Russia, allows Pierre to set him up with an American woman. His new wife gives him the opportunity to immigrate to America where he goes on to teach at a world renowned music school. The novel ends with a reunion of Sanya and a childhood friend named Liza. Later on the night of their meeting, the poet Joseph Brodsky, whom they visited earlier that evening, and who had been exiled to the US, dies.

== Main characters ==
- Ilya –– the first of the protagonists; he has a passion for photography and literature that directs the course of his life and his career as a samizdat publisher (Married to Lyudmila with whom he has an autistic son, then marries Olga).
- Mikha –– the second of the protagonists; he has a passion for literature and teaching disabled children. He undergoes many hardships which cost him his teaching job, put him in jail, and ultimately lead to his suicide.
- Sanya –– the third and final protagonist; he has a passion for music that starts at an early age. His grandmother, Anna Alexandrovna, nurtures this passion which leads him through his social life and his career. He escapes Russia through immigration to America and goes on to teach at a famous music school.
- Victor Yulievich –– Ilya, Sanya, and Mikha's literature teacher; he changes the boy's perspectives on life and opens them up to literature. He remains friends with the boys throughout their lives and acts as a distant mentor until his death.
- Pierre Zand –– Russian emigrant who lives in Belgium. He becomes friends with the three protagonists, most notably Ilya. He lives outside of Russia and works with Ilya to produce samizdat in foreign countries.
- Anna Alexandrovna –– Sanya's grandmother; she not only helps raise Sanya, but she also finds a friendship with Mikha that lasts until her death following Mikha's return from prison.
- Olga –– Ilya's second wife after her own first marriage ends. Besides her son, Kostya, her life revolves around Ilya, even up unto the point of her death.
- Kostya –– the son of Olga and Vova, Olga's first husband; he is mostly raised by Ilya whom he takes after both socially and politically.
- Tamara Brin “Brinchik” –– the first of Olga's best friends from childhood; she cares for Olga throughout her life, especially after Ilya leaves Olga. Ultimately, her own husband is forced to leave the country, leaving her alone in Russia.
- Galya –– the second of Olga's best friends; she supports Olga alongside Tamara despite their distaste for one another. After Olga dies, Tamara and Galya settle differences and become friends.
- Afanasy Mikhailovich –– a retired war veteran; he is the husband of Antonina Naumovna and the father of Olga. He opens his home for Ilya and Olga when they marry. During retirement, he pursues his love for refurbishing furniture until his death.
- Antonina Naumovna –– a renowned magazine editor; she is the wife of Afansay Mikhailovich and the mother of Olga. She resents Olga for her choices later in life and dies not long after her husband.
- Alyona –– wife of Mikha; she has a son with him named Maya. As her husband begins to undergo seemingly endless hardships, she falls distant from him. She leaves, taking Maya to stay with her parents. She remains there even after Mikha's suicide.

== Major themes and symbols ==
- Anti-Sovietism –– the novel explores resistance to the Soviet government through the careers and beliefs of the three main characters and their friends. Ilya and Mikhail take a huge interest in samizdat production during their young adult lives which ends up being their final careers. They were obviously aware of the consequences considering raids happened frequently and they both encountered close calls with the government. They were both raised in the era that attempted to brain wash them into following Soviet rules, but their resilience and passion for uncovering new ways to see the world was more important than following laws. Without the fight made with samizdat and anti-Soviet practices, there would be no book.
- Loyalty –– the friendships found within the novel all rely on trusting one another and standing by loved ones no matter their burdens. While they were still young, the boys demonstrated their loyalty by standing by Professor Yulievich during his trial against the other teachers. They knew he had done nothing wrong and stood up for him even though it was inconvenient for them. Together they helped friends in need, but they always took care of one another, too. For instance, Mikha was in need of a job, so Ilya found him a spot working with the team producing samizdat. Though it led him to prison, Mikha had a friend through everything. In addition to Ilya's assistance with attaining work, Sanya stepped in to care for Mikha's wife when he was imprisoned. Sacrificing for one another in order to stabilize their lives was important to the boys.
- Emigration –– there is a constant sense of needing to escape their homes and many of the characters threaten to leave, unfortunately, the majority never have that opportunity. Though this theme seems a little obscure, it makes sense when compared to the time period. During this era, the citizens of Russia were not happy despite being told they were by the government, so the fact that the characters in The Big Green Tent often wished to flee their home country is not surprising. Ilya leaves on many occasions, while Sanya emigrates permanently to the United States at the end of the books. Consistently, people leave for long periods of times and return unhappy. Though traveling to a different city for a few days is not as drastic as leaving once and for all, it symbolizes, on a smaller scale, the desire for something more.
- Milyutin Park –– this park in the novel becomes a rendezvous point for the friends to meet up throughout the years. If nothing else is consistent in their lives, this is one place they could always count on.
- The Big Green Tent –– at the end of the eighth chapter, the Big Green Tent is seen as a vision before Olga dies. Every character, past and present, is seen at the tent and it could be defined as prophetic.

== See also ==
- Lyudmila Ulitskaya
- Post-Soviet Russian Literature
