= Vladimir Sharov =

Russian novelist (1952–2018)

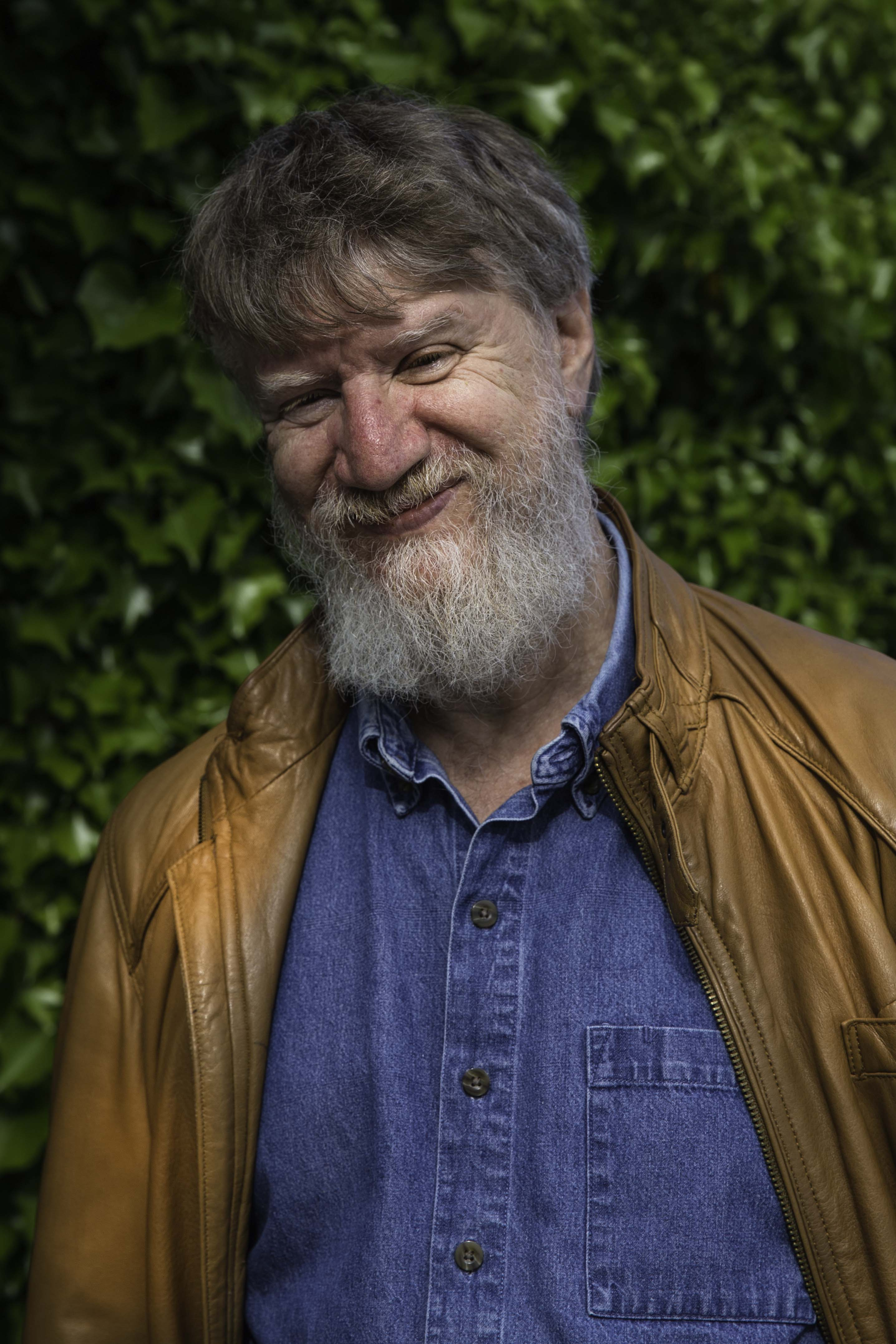
- Sharov in Lavigny, 2016
- Born: April 7, 1952; Moscow, Russian SFSR, Soviet Union
- Died: 17 August 2018 (aged 66); Moscow, Russia
- Writing career
- Genres: Fiction, non-fiction
- Notable works: Before and During; The Rehearsals

Vladimir Alexandrovich Sharov (Russian: Владимир Александрович Шаров, April 7, 1952 – August 17, 2018) was a Russian novelist who was awarded the Russian Booker Prize in 2014 for his novel Return to Egypt (Возвращение в Египет).

== Biography ==
Vladimir Sharov was born in April, 1952 in Moscow, Russia. His father, Alexander Sharov (Shera Nurenberg), was a well-known Soviet children's writer. Sharov grew up in Moscow where he attended secondary school at the State Physics and Mathematics Lyceum of Moscow. He studied history at the Voronezh State University. In 1984, Sharov defended his thesis on the historiography of the Time of Troubles and Ivan the Terrible's secret police, the Oprichnina. Sharov lived in Moscow. He gave guest lectures on Russian history, literature and culture at international universities such as Harvard, Lexington VA, Cologne, Rome, Zurich as well as Oxford and Cambridge. He was a member of PEN International.

== Reception ==
Sharov's novels were met with controversy in the Russian literary world, especially the publication of Before and During, some critics rejected the philosophy and poetics of Sharov's prose, but all his novels were celebrated in Russia and received several Russian literary awards, including the Russian Booker Prize 2014 for Return to Egypt.

Sharov's works have been translated into several languages including Italian, French and English. The English translations of his novels were highly praised by critics. Anna Aslanyan for The Independent noted: "if Russian history is indeed a commentary to the Bible, then Before and During is an audacious attempt to shine a mystical light on it, an unusual take on the twentieth century’s apocalypse that leaves the reader to look for their own explications." Caryl Emerson wrote that in Sharov's novels "historical reality, in all its irreversible awfulness, is for a moment scrambled, eroticized, permitted impossible juxtapositions and illuminated by hilarious monologues of the dead". His characters "do not make eye contact, but rather talk into the cosmic void". Rachel Polonsky for The New York Review of Books stated that "the clarity and directness of Sharov's prose – wonderfully rendered by Oliver Ready – are disconcerting, almost hallucinatory. His writing is at times funny, at times so piercingly moving, so brimful of unassuaged sorrow, that it causes a double-take. 'How did I get here?' is a question his reader will likely ask again and again."

The Los Angeles Review of Books praised the work of the translator: "Oliver Ready hears and renders into English many stylistic registers, reminding us that Sharov began creative life as a poet. If it is true ― and I believe it is ― that translation requires the most intimate dialogue possible with another’s consciousness, then Sharov’s rebirth into English in such staggeringly fine prose is the perfect tribute to commemorate the departure of his mortal body."

== Selected bibliography ==
=== Novels ===
- Cлед в след (1991). A Trace in the Footprint
- Репетиции (1992). The Rehearsals, trans. Oliver Ready (Dedalus, 2018; ISBN 978-1910213148)
- До и во время (1993). Before and During, trans. Oliver Ready (Dedalus, 2015; ISBN 978-1907650710)
- Мне ли не пожалеть (1995). Do I Have No Regrets
- Старая девочка (1998). The Old Girl
- Воскрешение Лазаря (2002). Raising Lazarus
- Будьте как дети (2008). Be as Children, trans. Oliver Ready (Dedalus, 2021)
- Возвращение в Египет (2013). Return to Egypt
- Царство Агамемнона (2018). The Kingdom of Agamemnon, trans. Oliver Ready (New York Review Books, forthcoming)

=== Non-fiction ===
- Перекрестное опыление (2019). Сross-pollination

== Awards ==
- Russian Booker Prize (2014, Russia) for the novel Return to Egypt
- National Literary Award Big Book, 3rd Prize (2014, Russia) for the novel Return to Egypt
