= Dokhturov =

Dokhturov is a Russian surname. People with this surname include:

- Dmitry Dokhturov
- Dmitry Petrovich Dokhturov

== See also ==
- Doctorow, a Russian-Jewish surname
