= Academia Rossica =

UK nonprofit organization

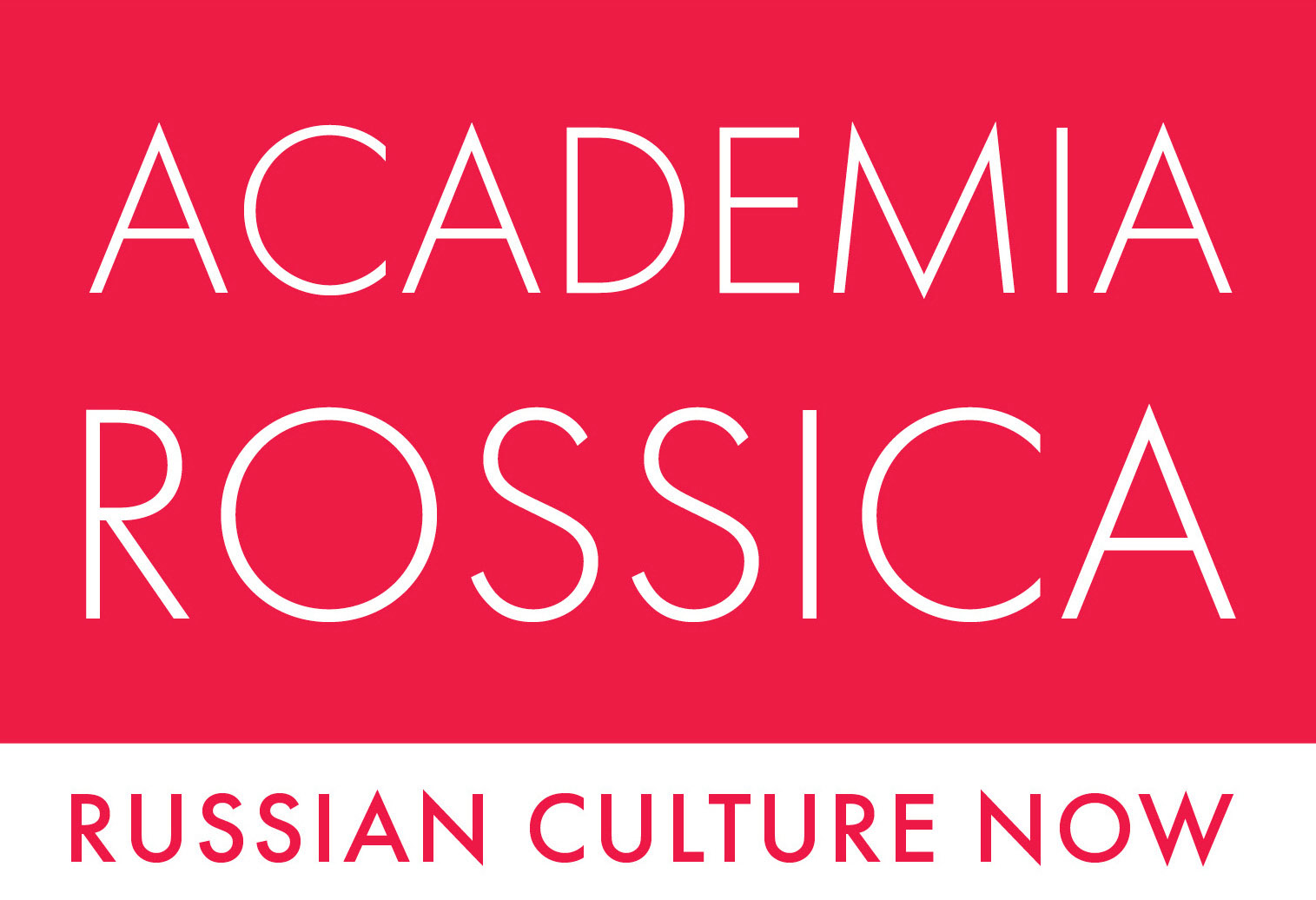
- Established: 2000
- Location: Brewer Street, London W1F 9TX, England, United Kingdom
- Director: Svetlana Adjoubei
- Public transit access: Piccadilly Circus
- Website: Academia-rossica.org

Academia Rossica (London/Moscow) is a cultural organisation set up in 2000 to promote and strengthen cultural and intellectual ties between Russia and the West, pioneering intercultural projects and bringing the best of contemporary Russian culture to the West. With offices in London and Moscow, Academia Rossica acts as a bridge between these two thriving cultural capitals. Academia Rossica is a non-profit organization, and a UK registered charity.

== About ==
Academia Rossica runs a programme of cultural events, including the London Russian Film Festival and aims to provide a platform for intellectual exchange between Russia and the UK through the Russian Publishers stand at the London Book Fair. Academia Rossica invites contemporary Russian writers and critics for a programme of seminars and discussions during the SLOVO Festival. There are also two literary translation awards presented by Academia Rossica: The Rossica Prize, for the best literary translation from Russian into English, and the Rossica Young Translators Prize, for anyone under 25.

== Film ==
London Russian Film Festival

The London Russian Film Festival is an annual film festival held in the United Kingdom, showcasing new and award-winning Russian films. Held annually since 2007, it features documentaries, animations, and retrospective screenings, with all films presented with English subtitles.

Russian-British Co-Production and Distribution Forum

In 2011, Academia Rossica, supported by the Russian Cinema Fund and in partnership with the British Film Institute, launched this new initiative between the Russian and British film industries, as part of the Russian film festival. The forum brings together leading UK and Russian film professionals, helping to integrate Russian cinema into the international cultural scene, and explores and develops opportunities of collaboration and partnership.

Kinoklub

KinoKlub, London's premier Russian Film Club, launched at the Apollo Piccadilly in 2011. It shows new Russian films with English subtitles every month, introduced by directors, actors and producers. The club is open to the public, with members entitled to special rates and exclusive members-only events.

== Literature ==
READ RUSSIA!, London Book Fair, BookExpo America and other international book fairs

With the support of the Russian Federal Agency for Press and Mass Communications, Rospechat, Academia Rossica organises the official Russian pavilion at several international book fairs, with the aim of encouraging the integration of Russian publishers into the international publishing industry, as well as the global promotion of Russian literature. Academia Rossica represents the key Russian publishers at the major international book fairs as well as organises extensive industry focused programmes of seminars and discussions with the participation of the leading contemporary Russian writers and critics. 2011 saw Russia celebrated as the Guest of Honour at the London Book Fair. The event was highlighted by President Dmitry Medvedev as a key example of strong cultural relations between Russia and Great Britain at a joint press conference with David Cameron.

SLOVO Russian Literature Festival. Words in action!

Launched in 2008, SLOVO festival features contemporary Russian fiction, Russian poetry, and Russian non-fiction. The annual festival brings acclaimed contemporary Russian authors to the UK to hold readings, and discussions in venues across London and the rest of the country.

The International Lounge at the Moscow International Book Fair

With the support of the Russian Federal Agency for Press and Mass Communications Rospechat, Academia Rossica organises the International Lounge at Russia's biggest book fair. The MIBF International Lounge is a space specially designed to help international publishers explore Russia's literary scene and seek out business opportunities in Russia. The lounge assists collaboration between Russian and international publishers.

== Journal ==
Academia Rossica publishes Rossica, an arts journal, which covers a wide range of topics presenting various pieces of contemporary Russian writing and art, architecture and film. It aims to provide a unique insight into both Russia's enigmatic history and its latest cultural events and developments.

== The Rossica Translation Prize ==
The Rossica Translation Prize is the only prize in the world awarded for the best new translation of Russian literature into English. It aims to raise the international profile of translators and the art of literary translation, as well as that of contemporary Russian literature. The prize is open to works published in any country. The value of the prize is £5,000, divided between the winning translator and the publisher.

== The Rossica Young Translators Award ==
The Rossica Young Translators Prize was inaugurated alongside the main Rossica Translation Prize in 2009 with the goal of cultivating interest in contemporary Russian literature among younger generations. The competition attracts translators aged 25 and below from universities around the world seeking recognition, opportunities for career development, and a potential cash prize.
