= The Fiery Angel (novel) =

1908 novel by Valery Bryusov

- Author: Valery Bryusov
- Original title: Огненный ангел
- Translator: Ivor Montagu and Sergei Nalbandov
- Language: Russian
- Publisher: Scorpion (Russian), Humphrey Toulmin (English)
- Publication date: 1908
- Publication place: Russian Empire
- English publication date: 1930
- Media type: Print (hardback & paperback)
- Pages: 214+130 (Russian); 392 (English)
- OCLC: 6414689

The Fiery Angel (Russian: Огненный ангел, Ognenny Angel) is a Gothic novel by the Russian writer Valery Bryusov. The novel is a meticulous account of sixteenth-century Germany, notably Cologne and the world of the occult. Characters such as Heinrich Cornelius Agrippa and Faust appear alongside a description of a Black Mass.

== Plot ==
Set in sixteenth-century Germany, it depicts a love triangle between Renata, a passionate young woman; Ruprecht, a knight; and Madiel, the Fiery Angel. The novel tells the story of Ruprecht's attempts to win the love of Renata, whose spiritual integrity is seriously undermined by her participation in occult practices. This love triangle is now recognised to be that which existed between the author, Bryusov, the symbolist novelist Andrei Bely and their shared lover, the nineteen-year-old Nina Petrovskaya.

== Reception ==
The Fiery Angel is generally regarded as a work of painstaking research and heightened emotion in which the author's comprehensive knowledge of the esoteric is displayed. Its modernity is reflected in its tension between sexuality and spirituality.

The Fiery Angel has been compared to Mikhail Bulgakov's The Master and Margarita for its general theme of the occult, to Joris-Karl Huysmans's Là-bas for its description of a Black Mass, and to Aldous Huxley's The Devils of Loudun for its depiction of religious hysteria.

The composer Sergey Prokofiev based his opera of the same name upon Bryusov's novel.

== Publication ==
The novel was first serialized in the Russian literary monthly Vesy in 1907–08, and then published in two volumes in 1908. The novel was translated by Ivor Montagu and Sergei Nalbandov in 1930. A new edition with an afterword by Gary Lachman was published in 2005.
