= Anna Lavrinenko =

Russian writer

Anna Lavrinenko is a Russian writer. She was born and raised in Yaroslavl. She studied law at Yaroslavl State University and now works as a lawyer in the city.

Since her debut in 2006, she has been widely published in Russian literary journals. One of her best-known stories Eight Hours to Sunrise has been made into a screenplay. Her work has been translated into English and French. A short story collection titled Yaroslavl Stories was published in 2014 under the Glas New Russian Writing imprint.
