= The Kukotsky Enigma =

2001 novel by Lyudmila Ulitskaya

The Kukotsky Enigma (The Kukotsky Case)
- English edition (2016)
- Author: Lyudmila Ulitskaya
- Original title: Казус Кукоцкого
- Translator: Diane Nemec Ignashev
- Language: English
- Genre: Novel
- Published: 2001
- Publisher: Northwestern University Press (English)
- Publication place: United States
- English publication date: August 2016
- Media type: Print (Paperback)
- Pages: 392 pp
- ISBN: 9780810133488

The Kukotsky Enigma (Russian: Казус Кукоцкого) is a novel by acclaimed Russian novelist and public intellectual Lyudmila Ulitskaya. The Kukotsky Enigma won the 2001 Russian Booker Prize. With five, Ulitskaya holds the record for the most nominations for that prestigious award. In 2005, a television series based on the novel by director Yuri Grymov was aired in Russia. Critics suggest that the book's focus on abortion (from 1936 to 1955 it was allowed in the USSR only for medical reasons) offers a new reading of Stalinism through the lens of family life and the female body.

== Plot summary ==
The novel follows the life of the family of gynecologist Pavel Alekseevich Kukotsky. The story follows him from Stalin’s 1936 ban on abortions through the mid-1960s.

The novel consists of four parts. The first describes the life of the Kukotsky family members before the 1960s: his wife Yelena, their adopted daughter Tanya, a classmate Toma, and a former nun working as a housekeeper in Yelena’s home. The second part is a dream Yelena experiences while hovering between life and death. The third part covers the family's life after 1960 and up to Tanya's death. The fourth part forms a brief epilogue.

== Editions ==
- 2001, Russian Federation, Izdatelstvo Ast, Pub date 2001
- The Kukotsky Enigma translated by Diane Nemec Ignashev. Northwestern University Press, 15 August 2016; ISBN 978-0-8101-3348-8
