= Rossica =

Magazine focusing on Russian arts, published in London

Rossica is an arts magazine published in London by Academia Rossica. The first issue of the journal appeared in 2001. Rossica is published on a biannual basis. The magazine covers diverse topics, such as contemporary Russian writing, the story and collection of the Moscow Tretyakov Gallery, and the disappearing architectural heritage of Moscow. It also presents recent translations of contemporary Russian literature into English.
