= Doctorow =

Doctorow is a surname. Notable people with the surname include:

- E. L. Doctorow (1931–2015), American novelist and editor
- Cory Doctorow (born 1971), American blogger, activist, and science fiction author

== See also ==
- Dokhturov, a Russian surname
