= Lyudmila Bogomolova =

Soviet ballerina

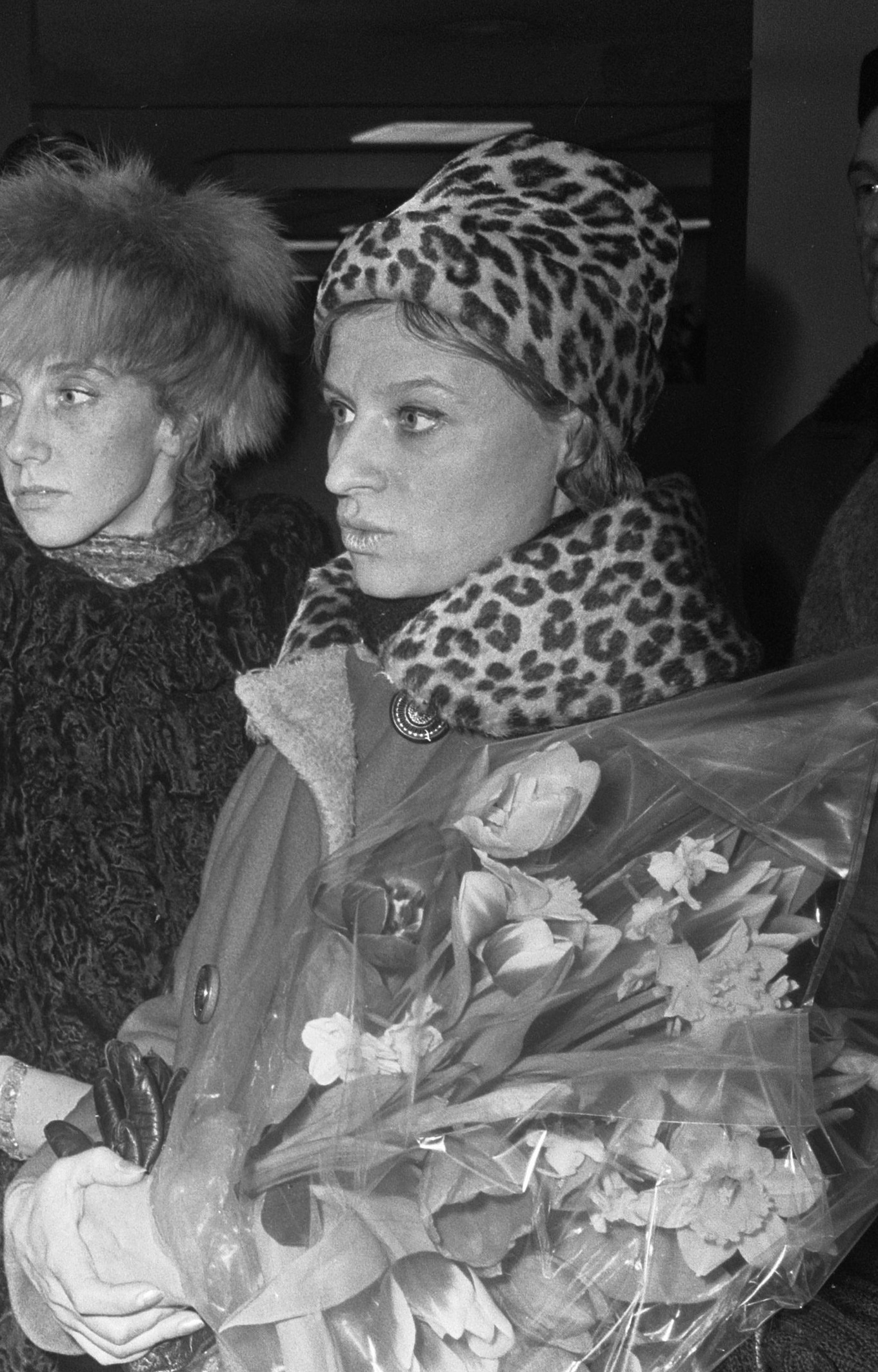
Lyudmila Bogomolova in the Netherlands in 1968

Lyudmila Ivanovna Bogomolova (later Nikonova, Russian: Людмила Ивановна Богомолова-Никонова, born 25 March 1932 in Moscow) is a retired Soviet ballerina.

== Biography ==
Between 1946 and 1951 Bogomolova studied at the Moscow State Academy of Choreography, and after graduation was accepted to the Bolshoi Ballet, eventually becoming its soloist. She retired in 1971 and until 1988 taught classical dance at the Academy of Choreography; between 1978 and 1980 she also worked as a choreographer at Bolshoi. In 1959 she became the Honored Artist of Russia.

Bogomolova married two ballet dancers, Stanislav Vlasov and then Vladimir Nikonov. She has two sons, Leonid Nikonov (born 1961, first marriage) and Andrei Nikonov (born 1970, second marriage). Both sons became ballet soloists at Bolshoi.

== See also ==
- List of Russian ballet dancers
