= Lyudmila Ulitskaya =

Russian author (born 1943)

Lyudmila Ulitskaya Людмила Улицкая
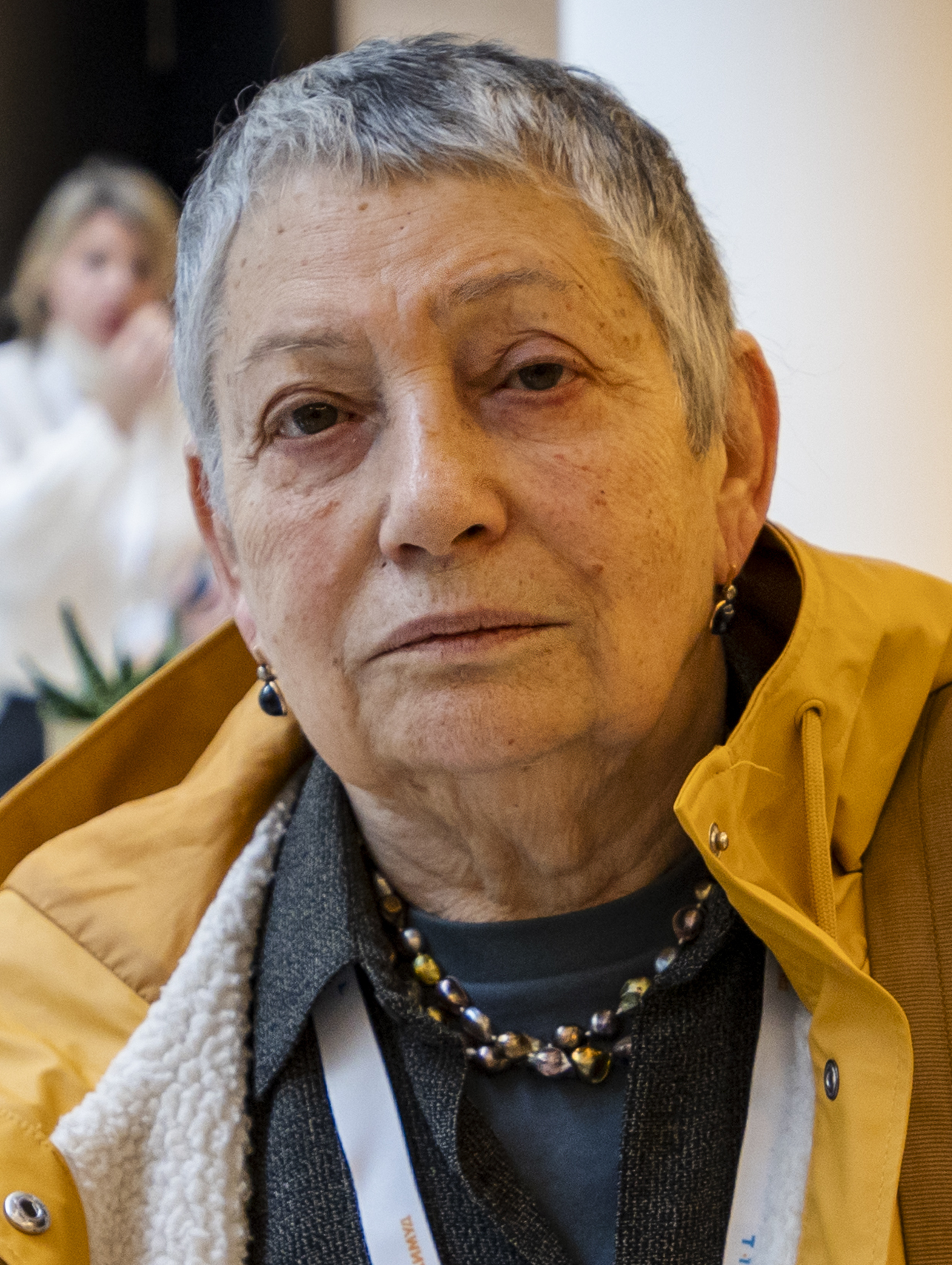
- Ulitskaya in 2023
- Born: February 21, 1943 (age 83); Davlekanovo, Russian SFSR, Soviet Union
- Education: Moscow State University
- Spouse: Andrej Krasulin
- Writing career
- Genres: Fiction, script writing
- Notable works: Sonechka "The Big Green Tent" "Jacob's Ladder"; The Funeral Party; Medea and Her Children; Daniel Stein, Interpreter “Just the Plague”
- Literary movement: Aestheticism
- Website: elkost.com/authors/ulitskaya

Lyudmila Evgenyevna Ulitskaya (Russian: Людмила Евгеньевна Улицкая, born February 21, 1943) is an internationally acclaimed modern Russian novelist and short-story writer who, in 2014, was awarded the prestigious Austrian State Prize for European Literature for her oeuvre. In 2006 she published Daniel Stein, Interpreter (Даниэль Штайн, переводчик), a novel dealing with the Holocaust and the need for reconciliation between Judaism, Christianity, and Islam. She won the 2012 Park Kyong-ni Prize.

== Biography ==
Ulitskaya was born in the town of Davlekanovo in Bashkiria but her family moved to Moscow when she was nine months old. In Moscow, her family lived in communal apartments with many other families. After childhood, she received a degree in genetics from the Moscow State University. After university, she worked for two years at the Institute of General Genetics, before she was fired in 1970 for reading and distributing samizdat literature. After this, she didn't work for about nine years. In this time she was married and then had two kids. Then Ulitskaya began her literary career by joining the Jewish drama theatre as a literary consultant in 1979. She became the Repertory Director of the Hebrew Theatre of Moscow. Her first published short fiction appeared in 1990. The story of her acclaimed novel Sonechka was first published in Novy Mir in 1992. In 1993, she published her first novel with Gallimard in France. Her first novel in Russian was published in 1994. Until 2022, Ulitskaya divided her time between Moscow and Israel. Since 2022, Ulitskaya resides in Berlin, Germany.

=== Personal life ===
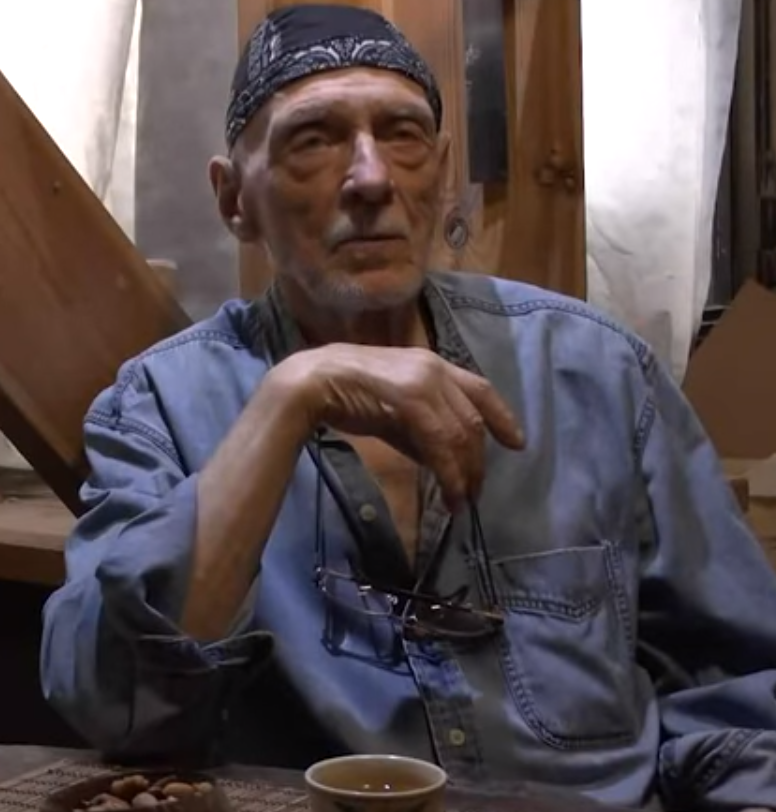
Ulitskaya's third and current husband, Soviet and Russian sculptor Andrey Nikolaevich Krasulin (b. 1934) in July 2014

Ulitskaya's parents were both involved in science: her mother was a biochemist and her father was an engineer. She was engaged to an American man who died in a car accident before they were married. Throughout her life, she has learned German, French, and English, but has said herself that she doesn't know any of them well. She has mentioned that she tends to work in Italy, at an apartment she owns, but she lived in Moscow until 2022.

Lyudmila Ulitskaya has married three times. Her first husband is Yuri Taits. Her second husband is Mikhail Evgeniev, a geneticist and Doctor of Biological Sciences. She had two sons with Evgeniev: Aleksey (born 1972; businessman) and Pyotr (born 1975; jazz musician), one of whom graduated from Columbia University. As of 2024, she is married to the sculptor Andrey Krasulin.

== Fiction ==
=== Style ===
In her fiction, Ulitskaya seemingly describes and observes her characters at an equal distance from each one. Rather than going in for character development or delving into the tortured workings of her characters’ psyches otherwise perceived as the hallmark of Russian writing, Ulitskaya favors capsule descriptions, though she acknowledges that her characters are tortured. Generally speaking, she makes little use of dialogue. Masha Gessen, in her tribute article in The New Yorker in October 2014, finds that Ulitskaya's writing makes for compelling, addictive reading. Gessen reports that she was driven entirely by the desire to learn what happens next.

=== Themes ===
Among her interlinked themes are: the need for religious and racial tolerance; the problem of the intelligentsia in Soviet culture; how women shape new gender roles in society; and everyday life as a literary subject.

== Other activity ==
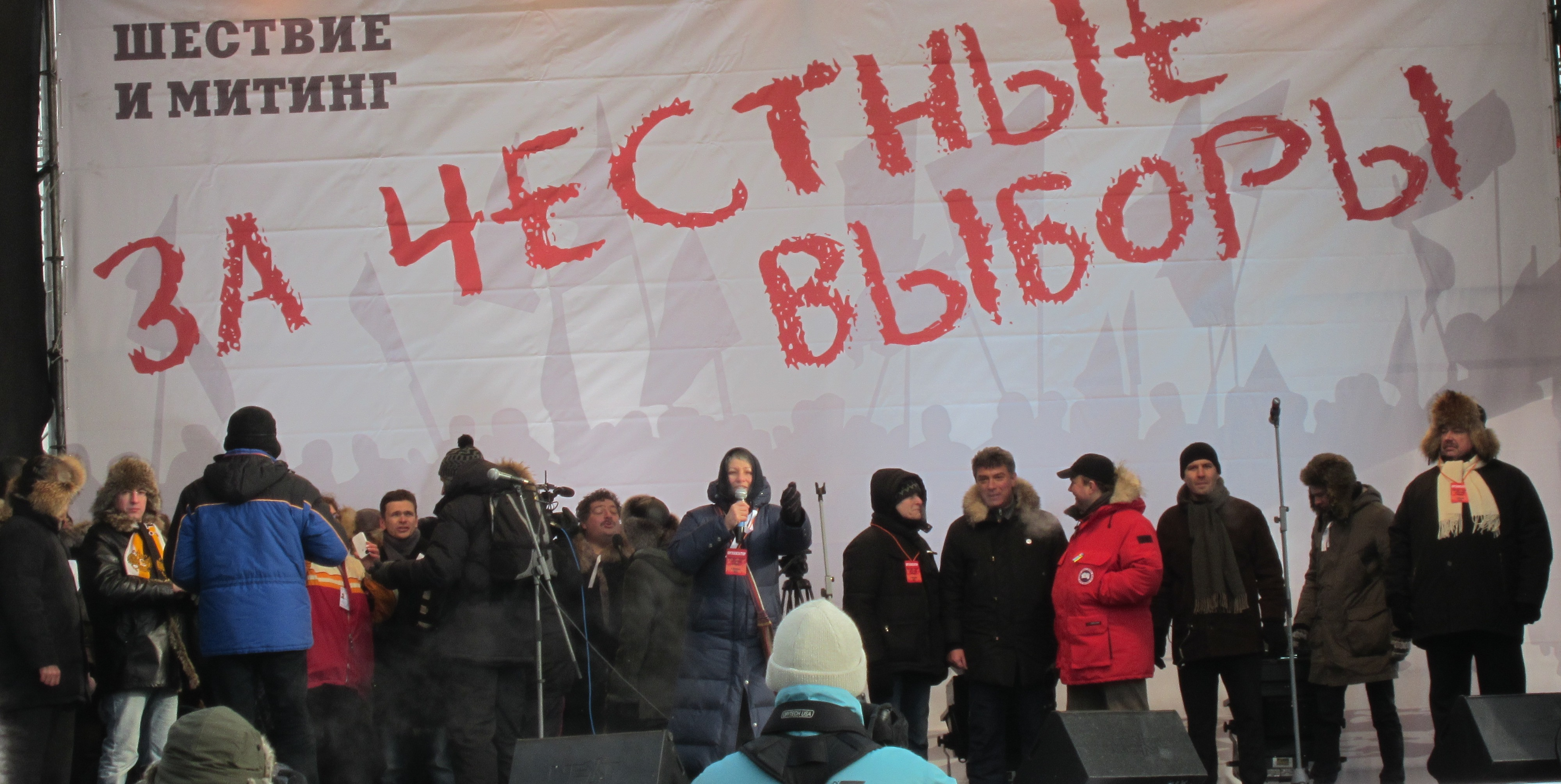
Lyudmila Ulitskaya on Bolotnaya Square in Moscow in February 2012

Ulitskaya authored two movie scripts produced in the early 1990s: The Liberty Sisters (Сестрички Либерти, 1990) and A Woman for All (Женщина для всех, 1991). She regularly publishes commentary on social issues and is actively involved in philanthropic projects increasing access to literature. In March 2014 Ulitskaya was among the key speakers at the Moscow Anti-War demonstration.

== Reception ==
Ulitskaya's first novella, Sonechka (Сонечка, 1992), and her second, Medea and Her Children (Медея и ее дети, 1996) became extremely popular, and both were shortlisted for the Russian Booker Award, in 1993 and 1997, respectively. She finally won the Russian Booker Prize in 2001 for The Kukotsky Enigma (Казус Кукоцкого, 2001), and was the first woman to receive the prize. Her novel Daniel Stein, Interpreter (Даниэль Штайн, переводчик, 2006) was nominated for the Man Booker Prize. Her works have been translated into over 25 languages, including English, and have received several international and Russian literary awards. The English translation for The Big Green Tent (Зелёный шатёр, 2010) was long-listed for the Best Translated Book Award in Fiction in 2016.

== Political involvement ==
Because Ulitskaya addresses both religion and politics in her work, she has moved to the forefront of the Russian political debate in recent decades. In 2011 and 2012, during the height of the anti-Putin protests in Russia, she became a board member for the League of Voters. She was also considered a traitor by the administration and was the subject of negative statements in state-owned outlets, such as Isvestia. She is firmly anti-Putin; at a press conference for her book The Big Green Tent (Зелёный шатёр, 2010), she remarked that the country was becoming "Stalinized," something that gave her "a whiff of fear."

However, she is very against the idea of Moscow being a cultural part of Europe, unlike other anti-Putin dissidents such as Alexei Navalny.

While Mikhail Khodorkovsky, a Russian billionaire jailed on fraud charges, was incarcerated, he and Ulitskaya wrote each other letters. Ulitskaya maintains that the charges against him were politically motivated and thus "absurd." Their correspondence was published in a collection titled Mikhail Khodorkovsky: Articles, Dialogues, Interviews along with contributions from other writers such as Boris Strugatsky and Boris Akunin.

On the second day of the Russian war against Ukraine in 2022, Novaya Gazeta published a statement by Ulitskaya, Pain. Fear. Shame., strongly condemning the war. She was also among the signatories of an appeal by eminent writers to all Russian speakers to spread the truth about the war inside Russia. Since March 2022, she has been living in Berlin.

== Awards ==
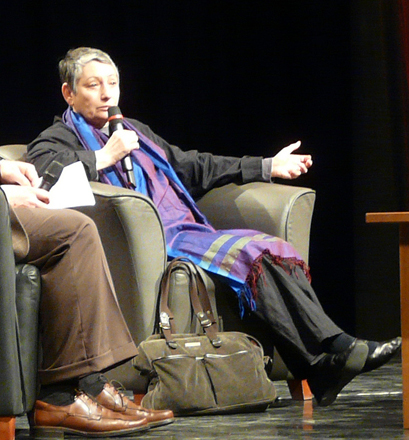
Lyudmila Ulitskaya as guest of honour at the 2009 16th International Book Festival, Millenáris, Budapest

- Penne Prize (1997, Italy)
- Medici Prize (1998, France)
- Giuseppe Acerbi Award it:Premio Letterario Giuseppe Acerbi (1998, Italy) for her novel Sonechka
- Penne Prize Winner (2000, Moscow) for Medea and Her Children
- Chevalier of the Ordre des Palmes Académiques (2003, France)
- Novel of the Year Prize (2004, Russia) for the novel Sincerely yours, Shurik
- Best Writer of the Year Ivanushka Prize (2004, Russia)
- Chevalier of the Ordre des Arts et des Lettres (2004, France)
- National Order of the Legion of Honour (2004, 2014, France)
- National Literature Prize (2005, China) for Sincerely yours, Shurik
- Penne Prize (2006, Italy) for the novel The Kukotsky Enigma
- National Olympia Prize of Russian Academy of Business (2007, Russia)
- Big Book Award (2007, Russia) for the novel Daniel Stein, Interpreter
- Father Alexander Men Award (2008, Germany-Russia)
- 2009 Man Booker International Prize nominee, along with 14 authors from 12 countries: Mario Vargas Llosa, E.L Doctorow and 2001 Nobel Prize winner V. S. Naipaul
- Simone de Beauvoir Prize (2011, France)
- Russian Booker Prize (2011, Russia) for the novel The Kukotsky Enigma
- Pak Kyong-ni Prize (2012, South Korea)
- Austrian State Prize for European Literature (2014, Austria)
- Big Book Award, 3rd place (2016, Russia) for Yakov's Ladder
- Officer of the Legion of Honor
- Siegfried Lenz Prize (2020)
- Prix Formentor (2022)

== Bibliography ==
=== Novels ===
- Sonechka (Сонечка, 1995)
- Medea and Her Children (Медея и её дети, 1996)
- The Funeral Party (Весёлые похороны, 1997)
- The Kukotsky Enigma (Казус Кукоцкого, 2001)
- Women's Lies (Сквозная линия (Through Line), 2003)
- Sincerely Yours, Shurik (Искренне ваш Шурик, 2003)
- The People of Our Tsar (Люди нашего царя, Moscow, 2005)
- Daniel Stein, Interpreter (Даниэль Штайн, переводчик, Moscow, 2006), a greatly fictionalized story of Oswald Rufeisen
- Imago / The Big Green Tent (Зелёный шатёр, 2010)
- Tomorrow There Will Be Happiness (Детство 45-53. А завтра будет счастье, 2013)
- Yakov's Ladder (Лестница Якова, 2015)

=== Collections ===
- Poor Relatives (Бедные родственники, 1993)
- Girls (Девочки, 2002)
- Childhood Forty-Nine (Детство сорок девять, 2003)
- The Queen of Spades (Первые и последние; Literal translation: 'First and Last', 2004)
- The Story about Ignatius the Cat, Fedya the Chimney-Sweep, and the Lonely Mouse (История про кота Игнасия, трубочиста Федю и Одинокую Мышь, 2004)
- The Story about old Kulebyakin, Mila the Whining Horse, and her Colt Ravki (История о старике Кулебякине, плаксивой кобыле Миле и жеребёнке Равкине, 2004)
- The Story about Antwerpen the Sparrow, Mikheev the Cat, the Aloe Vasya and the centipede Marya Semyonovna with her family (История про воробья Антверпена, кота Михеева, столетника Васю и сороконожку Марью Семёновну с семьёй, 2005)
- Discarded Relics (Священный мусор, 2012)
- The Body of the Soul (О теле души, 2019)
- Paper Theatre: Non-Prose (Бумажный театр: непроза, 2020)

=== Short stories ===
- "The Fugitive" published in The New Yorker (2014)
- "The Autopsy" published in The New Yorker (2023)

=== Plays and Screenplays ===
- Russian Jam and Other Plays (Русское варенье и другое, Moscow, 2005)
- Just the Plague (English translation; 1988, 2020)

== Online text ==
- Kukotsky's Case full text (in Russian)
