= Glas (publisher) =

Glas was a Russian publishing house. It was established by Natasha Perova in 1991, and was instrumental in translating the works of Sigizmund Krzhizhanovsky, Victor Pelevin, and Vladimir Sorokin and introducing them to the West.

"Glas has published 75 titles over 24 years, but, since half of them are anthologies, these volumes contain 170 different authors “representing various trends and types” of Russian literature."

Glas books twice won the Rossica Prize, and were praised by George Steiner, Isaiah Berlin and Tibor Fischer.

It suspended activity in 2014.

== Reception ==
Tibor Fischer, writing in The Guardian, said:

"It is a tribute to the material in Glas 40: War and Peace that it reads almost as if no one has written about war before. Glas magazine, which launches Russian writing into the English-speaking world, has quietly championed some forgotten, some unrecognised and some new writers, and it has hit the jackpot with this collection."

== Writers ==
- Arkady Babchenko
- Anna Lavrinenko
- Victor Pelevin
- Vladimir Sorokin
- Lyudmila Ulitskaya

=== Fiction ===
- Svetlana Alexievich
- Vassily Aksyonov
- Peter Aleshkovsky
- Maria Arbatova
- Victor Astafiev
- Victor Beilis
- Andrei Bitov
- Mikhail Bulgakov
- Yuri Buida
- Denis Butov
- Dmitry Bykov
- Vasil Bykov

=== Translators ===
- Robert Chandler (The Portable Platonov)
- Joanne Turnbull
