= Vesy =

Russian symbolist magazine

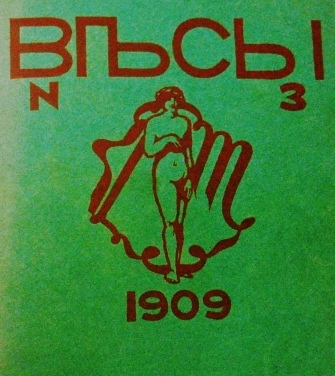
- 1909 cover of Vesy
- Editor: Valery Bryusov
- Frequency: Monthly
- First issue: January 1904
- Final issue: December 1909
- Based in: Moscow
- Language: Russian

Vesy (Russian: Весы́; English: The Balance or The Scales) was a Russian symbolist magazine published in Moscow from 1904 to 1909, with the financial backing of philanthropist S. A. Polyakov. It was edited by the major symbolist writer Valery Bryusov.

== History ==
Vesy was the leading literary magazine of the Russian symbolist movement. The first issue featured Bryusov's The Keys of Mysteries, a major statement of symbolist doctrine. It reported on contemporary art and literature in Western Europe, and had many foreign correspondents. It was originally created as a magazine of criticism and information, but in 1906 it was expanded to include poetry and prose. Vesy published the works of all the major Russian symbolists, including Alexander Blok, Andrei Bely, Zinaida Gippius, Konstantin Balmont, Fyodor Sologub, Vyacheslav Ivanov, and those of Bryusov himself, along with the works of other major writers close to the symbolist movement, like Maximilian Voloshin and Mikhail Kuzmin. Vesy also published a wide variety of translations.

Vesy was lavishly designed and illustrated, often by artists of the World of Art movement. Bryusov's critical writing offered models of clarity and skill, and his scholarly editorial approach had a major impact on Russian editorial practice in the early twentieth century. Eventually the magazine served as a medium for disputes between symbolists like Bely and Ivanov who wanted to make symbolism a religious and cultural movement, and those who saw symbolism strictly as an artistic movement, like Bryusov himself. Vesy was published during the most productive years of Russian symbolism.
