= Vladimir Bogomolov (bodyguard) =

Soviet security officer

Vladimir Bogomolov (center) next to Leonid Brezhnev (right)

Vladimir Viktorovich Bogomolov (Russian: Владимир Викторович Богомолов; c. 1945 – 2009) was a Soviet security officer and a bodyguard of Leonid Brezhnev.

Bogomolov's father, Viktor, was a personal bodyguard of Joseph Stalin during and after World War II, and was awarded the Order of the Red Star for his work during Stalin's trip to the front in August 1941. Viktor was personally known to Stalin and stood at his coffin at the funeral in 1953. After that he worked as a bodyguard of Georgy Zhukov and other highly ranked Soviet military officials. Viktor had exceptional shooting skills and physical power, and was capable of engaging several opponents at once in traditional wrestling.

Vladimir followed in the footsteps of his father. In 1969 he graduated from the KGB school in Saint Petersburg and received advanced training in shooting, wrestling, running and swimming. After graduation, for two years he supported routine surveillance and transportation security of Soviet leaders. In December 1971 he joined the 9th Department of KGB that was responsible for protection of Leonid Brezhnev. He remained a bodyguard for Brezhnev until Brezhnev's death in 1982, saving him from several potentially fatal driving and swimming accidents. Brezhnev personally knew Bogomolov and protected him from being discharged for minor disciplinary offenses. Brezhnev traveled a lot, so that in 1974 alone, his security team spent 276 days away from Moscow.

In December 1978, a truck collided at high speed with the car carrying Bogomolov and other security officers. Bogomolov spent nine hours in a coma and needed more than two months to recover, after which he returned to Brezhnev's security team.

After Brezhnev's death, Bogomolov guarded other Soviet and foreign officials, including the Afghan leader Mohammad Najibullah. Najibullah did not trust his own security and ordered Bogomolov to shoot any suspicious person in an emergency. After retiring, Bogomolov taught his skills at the Russian Bodyguard Academy.

== Sources ==
- Robin Barratt (24 February 2011). The Mammoth Book of Hard Bastards. Constable & Robinson Limited. pp. 142–148. ISBN 978-1-84901-759-6. Russian version
