= Nikolai Bogomolov =

Russian ice hockey player

- Born: May 30, 1991 (age 34) Moscow, Russia
- Height: 5 ft 9 in (175 cm)
- Weight: 179 lb (81 kg; 12 st 11 lb)
- Position: Defence
- Shoots: Left
- ALIH team Former teams: PSK Sakhalin; HC Vityaz
- NHL draft: Undrafted
- Playing career: 2009–present

Nikolai Olegovich Bogomolov (Russian: Николай Олегович Богомолов; born May 30, 1991) is a Russian professional ice hockey defenceman currently playing for PSK Sakhalin of Asia League Ice Hockey.

Bogomolov his professional debut with HC Vityaz Podolsk of the Kontinental Hockey League (KHL) during the 2009–10 season and went on to play 27 games for the team from 2009 to 2013.
