= Andrei Bely =

Russian poet, writer and critic (1880–1934)

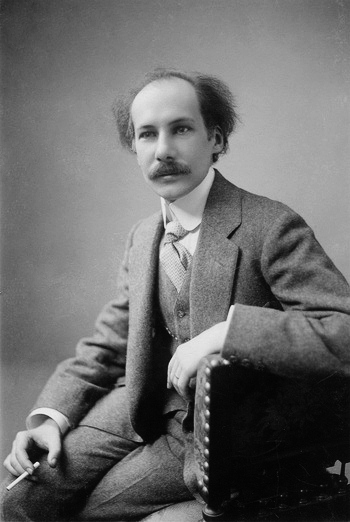
- Bely in 1912
- Born: Boris Nikolaevich Bugaev; 26 October 1880; Moscow, Russia
- Died: 8 January 1934 (aged 53); Moscow, Soviet Union
- Education: Imperial Moscow University (1903)
- Occupations: Prose writer; poet; essayist; literary critic; dramatist
- Father: Nikolai Bugaev
- Writing career
- Period: 1900–1934
- Notable works: The Silver Dove (1910); Petersburg (1913/1922)
- Movements: Russian symbolism; Modernism

Boris Nikolaevich Bugaev (Russian: Бори́с Никола́евич Буга́ев, IPA: [bɐˈrʲis nʲɪkɐˈlajɪvʲɪdʑ bʊˈɡajɪf]; 26 October [O.S. 14 October] 1880 – 8 January 1934), better known by the pen name Andrei Bely or Biely, (Note: Russian: Андре́й Бе́лый, IPA: [ɐnˈdrʲej ˈbʲelɨj]; pre-reform spelling: Андрей Бѣлый.) was a Russian and Soviet novelist, Symbolist poet, theorist and literary critic. He was a committed anthroposophist and follower of Rudolf Steiner. His novel Petersburg (1913/1922) was regarded by Vladimir Nabokov as the third-greatest masterpiece of modernist literature. The Andrei Bely Prize (Премия Андрея Белого), one of the most important prizes in Russian literature, was named after him. His poems were set to music and performed by Russian singer-songwriters.

== Life and career ==
Boris Bugaev was born in Moscow, into a prominent intellectual family. His father, Nikolai Bugaev, was a noted mathematician who is regarded as a founder of the Moscow school of mathematics. His mother, Aleksandra Dmitrievna (née Egorova), was not only highly intelligent but a famous society beauty, and the focus of considerable gossip. She was also a pianist, providing Bugaev his musical education at a young age.

Young Boris grew up at the Arbat, a historical area in Moscow. He was a polymath whose interests included mathematics, biology, chemistry, music, philosophy, and literature. Bugaev attended university at the University of Moscow. He would go on to take part in both the Symbolist movement and the Russian school of neo-Kantianism. Bugaev became friendly with Alexander Blok and his wife; he fell in love with her, which caused tensions between the two poets. Bugaev was invited but was unable to attend their wedding due to his father's death.

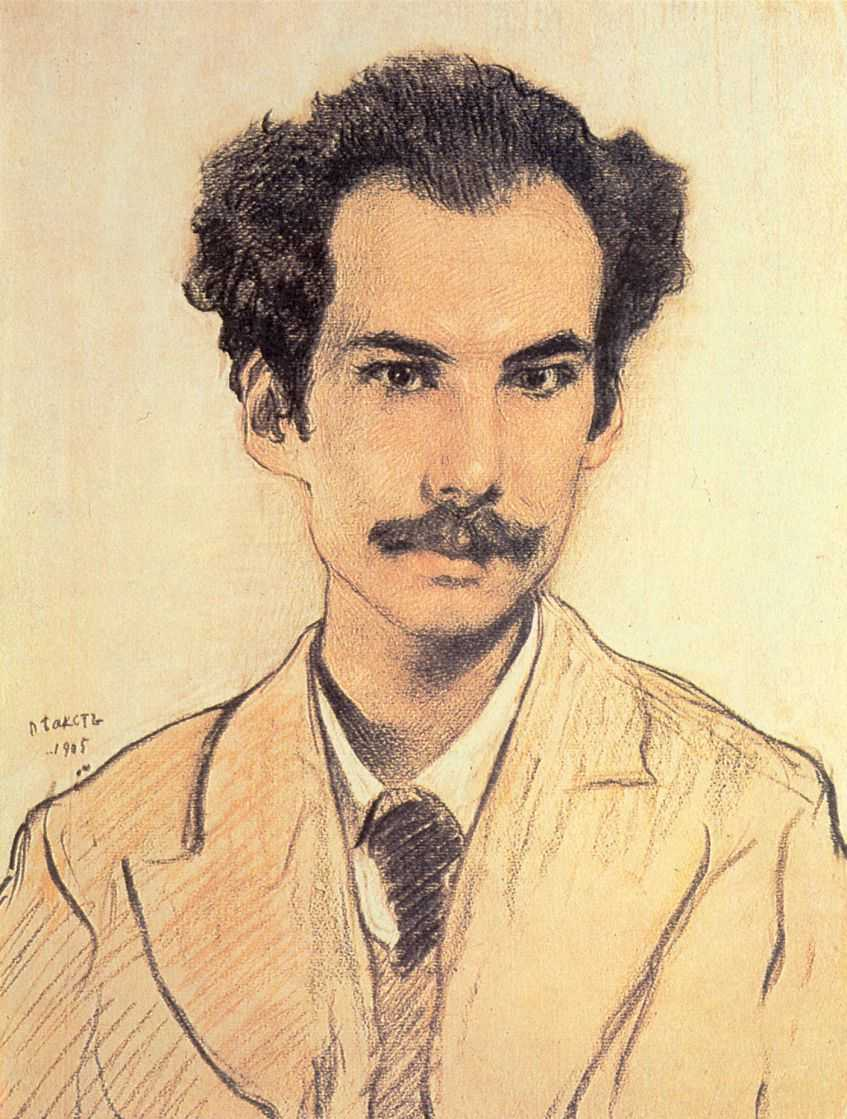
Portrait of Bely by Léon Bakst, 1905

Nikolai Bugaev was well known for his influential philosophical essays, in which he decried geometry and probability and trumpeted the virtues of hard analysis. Despite—or because of—his father's mathematical tastes, Boris Bugaev was fascinated by probability and particularly by entropy, a notion to which he frequently refers in works such as Kotik Letaev.

As a young man, Bely was strongly influenced by his acquaintance with the family of philosopher Vladimir Solovyov, especially Vladimir's younger brother Mikhail, described in his long autobiographical poem The First Encounter (1921); the title is a reflection of Vladimir Solovyov's Three Encounters. It was Mikhail Solovyov who gave Bugaev his pseudonym Andrei Bely.

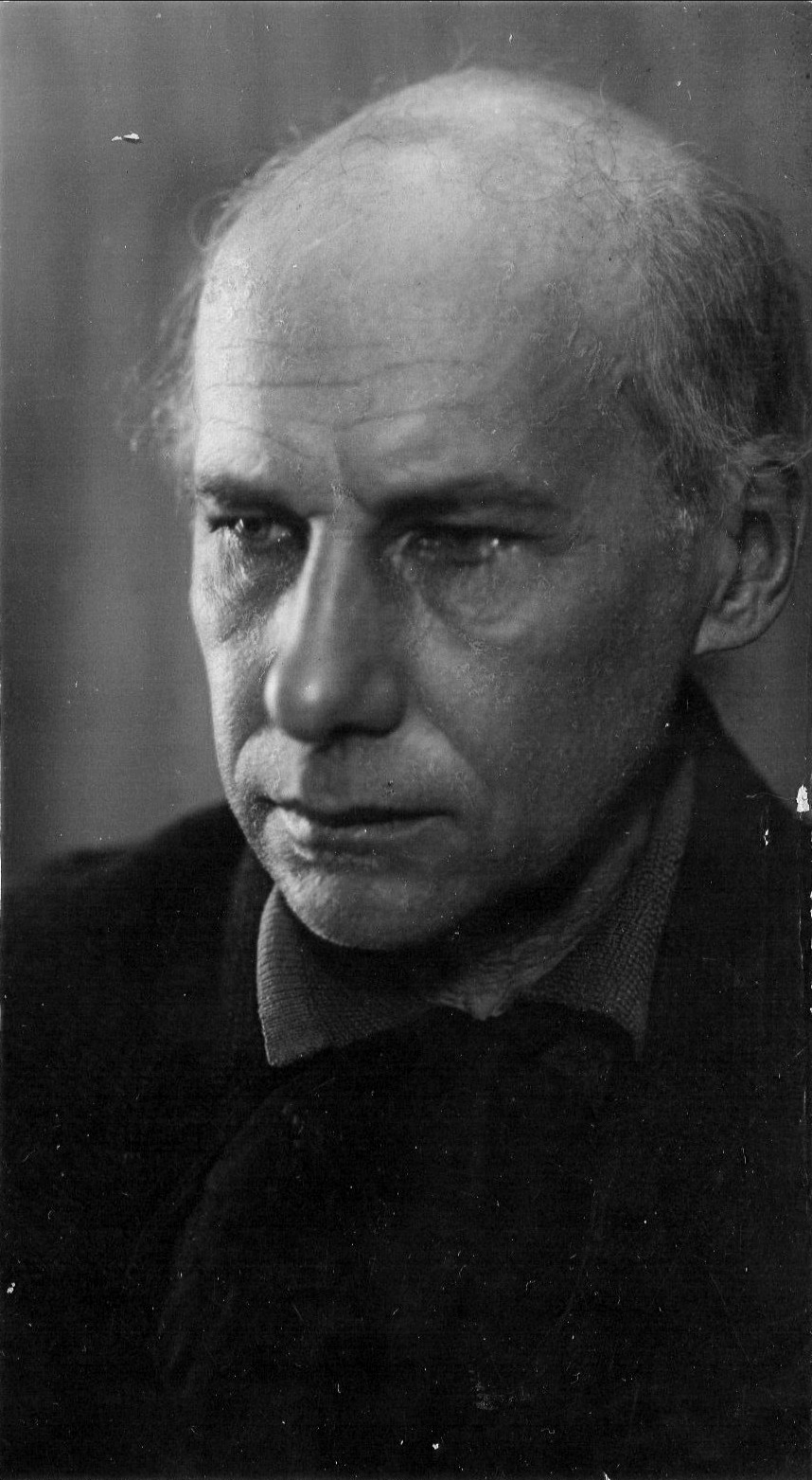
Bely in 1933

In his later years Bely was influenced by Rudolf Steiner's anthroposophy and became a personal friend of Steiner's. His ideas covering this philosophy included his attempts to connect Vladimir Solovyov's philosophical ideas with Steiner's Spiritual Science. One of his notions was the Eternal Feminine, which he equated it with the "world soul" and the "supra-individual ego", the ego shared by all individuals. He spent time between Switzerland, Germany, and Russia, during its revolution. He supported the Bolshevik rise to power and later dedicated his efforts to Soviet culture, serving on the Organizational Committee of the Union of Soviet Writers. He died, aged 53, in Moscow. Several of the numerous poems written in Moscow in January 1934 were inspired by Bely's death.

=== Literary career and legacy ===
Bely did not accomplish his reformation of Russian prose single‐handedly: other major Symbolist novelists, especially Fyodor Sologub and Alexei Remizov, also had a hand in it. It is to Bely's influence, however, more than anyone else's, that we can trace the literary origins of some of the finest early Soviet writers, such as Zamyatin, Pilnyak, Babel and Andrei Platonov ... Moreover, Bely's novels prefigure and map out both the sensibility and the structural devices of the later Western novel with such thoroughness that a person familiar with his work who reads Joyce's Ulysses or Robbe‐Grillet's Jealousy or even Thomas Pynchon's Gravity's Rainbow for the first time can't shake off the feeling that their authors somehow must have known Bely, even though there's not a chance that they did.

— Simon Karlinsky, The New York Times, 1974

Bely started his literary career as the author of The Symphonies, a cycle of experimental prose works, written from 1900 to 1908. In 1909 he published his first novel, The Silver Dove. As critics note, it is notable for its skaz techniques and its unique ornamental prose, for its "ability to capture haunting, mesmerizing sense of apocalyptic doom". The novel is the first part of Bely's unfinished trilogy East or West.

Bely's novel Petersburg (1913/1922), the second part of the unfinished trilogy, is generally considered to be his masterpiece. The book employs a striking prose method in which sounds often evoke colors. The novel is set in the somewhat hysterical atmosphere of turn-of-the-century Petersburg and the Russian Revolution of 1905. To the extent that the book can be said to possess a plot, this can be summarized as the story of the hapless Nikolai Apollonovich, a ne'er-do-well who is caught up in revolutionary politics and assigned the task of assassinating a certain government official – his own father. At one point, Nikolai is pursued through the Petersburg mists by the ringing hooves of the horse in the famous bronze statue of Peter the Great. There are scholars who have suggested that Petersburg included ideas from Sigmund Freud's therapeutic method. An example is the way in which psychoanalysis was used as Bely's interpretive tool for literary criticism, and as a source of creativity.

After the Revolution, Bely wrote two psychological autobiographical novels, highly influenced by Rudolf Steiner's anthroposophy, Kotik Letaev (1918) and The Christened Chinaman (1921). D. S. Mirsky called Kotik Letaev "Bely's most unique and original work", while The Christened Chinaman was called by Mirsky "the most realistic and the most amusing of Bely's works". He also wrote the poems Christ is Risen (1918), in which he glorifies the Revolution; Glossolalia (1917); and The First Encounter (1921).

Bely's last novel is Moscow (1926–1932), an attempt to give an image of Russian intelligentsia during World War I and the Russian Revolution. It differs from The Silver Dove and Petersburg with complex, multi-faceted characters who experience a transformation of personality. It also continues Bely's linguistic experiments. The first part of Moscow, The Moscow Eccentric, was published in English in 2016; the other two have not yet been translated into English.

Bely's essay Rhythm as Dialectic in The Bronze Horseman is cited in Nabokov's novel The Gift, where it is mentioned as "monumental research on rhythm". Fyodor, poet and main character, praises the system Bely created for graphically marking off and calculating the 'half-stresses' in the iambs. Bely found that the diagrams plotted over the compositions of the great poets frequently had the shapes of rectangles and trapeziums. Fyodor, after discovering Bely's work, re-read all his old iambic tetrameters from the new point of view, and was terribly pained to find out that the diagrams for his poems were instead plain and gappy. Nabokov's essay "Notes on Prosody" follows for the large part Bely's essay "Description of the Russian Iambic Tetrameter" (published in the collection of essays Symbolism).

== Selected bibliography ==
=== Novels ===
- The Silver Dove (Серебряный голубь, 1910)
- Petersburg (Петербург, 1913, revised and shortened 1922)
- Kotik Letaev (Котик Летаев, 1918)
- Notes of an Eccentric (1922)
- The Christened Chinaman (Крещёный китаец, 1927)
- Moscow (Москва, 1926–1932)
  - The Moscow Eccentric (Московский чудак, 1926)—Volume 1, Part 1
  - Moskva pod udarom (Москва под ударом, 1926, not translated yet, Moscow Under Siege, Moscow in Jeopardy)—Volume 1, Part 2
  - Maski (Маски, 1932, not translated yet, Masks)—Volume 2

=== Short fiction ===
- Story No. 2 (from the Notes of an Official) (1902)
- A Light Tale (1903)
- We're Waiting for his Return (1903)
- Argonauts (1904)
- The Bush (1906)
- The Mountain Lady (1907)
- Notes on Adam (1908)
- The Yogi (1918)
- Human. the Preface to the novel "Man"—a Chronicle of the 25th Century (1918)
- Return to the Motherland (excerpts from the story, 1922)

=== Poetry ===
- Gold in Azure (Золото в лазури, 1904)
- Ash (Пепел, 1909)
- Urn (Урна, 1909)
- Christ Has Risen (Христос воскрес, 1918)
- The First Encounter (Первое свидание, 1921)
- Glossolalia: Poem about Sound (Глоссолалия. Поэма о звуке, 1922)

=== Symphonies ===
- Second Symphony, the Dramatic (Симфония (2-я, Драматическая), 1902)
- The Northern, or First—Heroic (Северная симфония (1-я, героическая), 1904, written in 1900)
- The Return—Third (Возврат. III симфония, 1905)
- Goblet of Blizzards—Fourth (Кубок метелей. Четвертая симфония, 1908)

=== Essays ===
- Symbolism (Символизм, 1910)
- Green Meadow (Луг зелёный, 1910)
- Arabesques (Арабески, 1911)
- Revolution and Culture (Революция и культура, 1917)
- Recollections of Blok (Воспоминания о Блоке, 1922)
- "Reminiscences of Rudolf Steiner"
- Rhythm as Dialectic in The Bronze Horseman (Ритм как диалектика и «Медный всадник», 1934)
- Gogol's Artistry (Мастерство Гоголя, 1934)

=== Non-fiction ===
- In the Kingdom of Shadows (Одна из обителей царства теней, 1925)
- At the Border of Two Centuries (На рубеже двух столетий, 1930)
- The Beginning of the Century (Начало века, 1933)
- Between Two Revolutions (Между двух революций, 1934)

=== English translations ===
- Petersburg
  - John Cournos, Grove Press, 1959.
  - Robert A. Maguire and John E. Malmstad, Indiana University Press, 1978.
  - David McDuff, Penguin 20th Century Classics, 1995.
  - John Elsworth, Pushkin Press, 2009.
- The Silver Dove
  - George Reavey, Grove Press, 1974.
  - John Elsworth, Northwestern University Press, 2000.
- The Symphonies
  - The Dramatic Symphony, John Elsworth, Grove Press, 1987.
  - The Symphonies, Jonathan Stone, Columbia University Press, 2021.
- Kotik Letaev, Gerald Janecek, Ardis, 1971.
- The Complete Short Stories, Ronald E. Peterson, Ardis, 1979.
- Selected Essays of Andrey Bely, Steven Cassedy, University of California Press, 1985.
- Reminiscences of Rudolf Steiner: Andrei Belyi, Aasya Turgenieff, Margarita Voloshin, Adonis Press, 1987
- The Christened Chinaman, Thomas Beyer, Hermitage Publishers, (a publisher specializing in Russian writers in English translation, started and owned by Igor Yefimov), 1991.
- In the Kingdom of Shadows, Catherine Spitzer, Hermitage Publishers, 2001.
- Glossolalia, Thomas Beyer, SteinerBooks, 2004.
- Gogol's Artistry, Christopher Colbach, Northwestern University Press, 2009
- The Moscow Eccentric, Brendan Kiernan, Russian Life Books, 2016.

== See also ==
- Alexander Blok
- Aleksey Remizov
- Fyodor Sologub
- Russian Symbolism
- Russian literature

== Sources ==
- Imperial Moscow University: 1755-1917: encyclopedic dictionary. Moscow: Russian political encyclopedia (ROSSPEN). 2010. p. 63. ISBN 978-5-8243-1429-8 – via A. Andreev, D. Tsygankov.
