= Eugene Ivanov (artist) =

Russian-Czech contemporary artist and painter

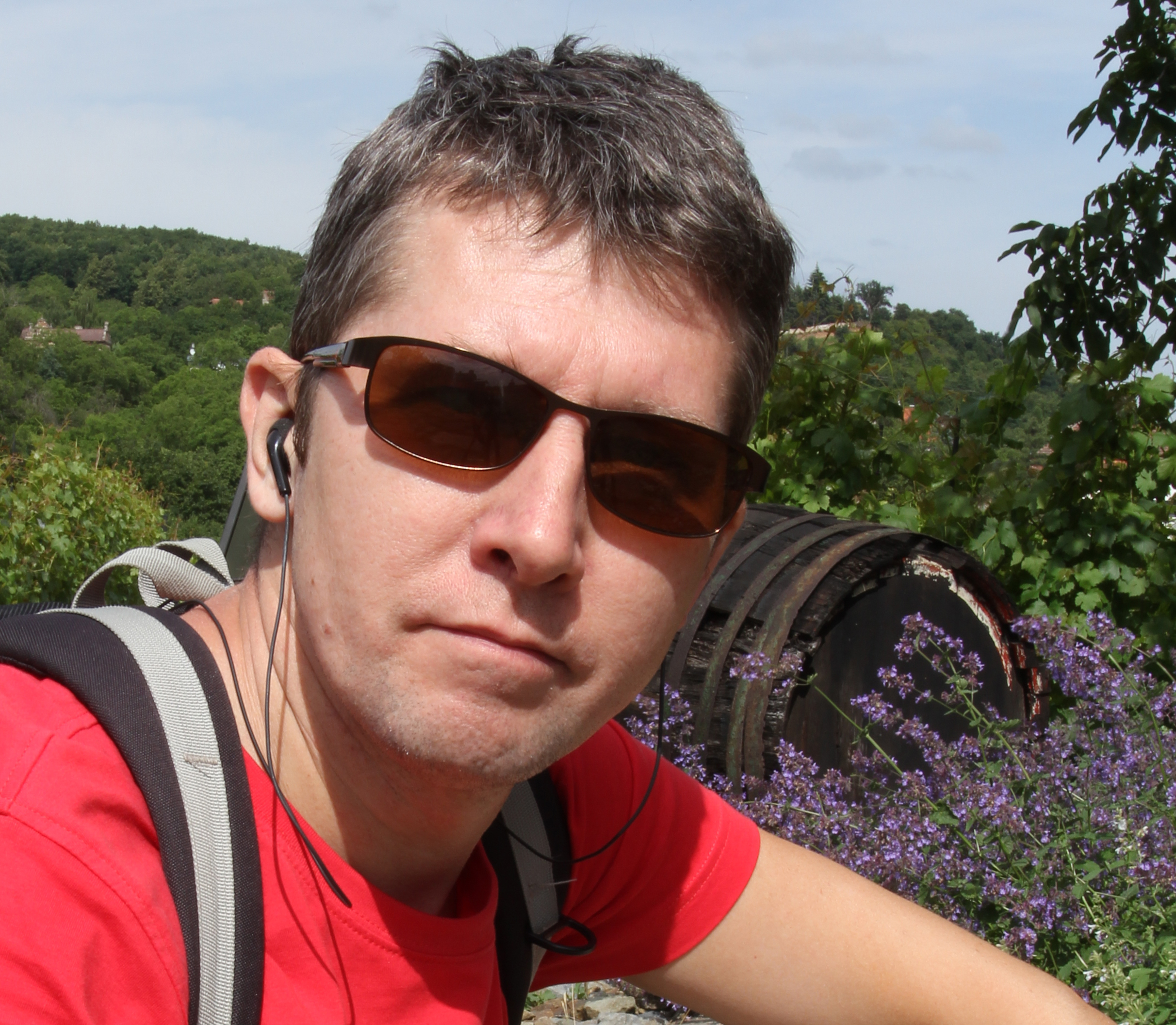
- Ivanov in 2013
- Born: 19 January 1966 (age 60); Tyumen, Soviet Union
- Known for: Painting, illustration
- Website: Official website

Eugene Ivanov (Czech: Evžen Ivanov; Russian: Евгений Иванов; born 19 January 1966) is a Russian-Czech contemporary artist, painter, graphic artist and illustrator. Since 1998, he has been living and working in Prague, Czech Republic.

== Biography ==
Russian-Czech painter and book illustrator, Ivanov, was born in 1966 in Tyumen, Siberia, Russia. Since 1998 he has lived and worked in Prague, Czech Republic. Ivanov's artworks are founded on dreams and of the unconscious. Ivanov's imagery is suffused with surrealistic poetry. Along with his oil paintings and watercolours, Eugene Ivanov has illustrated over 200 books. He has had numerous solo exhibitions and his works are collected internationally. In his art, the artist unites elements of the landscape realism, motifs of yards and back streets of the Prague´s Old Town, or the classical still-life with modern styles of the beginning of the 20th century – cubism, suprematism and expressionism.

== Selected exhibitions ==
- 2026. 29th Film flap salon. National Museum (Prague), Czech Republic
- 2025. 28th Film flap salon. National Museum (Prague), Czech Republic
- 2024. 27th Film flap salon. Hybernia Theatre, Prague, Czech Republic
- 2023. KLAPKA TOUR 2023. Hybernia Theatre, Prague, Czech Republic
- 2022. 25th anniversary of the Film flap salon. Hybernia Theatre, Prague, Czech Republic
- 2018. Solo Exhibition. Zojak gallery, Prague, Czech Republic
- 2017. Francysk Skaryna and Prague, National Library of the Czech Republic, Clementinum, Prague, Czech Republic
- 2017. Solo Exhibition, Gallery by Jiří Konečný, Veselí nad Moravou, Czech Republic
- 2013. Solo Exhibition, Krček Gallery. Ostrožská Nová Ves, Czech Republic
- 2010. Solo Exhibition, Russian Centre Of Science And Culture, Prague, Czech Republic
- 2009. "At the Water’s Edge" Solo Exhibition by Eugene Ivanov, EE Fine Art, Cambridge, United Kingdom
- 2009. EE Fine Art gallery, January Sale, "Keeping it Small", Cambridge, United Kingdom
- 2009. Solo exhibition, ATRAX Gallery, Přerov, Czech Republic
- 2008. The Christmas exhibition (with Julius Cincar and Moarch Eveno), Ostrožská Nová Ves, Czech Republic
- 2005. The Christmas exhibition (with Moarch Eveno and Adolf Born), Ostrožská Nová Ves, Czech Republic
- 2003. Solo Exhibition, Russian Centre Of Science And Culture, Prague, Czech Republic
- 2002. Solo Exhibition, "Spolek Mlejn", Ostrava, Czech Republic
- 1993. Group Exhibition 1/2 (with Sergey Shapoval). ONMO Kultura Gallery, Tyumen, Russia
- 1991. Group exhibition. Exhibition hall of the association of painters (Tyumen artists union), Tyumen, Russia
- 1991. Solo exhibition No.9, Most Gallery, Palace of culture of oil workers, Tyumen, Russia

== Awards ==
- 2007. The winner of the competition. 2nd Annual International String Art Competition. United States
- 2006. The winner of the competition. 1st Annual International String Art Competition. United States
- 2001. The winner of the competition. Contest of the Illustrations for poems. Belgian publishing house "Wallonie-Bruxelles". Prague, Czech Republic

== Book illustrations by Eugene Ivanov ==
- 2021. K.A. Griffin "The Accidental World" (Independently published, 2021). ISBN 979-8729313617.
- 2020. M. A. Lukatsky "Pedagogy in search of itself" (Maska, 2020). ISBN 978-5-6044406-6-7.
- 2019. Bohumil Hrabal "Pábitelé / Palaverers" (Městská knihovna v Praze, 2019). ISBN 978-80-274-0094-2.
- 2019. Franta Sauer "Franta Habán ze Žižkova. Obrázky z doby popřevratové" (Městská knihovna v Praze, 2019). ISBN 9788076024168.
- 2019. Fyodor Dostoevsky "Povídky / Stories" (Městská knihovna v Praze, 2019). ISBN 9788076024670.
- 2019. Mikhail Bulgakov "Divadelní román / Theatrical Novel" (Městská knihovna v Praze, 2019). ISBN 978-80-7602-767-1.
- 2019. Ahmet Avcı "Kirli Rüyalar Şehri / City Of Dirty Dreams" (Dorlion Yayınları, 2019). ISBN 9786052493724.
- 2019. Jiří Wilson Němec "Kind stories". (Komfi, 2019).
- 2018. Franta Sauer "Pašeráci" (Městská knihovna v Praze, 2018). ISBN 978-80-7602-322-2.
- 2018. Lewan Berdsenischwili "Heiliges Dunkel". (Mitteldeutscher Verlag, 2018). ISBN 9783954629916.
- 2018. Christine Sterkens "Daar is het circus!". (Nik-nak, 2018). ISBN 9789492410306.
- 2018. O. Henry "The Four Million". (T8Rugram, 2018). ISBN 9785521061587.
- 2018. Franz Kafka "Das Schloss". (T8Rugram, 2018). ISBN 9785521061525.
- 2018. Emile Zola "Au Bonheur Des Dames". (T8Rugram, 2018). ISBN 9785521059416.
- 2018. Miguel de Cervantes "El ingenioso hidalgo Don Quijote de la Mancha". (T8Rugram, 2018). ISBN 9785521062591.
- 2018. Alfred de Musset "La confession d'un enfant du siecle". (T8Rugram, 2018). ISBN 9785521060375.
- 2017. Franz Kafka "Das Urteil und Die Verwandlung". (T8Rugram, 2017). ISBN 9785521053445.
- 2017. William Shakespeare "Othello". (T8Rugram, 2017). ISBN 9785521051410.
- 2017. Edgar Allan Poe "Eureka&The Unparalleled Adventure of One Hans Pfaall". (T8Rugram, 2017). ISBN 9785521058051.
- 2017. Joseph Conrad "A Set of Six". (T8Rugram, 2017). ISBN 9785521051595.
- 2017. Ilf I., Petrov E. "Bright personality". (T8Rugram, 2017). ISBN 9785521053001.
- 2017. Ilf I., Petrov E. "Strong sense". (T8Rugram, 2017). ISBN 9785521053032.
- 2017. Robert Louis Stevenson "Strange Case of Dr. Jekyll and Mr. Hyde". (T8Rugram, 2017). ISBN 9785521051526.
- 2017. Arkady Averchenko "Humor for fools". (T8Rugram, 2017). ISBN 9785521052806.
- 2017. Avraham Bar-Av "Moroccan Pushkin". (Hakibbutz Hameuchad, 2017).
- 2017. Antoine de Saint-Exupéry "The Wisdom of the Sands". (Dedalus Kitap, 2017). ISBN 9786059203371.
- 2017. Otakar Hromadko "How the water was tempered". (Epocha, 2017). ISBN 978-80-7557-092-5.
- 2017. Jolanta Darczewska, Piotr Żochowski "ACTIVE MEASURES. Russia’s key export". (OSW, 2017). ISBN 978-83-65827-03-6.
- 2017. Sedat Bayraklı, Davut Bayraklı "The Book Of Curiosities". (Gençokur, 2017). ISBN 978-605-159-386-9.
- 2017. Bülent Şenocak "Kan İftirası / Blood libel". (Dedalus Kitap, 2017). ISBN 9786053112440.
- 2017. Mikhail Bulgakov "Black Snow". (Garamond, 2017). ISBN 978-80-7407-348-9.
- 2017. Antoine de Saint-Exupéry "Kale / The Wisdom of the Sands". (Dedalus Kitap, 2017). ISBN 9786059203371.
- 2017. Nikolai Gogol "Bir Delinin Hatıra Defteri / Diary of a Madman". (Panama Yayıncılık, 2017). ISBN 9789752444522.
- 2017. Güray Süngü "İnsanın Acayip Kısa Tarihi / A Brief History of Odd People". (Dedalus Kitap, 2017). ISBN 9786059203296.
- 2017. Andrey Filimonov "Tadpole and the Saints". (Ripol Classic, 2017). ISBN 9785386101886.
- 2017. Boryszewski Apoloniusz Aleksander "Człowiek Wyprostowany / Upright Man". (Sowello, 2017). ISBN 9788365783080.
- 2017. Zofia Mikuła "Don't chase me Alafufu". (Mamiko, 2017). ISBN 9788365795038.
- 2017. Conjunctions:68 "Inside Out: Architectures of Experience" (Bard College, 2017). ISBN 9780941964845.
- 2017. Irena Glotova "Kludgelogy". (Ridero, 2017). ISBN 9785448513992.
- 2017. S. An-sky "Pioneers The First Breach ". (Syracuse University Press, 2017). ISBN 9780815610847.
- 2017. Johann Wolfgang Goethe "Faust". (T8Rugram, 2017). ISBN 9785521057542.
- 2017. Dmitry Merezhkovsky "The Kingdom of Antichrist". (T8Rugram, 2017). ISBN 9785521052967.
- 2017. Tomasz Drabas, Denny Lee "Learning PySpark". (Acorn, 2017). ISBN 9791161750705.
- 2017. Julian Hillebrand, Maximilian H. Nierhof "Mastering RStudio". (Acorn, 2017). ISBN 9791161750699.
- 2017. Domenico Vecchioni "20 destini straordinari del XX secolo". (Greco e Greco, 2017). EAN 9788879807500.
- 2017. 吕旺·奥吉安 "伦理学反教材". (南海出版公司, 2017). ISBN 9787544286695.
- 2017. Ben Pastor "Lumen". (Audible Studios, 2017). ASIN B07314BQRG.
- 2017. Ben Pastor "Kaputt Mundi". (Audible Studios, 2017). ASIN B072ZZHWKJ.
- 2017. Ben Pastor "Luna bugiarda". (Audible Studios, 2017). ASIN B072ZTS8GG.
- 2017. Ben Pastor "Il signore delle cento ossa". (Audible Studios, 2017). ASIN B0747SJ241.
- 2017. D.K.R. Boyd "The Reflecting Man #3". (Wonderdog Press, 2017). ISBN 9781987914016.
- 2017. Peter M Eronson "Bland skägg och släthyade". (Stevali, 2017). ISBN 9789185701858.
- 2017. Mihaela Perciun "Cenușă rece". (Polirom, 2017). ISBN 9789734670178.
- 2017. Γιάννης Μύρτσης "Εντός μου". (Εκδόσεις Πνοή, 2017). ISBN 9786185307196.
- 2017. John R. Thelin "American Higher Education". (Routledge, 2017). ISBN 9781138888142.
- 2017. Donato Caputo "Dimensione vita". (CSA Editrice, 2017). ISBN 9788893540414.
- 2016. Hu Xiong, Zhen Qin "Introduction to Certificateless Cryptography". (CRC Press, 2016). ISBN 9781482248609.
- 2016. David Hopkins "Dada and Surrealism". (Hindawi, 2016)
- 2016. Diana Catt, Brenda Robertson Stewart "Fine Art of Murder". (Blue River Press, 2016). ISBN 9781681570235.
- 2016. Gary Johns, Alan M. Saks "Organizational Behaviour". (Pearson Canada, 2016). ISBN 9780133951622.
- 2016. Peter M Eronson "För att inte tala om döden". (Stevali, 2016). ISBN 9789185701445.
- 2016. Son Cengiz Aydın "Fakat İyi Aldandık". (Olimpos, 2017). ISBN 9786052063194.
- 2016. Henri Bergson "Etik ve Politika Dersleri". (Pinhan Yayıncılık, 2016). ISBN 9786055302740.
- 2016. Alistair Cole, Renaud Payre "Cities as Political Objects". (Edward Elgar Publishing, 2016). ISBN 9781784719890.
- 2016. Durali Yılmaz "Donuklar". (Yediveren Yayınları, 2016). ISBN 9786059780957.
- 2016. Megan Rohrer "Never Again". (Lulu.com, 2016). ISBN 9781329948075.
- 2016. Stefan Zweig "Frica. Scrisoare de la o necunoscută". (Polirom, 2016). ISBN 9789734621989.
- 2016. Anna Maria Sdraffa "L' Agamennone". (0111edizioni, 2016). EAN 9788893700658.
- 2016. Gordon Bridger "The Message of Obadiah, Nahum and Zephaniah". (校園書房, 2016). ISBN 9789861985190.
- 2016. Gustave Flaubert "LBouvard und Pécuchet". (Kindle Edition, 2016). ISBN 9783944561486.
- 2016. Leopoldo Gasbarro "Un violino per papa Francesco". (Paoline Editoriale Libri, 2016). ISBN 8831547941, ISBN 9788831547949.
- 2016. Francis Scott Fitzgerald "The Curious Case of Benjamin Button". (CreateSpace, 2016). ISBN 9781537205311.
- 2016. Peter Cowlam "New King Palmers". (CentreHouse Press, 2016). ISBN 9781902086132.
- 2016. Manfred Steinbach "Neues vom Sender Eriwan". (Vopelius Jena, 2016). ISBN 9783939718963.
- 2016. Luigi Gussago "Picaresque Fiction Today". (Lam edition, 2016). ISBN 9789004311220.
- 2016. Elena Kasyan "Fragile". (Ahill, 2016). ISBN 9789663570310.
- 2015. Maroussia Klimova "Trampled the flowers of evil". (Ast, 2015). ISBN 9785170872640.
- 2015. Marianna Goncharova "Etudes for the left hand". (Azbuka, 2015). ISBN 9785389109131.
- 2015. Marianna Goncharova "Unlicensed bus and other funny stories". (Azbuka, 2015). ISBN 9785389096189.
- 2015. Yury Buida "The Prussian Bride". (Eksmo, 2015). ISBN 9785699768431.
- 2015. Franz Kafka "The Castle". (Ast, 2015). ISBN 9785170876105.
- 2015. Toygar Barut "Madanayuyu". (Destek Yayinlari, 2015). ISBN 9786053110231.
- 2015. Victor Hugo "Sefiller / Les Miserables". (Panama Yayıncılık, 2015). ISBN 9786054401079.
- 2015. Yury Buida "Woman in Yellow". (Eksmo, 2015). ISBN 9785699792399.
- 2015. Nina Sadur "The Marvellous Old Woman". (Ast, 2015). ISBN 9785170893843.
- 2015. Edvard Radzinsky "But does love exist?" – ask the firemen". (Ast, 2014). ISBN 9785170945054.
- 2015. Gustav Meyrink "Golem". (Eksmo, 2015). ISBN 9785699774173.
- 2015. Robert Louis Stevenson "The Suicide Club". (Garamond, 2015). ISBN 978-80-7407-230-7.
- 2015. Hakan Şenocak "Karanfilsiz". (Dedalus Kitap, 2015). ISBN 9786054708697.
- 2015. Spiro György "1956 ve Küçük Adam / The little man in 1956". (Dedalus Kitap, 2015). ISBN 9786054708604.
- 2015. Greenstone Lobo "What is Your True Zodiac Sign?". (Celestial Books, 2015). ISBN 9789381836729.
- 2015. Stephanie McKendry "Critical Thinking Skills for Healthcare". (Routledge, 2015). ISBN 9781138787520.
- 2015. Alberto Manguel "A Reading Diary". (Dar al Saqi, 2015). ISBN 9786144258231.
- 2015. Ömer Naci Soykan "Estetik ve Sanat Felsefesi". (Pinhan Yayıncılık, 2015). ISBN 9786055302566.
- 2015. Henri Bergson "Metafizik Dersleri". (Pinhan Yayıncılık, 2015). ISBN 9786055302504.
- 2015. Ioan Stanomir "Sfinxul rus". (Adenium, 2015). ISBN 9786067421378.
- 2015. Yusef Komunyakaa "Neon Vernacular". (Valparaíso Ediciones, 2015). ISBN 9788416560301.
- 2015. 오카다 다카시 "나는 왜 혼자가 편할까?". (동양북스, 2015). ISBN 9791157030651.
- 2015. D.K.R. Boyd "The Reflecting Man #2". (Wonderdog Press, 2015). ISBN 9780992017491.
- 2015. David Grossman "Un cal intra intr-un bar". (Polirom, 2015). ISBN 9789734655281.
- 2015. Sarah Porter "To Mooc or Not to Mooc". (Chandos Publishing, 2015). ISBN 9780081000489.
- 2014. Roberto Arlt "Cei 7 nebuni". (Strada Fictiunii, 2014). ISBN 9789737244680.
- 2014. Andrew Nicoll "A fost odată ca niciodată/The good mayor". (Strada Fictiunii, 2014). ISBN 9789737247551.
- 2014. Matei Brunul "Lucian Dan Teodorovici". (Polirom, 2014). ISBN 9789734641802.
- 2014. Yohanan Petrovsky-Shtern "Sztetl". (Wydawnictwa Uniwersytetu Jagiellońskiego, 2014). ISBN 9788323337812.
- 2014. Luigi Pirandello "Mondo di carta e altre novelle". (Faligi Editore, 2014). ISBN 9788857426266.
- 2014. Johann Wolfgang Goethe "La vocazione teatrale di Wilhelm Meister". (Faligi Editore, 2014). ISBN 9788857421018.
- 2014. Fyodor Dostoevsky "Povera Gente". (Faligi Editore, 2014). ISBN 9788857425030.
- 2014. Jules Renard "Storie naturali 1". (Faligi Editore, 2014). ISBN 9788857421421.
- 2014. Jules Renard "Storie naturali 2". (Faligi Editore, 2014). ISBN 9788857421353.
- 2014. Ioan Slavici "Fiabe". (Faligi Editore, 2014). ISBN 9788857422404.
- 2014. Luigi Pirandello "Il buon cuore e altre novelle". (Faligi Editore, 2014). ISBN 9788857426235.
- 2014. Alexandros Papadiamantis "Jito Jabbo". (Faligi Editore, 2014). ISBN 9788857423197.
- 2014. Franz Grillparzer "Il Povero musicante". (Faligi Editore, 2014). ISBN 9788857425276.
- 2014. Franz Grillparzer "Il convento di Sendomir". (Faligi Editore, 2014). ISBN 9788857425269.
- 2014. Charles Dickens "Il Lampinario". (Faligi Editore, 2014). ISBN 9788857425139.
- 2014. Jose Azorin "Le confessioni di un piccolo filosofo". (Faligi Editore, 2014). ISBN 9788857424255.
- 2014. Luigi Pirandello "In silenzio". (Faligi Editore, 2014). ISBN 9788857426259.
- 2014. Charles Dickens "Le Campane". (Faligi Editore, 2014). ISBN 9788857420981.
- 2014. Jack London "Il vagabondo delle stelle". (Faligi Editore, 2014). ISBN 9788857422848.
- 2014. Katherine Mansfield "In una pensione tedesca". (Faligi Editore, 2014). ISBN 9788857423098.
- 2014. Maria-Anna Brucker "Klezmer". (Schell Music, 2014). ISBN 9783864110863.
- 2014. Emilia Pardo Bazan "La Tribuna". (Faligi Editore, 2014). ISBN 9788857420974.
- 2014. Christy Bower "Bible Surveyor Handbook". (CreateSpace, 2014). ISBN 9781495475818.
- 2014. Vivien Miller, James Campbell "Transnational Penal Cultures". (Routledge, 2014). ISBN 9780415741316.
- 2014. Blanka Grzegorczyk "Discourses of Postcolonialism in Contemporary British Children's Literature". (Routledge, 2014). ISBN 9781317962625.
- 2014. Paul J. Nahin "Holy Sci-Fi!". (Springer, 2014). ISBN 9781493906178.
- 2014. Serkan Türk "Bak Önümüzde Yeni Bir Mevsim / Look, the new season before us". (Dedalus Kitap, 2014). ISBN 9786054708734.
- 2014. Emre Ergin "Dördüncü Dilek: La Disparition / The Fourth Wish: The Disappearance". (Dedalus Kitap, 2014). ISBN 9786054708642.
- 2014. Güray Süngü "Köşe Başında Suret Bulan Tek Kişilik Aşk / Around The Corner Found A Single Surrogate Love". (Dedalus Kitap, 2014). ISBN 9786054708772.
- 2014. Jiří Wilson Němec "Rychlebsko's tales 2". (Komfi, 2014). ISBN 9788026071709.
- 2014. Ivan Zorin "The Clown's avatar". (Ripol klassik, 2014). ISBN 9785386079260.
- 2014. Marianna Goncharova "Cat Scriabin". (Azbuka, 2014). ISBN 9785389078031.
- 2014. Harry Gordon "Later. Dark. Far." (Ast, 2014). ISBN 9785170882670.
- 2014. Andrey Ivanov "Bizar". (Ripol klassik, 2014). ISBN 9785386077754.
- 2014. Leonid Filatov "Sons of Bitches". (Ast, 2014). ISBN 9785170853816.
- 2014. Edvard Radzinsky "I stand at restaurant: in marriage - late to die - early". (Ast, 2014). ISBN 9785170847624.
- 2014. Maroussia Klimova "My Anti-History of Russian Literature". (Ast, 2014). ISBN 9785170865895.
- 2014. Drago Jancar "Kehanet". (Dedalus, 2014). ISBN 6054708473, ISBN 9786054708475.
- 2014. Yury Buida "Blue blood". (Eksmo, 2014). ISBN 9785699747108.
- 2014. Marianna Goncharova "Kangaroo in the jacket and other funny stories". (Azbuka, 2014). ISBN 5389077962, ISBN 9785389077966.
- 2014. Yury Buida "Message for My Lady Left Hand". (Eksmo, 2014). ISBN 9785699707997.
- 2014. Pedro Barrento "Marlene and Sofia". (CreateSpace Independent Publishing Platform, 2014). ISBN 1500383090, ISBN 9781500383091.
- 2014. Yury Dombrovsky "The Keeper of Antiquities". (Strada Fictiunii, 2014). ISBN 978-973-724-889-3.
- 2013. Fyodor Dostoyevsky Crime and punishment. (Panama Yayıncılık, 2013). ISBN 9786054401963.
- 2013. Leo Rosten "The Joys of Yiddish". (Leda, 2013). ISBN 9788073353339.
- 2013. Yury Buida "Poison and honey". (Eksmo, 2013). ISBN 9785699695621.
- 2013. Vsevolod Benigsen "Frolov Chakra". (Eksmo, 2013). ISBN 9785699665037.
- 2013. Yury Buida "Ermo". (Eksmo, 2013). ISBN 9785699681679.
- 2013. Yury Buida "Lions and lilies". (Eksmo, 2013). ISBN 9785699660117.
- 2013. Elena Kasyan "Sent dot". (Ahill, 2013). ISBN 9789663570211.
- 2013. Yury Buida "Zhungli". (Eksmo, 2013). ISBN 9785699647002.
- 2013. Jean-François Beauchemin "The Day Crows". (Québec Amérique, 2013). ISBN 9782764422526.
- 2013. Orhan Tez "Söyleş Benimle Dedi Güzel Türkçem". (Cinius, 2013). ISBN 9786051276786.
- 2013. Ron Miller "The Radical Theories of Copernicus, Kepler, Galileo, and Newton". (Twenty-First Century Books, 2013). ISBN 9780761358855.
- 2013. Yury Buida "Don Domino". (Eksmo, 2013). ISBN 9785699644599.
- 2013. Marianna Goncharova "The Fourth Ring". (Azbuka, 2013). ISBN 9785389057135.
- 2013. Angela Shteyngart "Don't get used to love". (M. Graphics Publishing, 2013). ISBN 9781934881965.
- 2013. Yury Buida "Thief, spy and murderer". (Eksmo, 2013). ISBN 9785699626076.
- 2013. Rabbi Nachman`s Haggadah. (Miskal-Yedioth Ahronoth Books and Chemed Books, 2013). ISBN 9789655456561.
- 2013. Master Eugene "English listening training diary". (Person, 2013). ISBN 9788960493377.
- 2013. Aluisio Azevedo "O Homem". (Martin Claret, 2013). ISBN 9788572329927.
- 2013. Vilma de Sousa "Língua e Literatura em Foco 1.". (Positivo, 2013). ISBN 9788538567967.
- 2013. Vilma de Sousa "Língua e Literatura em Foco 2". (Positivo, 2013). ISBN 9788538567981.
- 2013. Vilma de Sousa "Língua e Literatura em Foco 3". (Positivo, 2013). ISBN 9788538568001.
- 2013. D.K.R. Boyd "The Reflecting Man #1". (Wonderdog Press, 2013). ISBN 9780992017477.
- 2013. José Martí "Amicizia funesta". (Faligi Editore, 2013). ISBN 9788857419411.
- 2013. Mikhail Bulgakov "La guardia bianca". (Faligi Editore, 2013). ISBN 9788857419367.
- 2013. Oscar Wilde "Il ritratto di Mr. W.H.". (Faligi Editore, 2013). ISBN 9788857419268.
- 2013. Arya Yudistira Syuman "Metafora dalam Cinta". (PT Gramedia Pustaka Utam, 2013). ISBN 9789792297669.
- 2013. Gotthold Ephraim Lessing "Favole e racconti". (Faligi Editore, 2013). ISBN 9788857419459.
- 2012. Thomas W. Collier "History of Jazz Online Course". (Kendall Hunt Publishing Company, 2012). ISBN 9781465208224.
- 2012. Sergio de Regules "La mamá de Kepler". (B DE BOOKS, 2012). ISBN 9786074803440.
- 2012. P. G. Wodehouse "A little bit of someone else's feelings". (Аst, 2012). ISBN 9785271389665.
- 2012. M. Zattoni, G. Gillini "I racconti meravigliosi della Bibbia". (Effatà, 2012). ISBN 9788874026739.
- 2012. Aluisio Azevedo "O Cortico". (Martin Claret, 2012). ISBN 8572323600.
- 2012. P. G. Wodehouse "The Clicking of Cuthber. The Heart of a Goof. Lord Emsworth and Others". (Astrel, 2012). ISBN 9785271416750.
- 2012. Yury Dombrovsky "The Faculty of Useless Knowledge". (Strada Fictiunii, 2012). ISBN 9789737244468.
- 2012. Yury Dombrovsky "The Monkey Comes for his Skull". (Strada Fictiunii, 2012). ISBN 9789737244475.
- 2012. Débora Cristina Santos e Silva, Goiandira Ortiz de Camargo "Look The Poem". (Cânone Editorial, 2012). ISBN 9788580580105.
- 2012. Jean-Philippe Calvin "Kleztet". (Emerson Edition, 2012). ISMN M570407620.
- 2012. Tudor Călin Zarojanu "Mass Media Insider". (Editura Polirom, 2012). ISBN 9789734625925.
- 2012. Stratis Tsirkas "Jerusalem". (Can Yayınları, 2012). ISBN 9789750714252.
- 2012. Daniel Lifschitz "The rabbis, hustlers and beggars". (Wydawnictwo Promic, 2012). ISBN 9788375023503.
- 2012. John Oldale "Doktor Oldales geographisches Lexikon". (Rororo, 2012). ISBN 3499629542, ISBN 9783499629549.
- 2012. Daniel Lifschitz "Laughter in Hebrew from A to Z". (Wydawnictwo Promic, 2012). ISBN 9788375023510.
- 2012. Hayden Thorne "Clouds’ Illusions". (JMS Books LLC, 2012). ISBN 9781611522891.
- 2012. Diane-Gabrielle Tremblay Articuler emploi et famille. (Presses de l'Université du Québec, 2012). ISBN 9782760534827.
- 2012. P. G. Wodehouse Something Fresh. Summer Lightning. Heavy Weather. Uncle Fred in the Springtime. (Astrel, 2012). ISBN 9785271416743.
- 2012. P. G. Wodehouse Full Moon. Uncle Dynamite. Pics Have Wings. Coctail Time. Blandings Castle. (Astrel, 2012). ISBN 9785271389672.
- 2012. John Fletcher, Ben Jonson English Comedy Plays of the Seventeenth and Eighteenth Century. (Kindle Edition, 2012). ASIN B008PGQ172.
- 2012. P. G. Wodehouse The Little Nugget: Piccadilly Jim: Money for Nothing. (Astrel, 2012). ISBN 9785271433047.
- 2012. M. Lavrentyev Visions of the earth. (Literaturnaya Rossiya, 2012). ISBN 9785780901594.
- 2011. European integration. Edited by O. Butorina. (Business literature, 2011). ISBN 9785932110492.
- 2011. Mohammed Hasan Alwan "The Beaver". (Saqi Books, Beirut, 2011). ISBN 9781855168367.
- 2011. David Allen The Sophisticated Alcoholic. (John Hunt, 2011). ISBN 9781846945229.
- 2011. The book by Rabbi Adin Steinsaltz Six stories of Rabbi Nachman of Bratzlav. (Devir, 2011). ISBN 9789655179675
- 2011. P. G. Wodehouse Ukride and other story. (Astrel, 2011). ISBN 9785170575459.
- 2011. Zdeněk K. Slabý "Scary tales". (Portal, 2011). ISBN 9788073679781.
- 2011. Cori Pursell "The Night Pilgrimage". (Lulu, 2011). ISBN 9781105022975.
- 2011. Izumi Utamaro "One day I died". (Yedam, 2011). ISBN 9788959136490.
- 2011. James Joyce "A portrait of the artist as a young man". (Feel the book, 2011).
- 2011. Leo Tolstoy "Insan Ne ile Yasar / What Men Live By". (Panama Yayıncılık, 2011). ISBN 9786054401192.
- 2011. Igor Guberman "All "Gariks". (Zakharov Books, 2011). ISBN 9785904577117.
- 2011. Léo Dex, M. Dibos "Viaggio e avventure di un aerostato attraverso il Madagascar insorto". (Faligi Editore, 2011). ISBN 9788857416045.
- 2011. Brian M. Stableford "The Quintessence of August". (Borgo Press, 2011). ISBN 9781434412225.
- 2011. Joel Chandler Harris "Il piccolo Sig.Dito De Ditale e il suo stravagante paese". (Faligi Editore, 2011). ISBN 9788857419572.
- 2011. Elettra Groppo "Al di là del fiume". (Faligi Editore, 2011). ISBN 9788857417448.
- 2011. Cyrus Townsend Brady "Un piccolo libro per il Natale". (Faligi Editore, 2011). ISBN 9788857416298.
- 2010. Giorgio Borra "La stanza del tenente". (0111edizioni, 2010). ISBN 9788863072853.
- 2010. DC Erickson. No One Laughs at a Dead Clown. (CreateSpace Independent Publishing Platform, 2010). ISBN 9781450556194, ISBN 1450556191.
- 2010. Randall Garrett "Despoilers of the Golden Empire". (Wildside Press, 2010). ISBN 1434410056, ISBN 9781434410054.
- 2010. Arthur Phillips "Prague". (Modern Times S.A., Athens, 2010). ISBN 9789606916663.
- 2010. Huseyin Tunc "Now what are we actually". (Nesil, 2010).
- 2010. Vladimir Dobrushkin "Mathematics of Social Choice and Finance". (Kendall Hunt, 2010). ISBN 9780757578007.
- 2010. Sendecka Zyta, Szedzianis Elzbieta "The Books seria Vademecum of High school examination". (Operon, 2010). ISBN 9788376801926
- 2010. Autori Vari "Bookland 2010". (MyBook, 2010). ISBN 9788896096635.
- 2010. W. Somerset Maugham "The Hero". (WLC, 2010). ISBN 1557420572.
- 2010. The book series by P. G. Wodehouse. (Astrel, 2012).
- 2010. The poetry book "Poetica Magazine". (Poetica, 2010). ISSN 1541-1923.
- 2010. Ed Galing "Pushcarts and Peddlers". (Poetica, 2010).
- 2010. Lyubov and Yevgeny Lukins "Until the Time Ends". (PrinTerra-Dizajn, 2010). ISBN 9785984241199.
- 2010. Elena Kasjan "Poste Restante". (Ahill, 2010). ISBN 978-966-357-021-1.
- 2009. Dorothy L. Sayers "Whose Body?". (Wildside Press, 2009). ISBN 9781434404039.
- 2009. Horatio Alger "Struggling Upward". (Wildside Press, 2009). ISBN 9781434458490.
- 2009. Gotthold Ephraim Lessing "Nathan the Wise: A Dramatic Play in Five Acts". (Classic Drama Book Company, 2009). ISBN 9781557427656, ISBN 1557427658.
- 2009. Agatha Christie "Einzige ungekürzte lesung". (Hörbuchproduktionen, 2009). ISBN 9783896144027.
- 2009. Jiří Kratochvíl "The immortal story". (Mozaik knjiga, 2009). ISBN 9789531404778.
- 2009. Rabbi Dov Peretz Elkins "Jewish Guided Imagery". (A.R.E. Press, 2009). ISBN 9780867052015.
- 2008. Yevgenia Ginzburg "Journey into the Whirlwind". (Astrel, 2008). ISBN 9785170468157., ISBN 9785271180736.
- 2008. Elisabeth Kübler-Ross "The wheell of life: A memoir of living and dying ". (BM Books, Golden Owl, 2008). ISBN 9788960301665.
- 2007. Daniele D'Alberto "Pensieri di Scribacchino". (Caravaggio Editore, 2007). ISBN 9788895437064.
- 2004. The children book "Murbi ja Paliina". (Hea Algus, 2004). ISBN 9789949139569.
- 2000. The children colouring book. (Pierot, 2000).
