= Sakharov Prize (disambiguation) =

The Sakharov Prize for Freedom of Thought is an award for the defense of human rights and freedom of thought established in 1988 by the European Parliament.

Sakharov Prize may also refer to:

- Andrei Sakharov Prize (APS), a prize awarded every second year by the American Physical Society since 2006
- Andrei Sakharov Freedom Award, an award established in 1980 by the Norwegian Helsinki Committee
- Andrei Sakharov Prize for Writer's Civic Courage, an annual literary prize existing between 1990 and 2007
