= Eugene Ivanov =

Eugene Ivanov may refer to:

- Yevgeny Ivanov (spy) (1926–1994), Soviet naval attaché and spy
- Eugene Ivanov (artist) (born 1966), Russian-Czech artist
