= Filimonov (surname) =

Filimonov (Russian: Филимонов; masculine) or Filimonova (Russian: Филимонова; feminine) is a Russian surname, and means literally Philemon's. It is shared by the following people:

- Aleksandr Filimonov (born 1973), Russian association football player
- Alexander Filimonov (Cossack) (1866–1948), Russian Cossack
- Andrei Filimonov (born 1985), Russian association football player
- Dmitri Filimonov (born 1971), Russian ice hockey player
- Gennadi Filimonov (born 1962), Russian association football player
- Ljudmila Filimonova (born 1962), Russian speed skater
- Lyudmila Filimonova (born 1971), Belarusian discus thrower
- Sergey Filimonov (born 1975), Kazakhstani weightlifter
- Vladimir Filimonov (born 1965), Russian association football player
