= Michael Glenny =

British translator (1927–1990)

- Born: Michael Valentine Guybon Glenny; 26 September 1927; London, England, UK
- Died: 1 August 1990 (aged 62); Moscow, Soviet Union
- Resting place: Paston, Norfolk, England, UK
- Education: Christ Church, Oxford
- Occupations: translator, author
- Spouse(s): 1. Juliet Mary Crum (1952-1972; dissolved); 2. Valery Hartley-Brewer
- Children: 4
- Relatives: Misha Glenny (son)
- Writing career
- Language: English, Russian, German
- Genre: Russian literature

The majority of material in this article has been sourced from the Dictionary of National Biography.

Michael Valentine Guybon Glenny (26 September 1927, London – 1 August 1990, Moscow) was a British lecturer in Russian studies and a translator of Russian literature into English.

== Life ==
Glenny was born on 26 September 1927 in London, the only child of Arthur Glenny, an RAF officer, and Avice Noel (née Boyes), a South African ambulance driver in the Second World War. After preparatory school in Suffolk, he went to Radley College and Christ Church, Oxford. He obtained a second-class degree in Russian and French, graduating in 1951.

During his stint with the military under National Service, he pursued postgraduate Soviet studies at Oxford University.

== Career ==
=== Military ===
Following his undergraduate studies, Glenny joined the Royal Horse Guards for his national service. Ranked captain, he was posted to West Berlin in 1951. He considered a career in the military as well as in intelligence, but these did not come to fruition. He was discharged from the army in 1954 and came back to London. Glenny began his career in insurance. He then joined the Wedgwood company as a salesman and export manager. When the Wedgwood Room in the royal palace at Tsarskoye Selo was being restored in the 1960s, he was invited to the Soviet Union as an adviser.

=== Journalism ===
In 1964 Glenny joined The Observer in London to manage advertising and special projects. In 1966, the newspaper organised the Masada Exhibition at the Royal Festival Hall; he was the manager in charge of it.

=== Academic ===
Glenny was a lecturer in Russian language, literature and history at Birmingham University from 1972 to 1975. Between 1975 and 1977, he was a visiting lecturer at the Southern Illinois University, where he collaborated with Herbert Marshall on the translation of Sergei Eisenstein's writings on drama theory. He worked at Bristol University from 1977 to 1984.

=== Literary ===
Glenny began working as a part-time translator during his stint with Wedgwood. Via the publisher George Weidenfeld, his first published translations were from German. However translations from Russian became the main focus of his life. Indeed, his speciality was the discovery and transmission of contemporary Russian literature that was unavailable to an English readership. His translation of Mikhail Bulgakov's The Master and Margarita in 1967 established his fame. He followed up with several other Bulgakov novels.

Glenny made several trips to the Soviet Union in his search for significant works for translation. An early work by Alexander Solzhenitsyn, The First Circle, came out in translation in 1968 by Michael Guybon; it was later revealed that this was the pen name of a trio of translators: Glenny, Max Hayward and Manya Harari. His translation of Yuri Trifonov's The House on the Embankment was well received.

He was instrumental in bringing to public attention the works of Russian émigré and exiled writers such as Georgy Vladimov, Zinovy Zinik and Vasily Aksyonov. Glenny co-authored, with Norman Stone, an oral history of the experiences of Russian emigres, titled The Other Russia, for which he also conducted many of the interviews. One of his most monumental works was the translation of Boris Yeltsin's memoirs, 100,000 words of text, in 1990.

Significant among his interests was theatre. Following the Chernobyl disaster, Vladimir Gubaryev's play Sarcophagus came out in September 1986. Glenny obtained a copy of the script and translated it, and it was staged by the Royal Shakespeare Company at the Barbican Centre in 1987. Glenny's Five Plays from the Soviet Union came out in 1989.

At the time of his death in Moscow in 1990, Glenny was researching the works of Soviet writers who had perished in the gulags, and was awaiting documents from the KGB.

== Death ==
Glenny died on 1 August 1990 in Moscow after suffering a heart attack. He is interred at Paston, near North Walsham, Norfolk.

== Select bibliography ==
=== Drama and theory ===
- Eisenstein, Sergei (1996). Michael Glenny, Richard Taylor (ed.). Selected Works: Writings, 1934–47. British Film Institute. ISBN 978-0-85170-530-9.
- Eisenstein, Sergei (2010). Glenny, Taylor (ed.). Selected Works: Towards a theory of montage. I.B. Tauris. ISBN 978-1-84885-356-0.
- Gorin, Grigorii (1988). Forget Herostratus!. Dramatic Publishing Company.

=== Memoir ===
- Lysenko, Vladil (1986). Crime Against the World: Memoirs of a Russian Sea Captain. Victor Gollancz. ISBN 978-0575031395.
- Yeltsin, Boris (1990). Against the grain: an autobiography. Simon & Schuster. ISBN 978-0671700553.

=== Literature ===
- Yuri Dombrovsky (1968). Khranitel drevnostei [The Keeper of Antiquities]. Translated by Michael Glenny. Longman. ISBN 9780856357701.
- Vladimir Nabokov (1970). Mashenka [Mary]. Translated by Michael Glenny; Vladimir Nabokov. McGraw-Hill. ISBN 9780679726203.
- Georgy Vladimov (1979). Vernyi Ruslan. Istoriia karaul'noi sobaki [Faithful Ruslan. The Story of a Guard Dog]. Translated by Michael Glenny. Simon & Schuster. ISBN 9780671246334.
- Mikhail Bulgakov (1967). The Master and Margarita. Translated by Michael Glenny. Harper & Row. ISBN 9781524704124.
- Mikhail Bulgakov (1979). Dni Turbinykh [The White Guard]. Translated by Michael Glenny. Methuen. ISBN 9781612192147.
- Vladimir Lakshin (1980). Michael Glenny (ed.). Solzhenitsyn, Tvardovsky and "Novy Mir". Translated by Michael Glenny. MIT Press. ISBN 9780262120869.
- Vassily Aksenov (1984). Ozhog [The Burn]. Translated by Michael Glenny. Hutchinson.
- Anatoly Pristavkin (1991). Nochevaia tuchka zolotaia [The Inseparable Twins]. Translated by Michael Glenny. Picador. ISBN 978-0330304436.

== Citations ==
- Cornwell, Neil (2013). Reference Guide to Russian Literature. Routledge. ISBN 978-1-134-26070-6.
