= Alan Myers (translator) =

Alan Myers (18 August 1933 – 8 August 2010), a Briton, was a noted translator, most notably of works by Russian authors.

== Biography ==
Myers was born in South Shields, County Durham, in 1933. He attended the University of London between 1957 and 1960 and Moscow University from 1960 to 1961. Subsequently, he taught Russian and English in Hertfordshire 1963–86.

During this period, he published reviews, translations and educational articles, and in summer worked as a travel courier on Russian Baltic liners, and as interpreter for the British Council in Britain and the USSR. He has broadcast on BBC Radio 3 and the BBC World Service on Russian themes. He retired in 1986 to work as a freelance literary translator.

== Work ==
=== Poetry ===
Robert Conquest has stated that translating rhymed poetry into English rhymed poetry is the most difficult of all arts. Myers took on the challenge and produced mimetic rhymed versions of 19th century Russian poetry (such as An Age Ago published by Penguin Books in 1989) extracts from which appear in the Oxford Dictionary of Quotations. He has written of his approach to poetry translation in The Sunday Times (23.4.89).

=== Prose ===
In prose, major translations include works by Valentin Rasputin, Vasil Bykaŭ, Yury Dombrovsky, Dostoevsky's The Idiot in 1992 and his A Gentle Creature and Other Stories in 1995 both of which were published by Oxford University Press as was Pushkin's Queen of Spades and Other Stories. The Myers translation of The Idiot has been chosen for publication in the People's Republic of China (in English with notes in Chinese). This translation is described in the Oxford Guide to Translated Literature in English (2000) as the best currently available.

=== Essays ===
Myers translated poems and essays for his friend, Nobel laureate Joseph Brodsky, which appeared in The New York Review of Books, The New Yorker, Vogue, The Times Literary Supplement and later in Brodsky's books: A Part of Speech; Less than One; Urania; So Forth and Collected Poems in English. His extended Brodsky interview appeared in Valentina Polukhina's Joseph Brodsky in the Eyes of his Contemporaries. Brodsky's poetry cycle "In England" is dedicated to Myers and his wife Diana (who both appear in the work). Other Brodsky translations included his only two plays Marbles (published by Penguin Books in 1988) and Democracy! – the latter performed at London's Gate Theatre. Both of the above have received critical praise in the national press.

=== Essays and memoirs ===
Other notable translations included Lydia Ginzburg's Blockade Diary, and Yuri Dombrovsky's epic novel The Faculty of Useless Knowledge. Myers has also translated literary memoirs such as Kruchenykh's Our Arrival, avant-garde art criticism and The Jewish Artistic Heritage by Ansky (RA, 1994).

Myers' translation of the Efros essay and the catalogue for the Ansky world exhibition was described as 'brilliant... executed by one of the finest English literary translators.'

Other works include a docu-novel on the Chernobyl disaster by Julia Voznesenskaya. Stories by Zinovy Zinik including the much anthologised "Hooks" appeared in The New Yorker and elsewhere, while mimetic rhymed versions of Irina Ratushinskaya have been broadcast on BBC Radio 3 and published by Bloodaxe Books.

In addition, Myers has translated a wide range of modern Russian novels and stories, including thrillers and science fiction – Edward Topol's Red Gas (translated into Braille), Friedrich Neznansky's Operation Faust; the Strugatsky brothers' Snail on the Slope and Far Rainbow. The Bronze Snail is a Russian science fiction award named after the former complex work.

The Myers Collection of Russian speculative fiction, the most extensive in the country, is held at the University of Liverpool, along with his history of the genre.

Myers has also published research articles in The Slavonic and East European Review (1990–93) and elsewhere on Yevgeny Zamyatin's life and writings in Newcastle 1916–17. This extensive original research has demonstrated the crucial influence of the author's Tyneside sojourn on his masterpiece We (a strong influence on Orwell's Nineteen Eighty-Four). Myers took part in a BBC Radio 3 documentary on Zamyatin in December 2003.

His last translations appeared in Utopias (Penguin Books, 1999), a survey of Russian modernism. These include his versions of Mandelstam, Akhmatova, Kharms, Vaginov and Zamyatin.

== Other work ==
Myers was contributing associate editor of Northern Review in Newcastle for many years and author of the comprehensive Myers' Literary Guide: The North East (1995, 1997) (Carcanet/MidNag). This, and much other North East data can be found on his website.

He was co-author, with Robert Forsythe of W. H. Auden: Pennine Poet (North Pennines Heritage Trust, 1999). It contains considerable original research on the landscape and industrial remains of the North Pennine hills – the poet's "Mutterland" – a region which strongly influenced Auden as a boy and which remained a recurrent source of reference throughout his life. Myers may be said to have helped establish this theme in the mainstream of Auden criticism.

He was also a contributor to the Oxford Companion to English Literature and the Dictionary of National Biography (2004) for which he wrote the entry on Orwell's friend Jack Common.
