= Filimonov =

Filimonov (Russian: Филимонов) can refer to:

- Filimonov: a Russian surname
- Filimonov toy: a ceramic craft from the Tula region of Russian
