= Ewan Hooper =

Scottish actor (1935–2023)

- Born: Ewan Eynon Hooper; 23 October 1935; Dundee, Angus, Scotland
- Died: 6 April 2023 (aged 87)

Ewan Eynon Hooper (23 October 1935 – 6 April 2023) was a Scottish actor who was a graduate from, and later an associate member of RADA.

== Life and career ==
Hooper was the motivating force in the foundation of the Greenwich Theatre, which opened in 1969. Hooper was the founder director of the Scottish Theatre Company formed in Glasgow in the 1980s. He is best remembered as the priest in Dracula Has Risen from the Grave, along with a recurring role as Camp Controller Alec Foster in Jimmy Perry and David Croft's Hi-de-Hi!. He appeared as Sergeant Moran in the 1966 The Avengers episode "What the Butler Saw". He also was Detective Sergeant Smith in 1970s series Hunters Walk.

Hooper was married to an actress. He died on 6 April 2023, at the age of 87.

== Selected filmography ==
- How I Won the War (1967)
- Dracula Has Risen from the Grave (1968)
- Julius Caesar (1970)
- Personal Services (1987)
- Kinky Boots (2005)

== Selected theatre performances ==
- Mr Hardcastle in She Stoops to Conquer by Oliver Goldsmith. Directed by James Maxwell at the Royal Exchange, Manchester. (1990)
- Mr Jeffcote in Hindle Wakes by Stanley Houghton. Directed by Helena Kaut-Howson at the Royal Exchange, Manchester. This was the production in performance at the time of the 1996 Manchester bombing. It was also the production which opened the restored theatre two years later. (1996) and (1998)
- Leonato in Much Ado About Nothing. Directed by Helena Kaut-Howson at the Royal Exchange, Manchester. Hooper won a (MEN Award) for his performance. (1997)
- Rev. Samuel Gardner in Mrs Warren's Profession by George Bernard Shaw. Directed by Helena Kaut-Howson at the Royal Exchange, Manchester. (2000)
- Mr Kirk in Outlying Islands by David Greig. Directed by Loveday Ingram at the Ustinov, Theatre Royal Bath (2006)
- Gonzalo in The Tempest. Directed by Greg Hersov at the Royal Exchange, Manchester. (2007)
