= Yunna Morits =

Russian poet (born 1937)

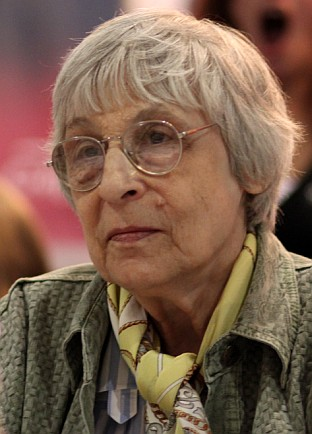
- 2010
- Born: June 2, 1937 (age 89); Kiev, USSR/Ukraine
- Writing career
- Genres: Poetry, short prose, translations
- Notable works: The Cape of Desire, The Vine
- Notable awards: Order of the Badge of Honour (1987); Andrei Sakharov Prize for Writer's Civic Courage (2004); Golden Rose (Italy)
- Literary movement: The Sixtiers
- Website: owl.ru/morits

Yunna Pinhusovna Morits (Moritz) (Russian: Ю́нна Петро́вна Мо́риц; born June 2, 1937), is a Soviet and Russian poet, poetry translator and activist. She was a recipient of the Andrei Sakharov Prize For Writer's Civic Courage and the Golden Rose (Italy).

== Biography ==
She was born in Kiev, USSR (present-day Kyiv, Ukraine) in a Jewish family. Her father Pinchas Moritz, was imprisoned under Stalin. She suffered from tuberculosis in her childhood, and spent years of hardship in Chelyabinsk in the Urals during World War II. In the 1950s, she went to study in Moscow, where she was briefly expelled from college for her poems' critical stance and alienation from the Soviet system. Her poem was a tribute to Titsian Tabidze, a Georgian poet executed by Stalin in 1937. In 1961, she became widely known for her collection about the Far North, The Cape of Desire, based on her 1956 journey aboard the Arctic icebreaker Georgiy Sedov, and she was among the few young poets favored by Anna Akhmatova.

From 1961 to 1970, due to some controversial poems, she was unable to publish. Since the 1960s, she also became known for her poetic translations into Russian from many languages (these translations, commissioned by Soviet publishing houses, often employed an intermediary literal translator and a poet). She rendered into Russian verse such poets as Moisei Toif, Constantine Cavafy, Giorgos Seferis, Umberto Saba, Oscar Wilde and Federico García Lorca.

In later years, she attracted many young readers with her children poetry, some of which, like her adult work, became known to mass audience through songs created by guitar singer-songwriters, especially by Sergey Nikitin. Her other published work includes short stories, op-eds and, most recently, graphics.

She has been founding member of several liberal organizations of artistic intelligentia, including the Russian section of International PEN. She is a member of Russian PEN Executive Committee and its Human Rights Commission. She has been awarded several prestigious prizes, including Andrei Sakharov Prize For Writer's Civic Courage.

== Politics ==
After 2014 Morits became a vocal supporter of the Russian occupation of Donbas and Crimea. Some of her recent poetry conveys anti-Ukrainian and anti-Western sentiments, and her invective at perceived anti-Russian campaign by the West.

== English translations ==
- Post-war Russian Poetry. Ed. with an introd. by Daniel Weissbort. London: Penguin Books, 1974. ISBN 0-14-042183-1.
