= Helena Kaut-Howson =

British theatre director

- Born: Helena Kaut; 1940 (age 85–86); Lviv, Soviet Union
- Occupation: Theatre director

Helena Kaut-Howson (born 1940) is a Polish-born British theatre director.

== Early life and education ==
Helena Kaut-Howson was born (as Helena Kaut) in Lviv, a Polish city which was recently forcibly incorporated into Soviet Union. She is a child Holocaust survivor. She grew up in Wrocław, Poland. Her training as a director was first at the Polish State Theatre School and then at the Royal Academy of Dramatic Art.

== Career ==
Kaut-Howson originally worked as an actor in the 1950s, at the Jewish Theatre, Warsaw. She had to leave Poland after marrying a British man who was the son of an admiral working for NATO, and came to the United Kingdom then. She worked in the 1960s in direction at the Royal Court Theatre. She has directed in Israel at the Jerusalem Community Theatre, the Habima Theatre and Cameri Theater. Other work as director outside the UK includes at Monument-National in Canada and the Gate Theatre in Dublin. She has also worked with Scena Polska UK at the Polish Social and Cultural Association in London.

Kaut-Howson was artistic director of Theatr Clwyd in Wales between 1992 and 1995. The Board decided not to renew her contract, despite the financial and critical success Clwyd had under her leadership.

There was disagreement between Kaut-Howson and the theatre management about her production of The Miser at the Royal Exchange, Manchester in 2009.

Kaut-Howson has taught at the Royal Academy of Dramatic Art (RADA) and at the London Academy of Music and Dramatic Art.

Some of the plays she has directed are her own adaptations. This includes Faithful Ruslan, which she adapted from the book by Georgi Vladimov.

== Themes ==
Although Kaut-Howson does not call herself a feminist, her productions are often identified as feminist. In her production of King Lear at the Leicester Haymarket Theatre, later transferring to the Young Vic, the part of King Lear was played by a woman, Kathryn Hunter, a decision which was called "controversial".

Kaut-Howson values working with actors from the theatre company Complicité. She believes that theatre is about a company performing, rather than individual actors.

Kaut-Howson was instrumental in bringing the work of Bruno Schulz to the stage.

== Awards ==
- Peter Brook Open Space Award 1994 for Outstanding Body of Work at Theatr Clwyd
- Liverpool Post and Echo Arts Award 1992 for Best Director (The Devils)
- UK Theatre Awards Regional Theatre Awards 1995 for Best Director (The Rose Tattoo)
- Contact International Festival, Torun 1994 Critics Award (Full Moon)
- Manchester Evening News Award 1996 for Best Production (The Hindle Wakes)
- Manchester Evening News Awards 1997 for Best Production (Much Ado About Nothing)
- Polish Festival of Premieres, Bydgoszcz 2004: Grand Prix for Best Director (Victory)

== Bibliography ==
- Werewolves, translation from Teresa Lubkiewicz-Urbanowicz, Plays and Players, 1978
- Grave Acts, Dialog, 1981
- Tola Korian, Pamietnik Teatralny, 1986
- Full Moon, Plays International, 1993
- "Flowers Among the Ruins - Identity and the Theatre", in Views of Theatre in Ireland 1995, The Arts Council, 1995
- Victory (translation into Polish), Dialog, 2004
- Remembering Pinter, Dialog, 2010
- Sons Without Fathers, from Chekhov's Platonov, Oberon Books, 2013

From 2017, Kaut-Howson wrote a column in Tydzień Polski, called "Notes from the wings".
