= Sofia Petrovna =

1965 novella by Lydia Chukovskaya

- Author: Lydia Chukovskaya
- Translator: Aline Werth (1988), Olga Kagan & Mara Kashper (2002)
- Language: Russian
- Genre: Literary fiction
- Publisher: Northwestern University Press, Focus Publishing/R. Pullins Company
- Publication date: 1965 (Russian), 1967 (English)
- Publication place: U.S.S.R.
- Media type: Print (Hardback & Paperback)
- Pages: 120 pp (1988 edition), 161 pp (2002 edition)
- ISBN: 0-8101-0794-5 (1988 paperback edition)
- OCLC: 18520405

Sofia Petrovna is a novella by Russian author Lydia Chukovskaya, written in the late 1930s in the Soviet Union. It is notable as one of the few surviving accounts of the Great Purge actually written during the purge era.

== Synopsis ==
Sofia Petrovna, a typist in the Soviet Union in 1937 is proud of the achievements of her son Nikolai (Kolya). Kolya, an engineering student and strong Communist, is at the beginning of a promising career, with his picture featured on the cover of Pravda. Before long, however, the Great Purge begins and Sofia's coworkers begin vanishing, amid accusations of treachery. Soon, Kolya's best friend Alik reports that Kolya has been arrested. Sofia and her friend and fellow typist Natasha try to find out more but are drowned in a sea of bureaucrats and long lines. More people vanish, and Sofia spends ever more time in lines at government buildings. Natasha makes a typographical error that is mistaken for a criticism of the Red Army and she is fired. When Sofia defends her, she is criticized and soon forced out as well. Alik is questioned, and when he does not renounce Kolya, he, too, is arrested and vanishes. Natasha and Sofia both lose their will to live. Natasha commits suicide via poison, and Sofia immerses herself in a fantasy of Kolya's return. When she finally gets a letter from Kolya, in which he reaffirms his innocence and tells more of his own story, Sofia tries to fight for his freedom again, but realizes that, in this bizarre, chaotic place, she will likely only place more suspicion on herself and Kolya. Out of desperation, she burns the letter.

== History ==
Based on her experiences during the Great Purge of 1938-39, it was written in 1939-40 but remained unpublished due to the critical and honest nature of the piece. Originally written in a school exercise book, it was hidden, as its discovery could have endangered Chukovskaya. With the death of Joseph Stalin in 1953, and his subsequent denunciation by Nikita Khrushchev, Chukovskaya reexamined the work, edited out a no-longer-relevant introduction, and sought publication in 1962. The book was nearly published in 1963, but was pulled before it could be released due to a changing political climate. It finally saw release in France in 1965 in Russian but with a changed title ("The Deserted House") and different character names. It was then published in the United States, in Russian, with the correct title, in Novy Zhurnal. However, the book was not published in Chukovskaya's native country, and she forbade publication of any other work until after the release in Russia of Sofia Petrovna. The book was not published in the Soviet Union until 1988 amidst Glasnost.
