= Elena Rzhevskaya =

Soviet war interpreter who safeguarded Hitler's remains

- Елена Моисеевна Ржевская
- Born: Elena Kagan; 27 October 1919; Gomel, Belarus SSR, Soviet Union (Present-day Gomel, Belarus)
- Died: 25 April 2017 (aged 97); Moscow, Russia
- Education: Moscow State University
- Occupations: Writer, war interpreter
- Awards: Andrei Sakharov Prize for Writer's Civic Courage

Elena Moiseevna Rzhevskaya (Russian: Еле́на Моисе́евна Рже́вская, born Elena Kagan; 27 October 1919 – 25 April 2017) was a writer and former Soviet war interpreter. In April and May, 1945, she participated in the Battle of Berlin. According to her memoirs, called in English Memories of a War-time Interpreter, she was a member of the Soviet unit searching for Adolf Hitler in the ruins of the Reich Chancellery. Hitler's charred remains were, according to her own words, found by soldier Ivan Churakov on 4 May 1945. Four days later, on 8 May, Colonel Vassily Gorbushin gave her a small box that contained Hitler's dental remains. During the identification of the corpse, the Soviet team worked in top-secret conditions. Rzhevskaya and Gorbushin managed to find in Berlin, Käthe Heusermann, an assistant of Hugo Blaschke, Hitler's personal dentist. Heusermann confirmed the identity of the Nazi leader. The information was, however, suppressed by Joseph Stalin, who later ordered the facts not to be publicized. She was a recipient of the Andrei Sakharov Prize for Writer's Civic Courage.

== Biography ==
Elena Kagan was born to a Jewish family in the Belarusian town of Gomel. The family later moved to Moscow. At the time of the Nazi attack on the Soviet Union, she was studying philosophy at Moscow State University. She wanted to join the battlefront, but she was sent to work in a munition factory and later studied to be a nurse. However, her knowledge of German led her to be transferred to a school for war interpreters. In February, 1942, she joined Lelyushenko's troops and in the following months, she moved together with the army throughout Belarus and Poland to the West.

=== Berlin, 1945 ===
From February 1945, Rzhevskaya worked in Poznań. At the end of April 1945, she was transferred to Berlin. Her troop became a part of the Kuznetsov's 3rd Army, responsible for the attack on the Reichstag.

The Soviet troops captured the Reich Chancellery and the subterranean Führerbunker on 2 May. The corpses of Joseph Goebbels and his wife, Magda, were found and identified, and a subsequent report about it was openly publicized. This apparently outraged Stalin, who immediately ordered to keep secret all records related to the search for Adolf Hitler. Contacts with the press and photographers were banned and the information was sent directly to Stalin.

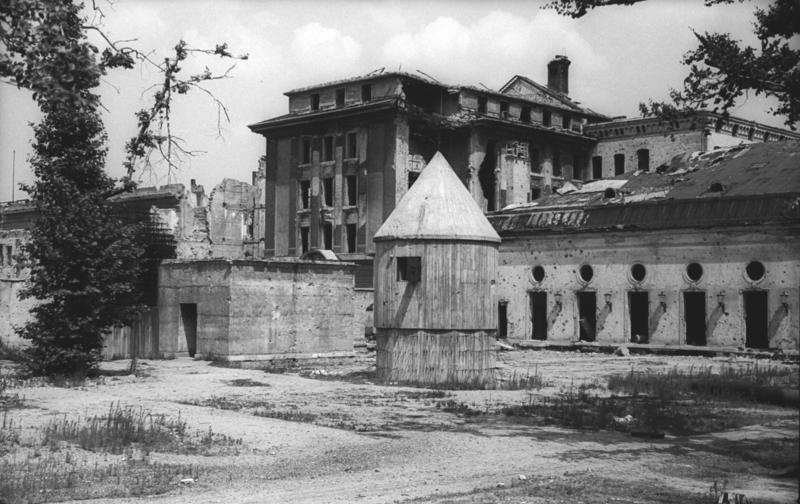
July 1947 photo of the rear entrance to the Führerbunker, in the garden of the Reich Chancellery; Hitler and Eva Braun were cremated in a shell hole in front of the emergency exit at left.

In the following days, a lot of speculation and contradictory facts appeared about the alleged death of Hitler. According to Rzhevskaya, Hitler's corpse was found by accident. Shortly before their departure from Berlin, on 4 May, a group of Soviet soldiers led by SMERSH commander Ivan Klimenko visited the garden of the Chancellery, where the burned corpse of Goebbels had been found on 2 May. According to Rzhevskaya, near the bunker entrance, Soviet Private Ivan Churakov found a shell hole filled with unusually fresh soil. After a brief examination, a charred male and female corpse were found. They re-buried the bodies and left without further investigation, as Klimenko had been confused by an apparent body double of Hitler found on the night of 3 May. This was later debunked as belonging to Hitler and early on 5 May, the Soviets recovered the two corpses and also dug up the bodies of two dogs.

The Soviet 3rd Shock Army moved the corpses to an improvised morgue located in Berlin-Buch. The secret transport took place over the night of 5 and 6 May, allegedly in order to prevent commander of the city Nikolai Berzarin and his 5th Shock Army from claiming a stake in the findings. However, it was Berzarin who commissioned Colonel Vassily Gorbushin, for whom Rzhevskaya served as interpreter, with investigating Hitler's fate. According to Rzhevskaya, the burnt corpses were wrapped in sheets and lifted over the fence of the Chancellery garden and into two large crates (apparently for ammunition) on a Soviet truck early on 6 May. According to Soviet forensic expert Faust Shkaravsky, he received Hitler's remains in such a wooden crate. Hitler's dental remains – said to be found loose in the oral cavity while somehow clamping down on the tongue – were supposedly removed during the alleged autopsy conducted on 8 May. These remains, which are the only remains of Hitler's actually proven to be found, consisted of a golden maxillar bridge and a lower jawbone fragment with teeth and dental work. On 8 May, Gorbushin gave a casket containing the dental remains to Rzhevskaya and told her to keep an eye on it, as she would be less likely than the male officers to get drunk and lose them. According to Rzhevskaya, the casket (sometimes translated as a cigar box) was "second-hand [and dark red] with a soft lining and covered with satin, the kind of thing made to hold a bottle of perfume or cheap jewellery."

On the following day of 9 May, they managed to track down Käthe Heusermann, an assistant of Hugo Blaschke, Hitler's personal dentist. Heusermann led them to the Reich Chancellery, where Hitler's medical records, including X-ray images of his teeth were kept. During the interrogation led by Gorbushin, Major Bystrov, and Rzhevskaya as an interpreter, she confirmed that the box contained Hitler's teeth. The information was subsequently confirmed by Fritz Echtmann, a dental technician who worked in the Blaschke's consulting room since 1938.

However, the Soviets needed a direct testimony of someone who witnessed Hitler's death. Otto Günsche, Hitler's personal adjutant, and Johann Rattenhuber, head of Hitler's RSD bodyguard, were arrested in different sectors, and their testimonies were not available at the time. On 13 May, the Soviet Army arrested Harry Mengershausen, a member of Hitler's personal SS guard. During an interrogation, he confirmed that on 30 April, he witnessed Hitler's valet, Heinz Linge, and Günsche carrying the bodies of Hitler and Eva Braun through the bunker's emergency exit to the garden behind the Reich Chancellery, where they were doused in petrol and set alight. Mengershausen identified the bomb crater where the remains were allegedly later buried.

Despite the attempts at concealment, the information about their findings was noted and published by newspapers of the allied occupation armies. The reaction of the Soviet command was unusual. According to Rzhevskaya, everybody was ordered to search for Hitler. A false investigation started. The Soviet press repeatedly reported that Hitler fled to Argentina or was in hiding under the protection of the Spanish dictator Franco.

== Aftermath ==
In her memoirs, Rzhevskaya writes: "I was absolutely convinced that we, along with all gathered information and key witnesses, will be sent to Moscow". "I was sure that in a few days, the whole world will know that we had found Hitler's corpse". However, Stalin decided otherwise. Viktor Abakumov, the chief of SMERSH, later told Gorbushin that Stalin became familiar with the circumstances of the case and decided not to publicize anything. "We remain in capitalist encirclement," he stated. Rzhevskaya and the other collaborators were told by Gorbushin: "Forget what you just heard".

Käthe Heusermann was deported to the Soviet Union in July, 1945, and after interrogation in Lubyanka and Lefortovo prisons, she was sentenced to ten years imprisonment. According to the decision of the court: "... by her participation in Hitler's dental treatment, she voluntarily helped a bourgeois state prolong the war".

After the war, Rzhevskaya resided in Moscow where she continued her career as a writer. She was allowed to publish her memoirs in the 1960s. In 2018 Greenhill Books published the first English language edition of her memoirs, with a foreword by the Third Reich historian Roger Moorhouse.

She died on 25 April 2017, aged 97.

== Selected works ==
Rzhevskaya's literary work has earned her numerous awards.

- Memoirs of a Wartime Interpreter: From the Battle of Rzhev to Hitler's Bunker; London: Greenhill Books, 2018; contains Berlin, May 1945
- Berlin, May 1945 (Берлин, май 1945); Moscow: Pravda, 1988, Moscow: Soviet Writer, 1965
- Berlin, May 1945: Memories of a War Interpreter (Берлин, май 1945 : Записки военного переводчика); Moscow: Moscow Worker, 1986
- Immediate Approaches (Ближние подступы); Moscow: Soviet Writer, 1985
- There Was a War (Была война); Moscow: Soviet Writer, 1979
- In Kashira Library (В Каширской библиотеке), 1950.
- In the Den of Fascism: Memories of a War Interpreter. (В логове фашизма : записки военной переводчицы); Science and Life, 1967
- Spring Coat (Весна в шинели), 1961
- Ворошенный жар; New World, 1984
- Distant Rumble (Далёкий гул); Friendship of Peoples, 1988
- Домашний очаг : как оно было; Friendship of Peoples, 2005
- Alive, brother (Жив, браток); New World, 1987
- Over the Shoulders of the Twentieth Century (За плечами ХХ век), Moscow: AST, 2011
- Gravity (Земное притяжение), 1963.
- Punctuation (Знаки препинания); Moscow: Soviet writer, 1989
- Special Assignment: The Story of Scouts. (Особое задание: Повесть о разведчиках), 1951
- From Home to the Front (От дома до фронта), 1967.
- Why? Questions of the Literature (Почему? Вопросы литературы), 1999
- Many Years Later (Спустя много лет), 1969 (short stories and novellas)
- «…Так как все кончено…» : фрагмент из кн. «Геббельс. Портрет на фоне дневника», (Goebbels. Portrait on the background of the diary); Friendship of Peoples, 1994
- The war – The Face of War: a conversation with Elena Rzhevskaya, by T. Beck (У войны - лицо войны : беседа с писательницей Е. Ржевской; записала Т. Бек) Questions of the Literature, 1996
- February – The Curves of a Road (Февраль - кривые дороги) Moscow: Soviet writer, 1975
- It was in Moscow, Kiev, Paris ...: About Victor Nekrasov (Это было в Москве, в Киеве, в Париже… : О Викторе Некрасове); Friendship of Peoples; 2001

== See also ==
- Death of Adolf Hitler
