= Faithful Ruslan =

1975 dissident novel by Georgi Vladimov

Faithful Ruslan: The Story of a Guard Dog
- Author: Georgi Vladimov
- Original title: Верный Руслан. История караульной собаки
- Language: Russian
- Set in: Soviet Gulag
- Publisher: Posev
- Publication date: 1975
- Publication place: West Germany
- English publication date: 1979, 2011

Faithful Ruslan: The Story of a Guard Dog (Russian: Верный Руслан. История караульной собаки) is a 1975 novel by Soviet dissident writer Georgi Vladimov. It is the story of a guard dog from a Gulag labor camp, told from the point of view of the dog itself.

According to the author, the purpose of the novel was "to see the hell through the eyes of a dog who assumes it is a paradise". "Ruslan" was the name of the dog and a Russian given name that acquired popularity after the poem Ruslan and Ludmila by Alexander Pushkin.

== History ==
The first version of the novel was written during 1963-1965. It was initially published in 1975 by Posev publishing house of Russian emigrées in West Germany. The author dates the version submitted for this edition by 1974.

In an interview published in Posev magazine Vadimov recollects how it was written. An essayist N. Melnikov upon return from a business trip to Temirtau told the staff of Novy Mir a story of abandoned guard dogs who were starving because their training banned them from taking food from anywhere but their handlers. What is more, whenever seeing a group of people walking in an apparent formation, they would "guard" it and if someone strayed from the column, the dogs would try to force them back in file. Vadimov said that he quickly concocted a satirical story based on this plot and showed in to Alexander Tvardovsky (who headed Novy Mir). Tvardovsky agreed to accepted it, but heavily criticized the attempt to present an actual tragedy as a comedy. Vadimov retracted it, but it leaked into samizdat (with author's name removed). When in 1965 Vadimov submitted an improved version, it was rejected, because the liberalization period of the Khrushchev Thaw ended. When the staff of Posev publishing house contacted Vadimov, he revised the novel again. Initially it was published in Grani magazine in summer 1975, and in autumn of the same year the book edition was printed. After that Posev reprinted it in 1976, 1978, and 1981. In 1975 Soviet dissident Abram Tertz (Andrey Sinyavsky) published a detailed review of the book, in which he praised the author.

In the Soviet Union the novel was first published in 1989 in magazine Znamya.

== Plot summary ==
The story begins from the moment the labor camp is closed and demolished, and includes the dog's best reminiscences of its past.

After the labor camp is dismantled, Ruslan's handler chases the dog away, having no heart to shoot him. Many other guard dogs of the camp had the same luck. Over time most of them somehow found their ways in "civil" life, but Ruslan cannot forget his duty; he perceives the empty camp as one huge prisoners' escape and prefers to starve than to take food from stranger's hands. After some time Ruslan accidentally meets his master chatting with a former Gulag inmate nicknamed Potyorty (Потёртый, "Shabby"), but the master chases him away again, and Ruslan unexpectedly associates himself with Potyorty. The latter thinks he tamed the formerly vicious dog, but Ruslan sees Potyorty as a runaway inmate who returned voluntarily (he saw this happen many times) and decides to guard him until the "normal order of things" is restored.

Initially all dogs used to come to the railway station, waiting in vain for a train with a fresh party of inmates. Eventually all but Ruslan cease doing so. At last a train arrives, bringing a party of enthusiastic workers for a "great construction site of communism" to be launched at the site of the camp. Workers form a column and march forward with songs. Thinking that these are prisoners, the former guard dogs come out and take their usual posts around the column. The newcomers are puzzled, but the locals know what's going on and watch with morose expectation. A couple of workers step out of line and, perceiving this as an escape attempt, the dogs attack them. This causes the rest of the workers to panic, which causes more dogs to attack and soon the town is in chaos. The townspeople and workers fight the dogs and eventually kill all of them. Ruslan is mortally wounded, but manages to crawl back to the railway station, where he remembers his littermates being killed shortly after their birth and wonders if they were luckier than he, before finally dying himself.

== Literary opinions ==
As Andrey Gavrilov of Radio Liberty put it, it is a "portrayal of an inhuman system, which destroys in an animal something we would have liked to humanize."

Andrey Sinyavsky wrote that Ruslan is the picture of an ideal communist hero: his honesty, loyalty, heroism, discipline make him a true bearer of the Moral Code of the Builder of Communism. And at the same time it is a picture of how these ideal qualities become perverted in the communist society.

Paul Zweig writes that Ruslan is in a twisted "pact" of love with the human race, for the gulag guards are like gods to him: they may punish, but they also caress and give food. Zweig writes: "But here is the paradox that lifts Mr. Vladimov's tale beyond the realm of political argument: Ruslan's poisoned pact of love has made him curiously lovable — not a monster, but a deluded, yearning animal, for whom the orderliness of the camp has represented all the happiness he ever hopes to know. Mr. Vladimov's compression of thought here stunning, and his ironies leap effortlessly from the narrative itself. Ruslan stands for the citizen who, return for the “bliss” of obedience, has become a killer. Yet because Ruslan is also so vividly a dog, we do not judge him, but share the animal pain of his “pact.” For all his wolflike magnificence, he too is a victim."

== Editions ==
A list of editions of the novel may be found at Goodreads.

- Faithful Ruslan. The Story of a Guard Dog, translated by Michael Glenny
  - Simon & Schuster, 1979.
  - Melville House Publishing, 2011, ISBN 9781935554677

== Adaptations ==
In 1991 a film Faithful Ruslan (directed by Vladimir Khmelnitsky) was shot based on the novel.

In 2017 a play based on the novel, written by Helena Kaut-Howson based on Glenny's translation, was performed jointly by the Citizens Theatre in Glasgow, the Belgrade Theatre, Coventry, and KT Productions.
