= Lydia Chukovskaya =

Russian writer and poet (1907–1996)

- Born: March 24, 1907; Helsingfors, Grand Duchy of Finland, Russian Empire
- Died: February 7, 1996 (aged 88); Peredelkino, Russia
- Spouse: Matvei Bronstein
- Relatives: Korney Chukovsky
- Writing career
- Genres: Fiction, poetry, memoirs
- Notable work: Sofia Petrovna
- Notable awards: Andrei Sakharov Prize for Writer's Civic Courage

Lydia Korneyevna Chukovskaya (Russian: Ли́дия Корне́евна Чуко́вская, IPA: [ˈlʲidʲɪjə kɐrˈnʲejɪvnə tɕʊˈkofskəjə]; 24 March [O.S. 11 March] 1907 – February 7, 1996) was a Soviet and Russian writer, poet, editor, publicist, memoirist and dissident. Her deeply personal writings reflect the human cost of Soviet repression, and she devoted much of her career to defending dissidents such as Aleksandr Solzhenitsyn and Andrei Sakharov. The daughter of the celebrated children's writer Korney Chukovsky, she was wife of scientist Matvei Bronstein, and a close associate and chronicler of the poet Anna Akhmatova.

She was the first recipient, in 1990, of the new Andrei Sakharov Prize for Writer's Civic Courage.

== Early life ==
Chukovskaya was born in 1907 in Helsingfors (present-day Helsinki) in the Grand Duchy of Finland, then a part of the Russian Empire. Her father was Kornei Chukovsky, a poet who was a children's writer.

She grew up in St. Petersburg, the former capital of the empire torn by war and revolution. Chukovsky noted that his daughter would muse on the problem of social justice while she was still a little girl. But Lydia's greatest passion was literature, especially poetry. Their house was frequently visited by leading literary figures, such as Alexander Blok, Nikolay Gumilyov and Akhmatova. The city was also home to the country's finest artists—Lydia saw Feodor Chaliapin perform at the opera, for instance, and also met the painter Ilya Repin.

Chukovskaya got into trouble with the Bolshevik authorities at an early age, when one of her friends used her father's typewriter to print an anti-Bolshevik leaflet. She was exiled to the city of Saratov for a short period, but the experience did not make her particularly political. Indeed, upon her return from exile, she returned to Leningrad's literary world, joining the state publishing house Detgiz in 1927 as an editor of children's books. Her mentor there was Samuil Marshak, perhaps her father's biggest rival in Russian children's literature. Her first literary work, a short story entitled Leningrad-Odessa, was published around this time, under the pseudonym "A. Uglov".

Chukovskaya fell in love with a young physicist of Jewish origin, Matvei Bronstein, and the two soon married. In the late 1930s, Joseph Stalin's Great Terror enveloped the land. Chukovskaya's employer Detgiz came under attack for being too "bourgeois", and a number of its authors were arrested and executed. Matvei Bronstein also became one of Stalin's many victims. He was arrested in 1937 on a false charge and, unknown to his wife, was tried and executed in February 1938. Chukovskaya too would have been arrested, had she not been away from Leningrad at the time.

== Later life and career ==
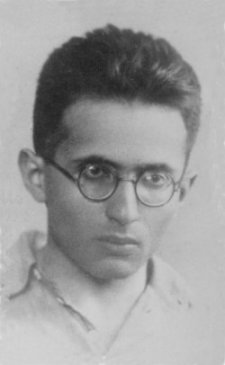
Matvei Bronstein, Lydia's husband

For several years, her life was to remain nomadic and precarious. She was separated from her daughter Yelena, and kept in the dark about her husband's fate. In 1939–1940, while she waited in vain for news, Chukovskaya wrote Sofia Petrovna, a harrowing story about life during the Great Purges. But it was a while before this story would achieve widespread recognition. Out of favour with the authorities, yet principled and uncompromising, Chukovskaya was unable to hold down any kind of steady employment. But gradually, she started to get published again: an introduction to the works of Taras Shevchenko, another one for the diaries of Miklouho-Maclay.

Chukovskaya was a lifelong friend of Anna Akhmatova, whom she visited seeking advice after her Bronstein's arrest. This was soon after Akhmatova had composed her Requiem, which she dared not write down. Chukovskaya was one of the first to hear it recited in private and commit it to memory. When they were evacuated from Leningrad in October 1941, after the German invasion of the USSR, they travelled together to Tashkent. Chukovskaya's next major work Spusk pod Vodu (Descent Into Water) described, in diary form, the precarious experiences of Akhmatova and Mikhail Zoshchenko. This book too was banned from publication in her native land. In 1964, Chukovskaya spoke out against the persecution of the young Joseph Brodsky; she would do so again for Solzhenitsyn and Andrei Sakharov. She wrote a series of letters in support of Solzhenitsyn; these were published in Munich in 1970.

By the time of Stalin's death in 1953, Chukovskaya had become a respected figure within the literary establishment, as one of the editors of the cultural monthly Literaturnaya Moskva. During the late 1950s, Sofia Petrovna finally made its way through soviet literary circles, in manuscript form through samizdat. Khrushchev's Thaw set in, and the book was about to be published in 1963, but was stopped at the last moment for containing "ideological distortions". Indomitable as ever, Chukovskaya sued the publisher for full royalties and won. The book was eventually published in Paris in 1965, but without the author's permission and under the somewhat inaccurate title The Deserted House. There were also some unauthorized alterations to the text. The following year, a New York City publisher published it again, this time with the original title and text restored.

In 1966, she wrote and distributed an open letter to Mikhail Sholokhov, the communist party's favourite writer, in response to his attack on the imprisoned writers, Andrei Sinyavsky and Yuli Daniel, reminding him that "The greatest of our poets, Alexander Pushkin, said with pride 'I have called for mercy to the fallen'."

In September 1973, unable to publish in the Soviet Union, Chukovskaya sent a letter abroad deploring the officially sponsored campaigns against Boris Pasternak in 1958, Aleksandr Solzhenitsyn in 1969, and the physicist Andrei Sakharov in 1973, and "professional stool pigeons" who supported them. In retaliation, the bureau of the Children's Literature section of the Moscow Writers' Union, to which she belonged, proposed that she be expelled. On 9 January 1974, she was summoned before the board of the Moscow writers' union, where guards prevented any of her friends or supporters from attending, and was formally expelled from the union, which ensured that she would not be allowed to publish anything again. Although the KGB monitored her closely, it is thought that the Soviet state refrained from meting out harsher punishment, because of her reputation in the West but also because of her father's indisputable stature in Soviet culture.

Her relationship with Akhmatova was the subject of two more books. Throughout her life, Chukovskaya also wrote poems of an intensely personal nature, touching upon her life, her lost husband, and the tragedy of her people.

In her old age, she shared her time between Moscow and her father's dacha in Peredelkino, a village that was the home to many writers including Boris Pasternak. She died in Peredelkino in February 1996.

Sofia Petrovna became legally available for Soviet readers only in February 1988 when it was published in the magazine Neva. This publication made possible publications of the other Lydia Chukovskaya's works as Chukovskaya explicitly forbade any publications of her fiction in the Soviet Union before an official publication of Sofia Petrovna.

== See also ==
- Mask of Sorrow

== Translated works ==
- The Deserted House Translated by Aline B. Werth. (1967) ISBN 0-913-12416-8
- Going Under Translated by Peter M. Weston. (1972) ISBN 0-214-65407-9
- To The Memory of Childhood Translated by Eliza Kellogg Klose. (1988) ISBN 0-8101-0789-9
- Sofia Petrovna Translated by Aline B. Werth; emended by Eliza Kellogg Klose. (1994) ISBN 0-8101-1150-0
- The Akhmatova Journals Translated by Milena Michalski and Sylva Rubashova; poetry translated by Peter Norman. (1994) ISBN 0-374-22342-4

== Awards ==
- 1990, the first recipient of the Andrei Sakharov Prize for Writer's Civic Courage.
