= Yury Dombrovsky =

Soviet writer (1909–1978)

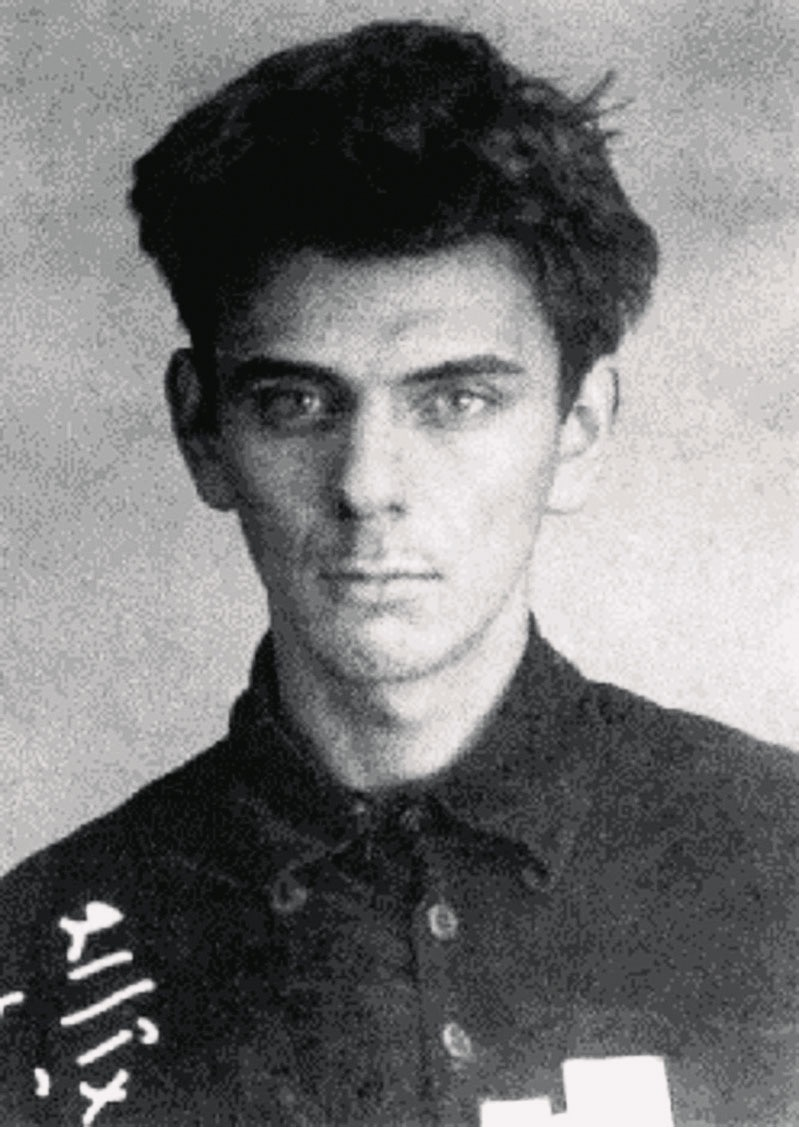
- Dombrovsky after arrest in 1932
- Born: 12 May [O.S. 29 April] 1909; Moscow, Russian Empire
- Died: 29 May 1978 (aged 69); Moscow, RSFSR, USSR
- Citizenship: Russian Empire (1909–1917); Soviet Russia (1917–1922); Soviet Union (1922–1978)
- Occupations: Poet, literary critic, novelist, journalist, archeologist
- Writing career
- Notable work: The Faculty of Useless Knowledge

Yury Osipovich Dombrovsky (Russian: Ю́рий О́сипович Домбро́вский; 12 May [O.S. 29 April] 1909 – 29 May 1978) was a Russian writer who spent nearly eighteen years in Soviet prison camps and exile.

== Life and career ==
Dombrovsky was the son of Jewish lawyer Joseph Dombrovsky and a Russian mother.

Dombrovsky fell afoul of the authorities as early as 1932 for his part in the student suicide case described in his novel The Faculty of Useless Knowledge. He was exiled to Almaty in Kazakhstan, where he established himself as a teacher and which provided the setting for his novel The Keeper of Antiquities. This work, translated into English by Michael Glenny, gives several ominous hints as to the development of the Stalinist terror and its impact in remote Almaty.

Dombrovsky had begun publishing literary articles in Kazakhstanskaya Pravda by 1937, when he was imprisoned again — this time for a mere seven months, having the luck to be detained during the partial hiatus between the downfall of Yezhov and the appointment of Beria.

Dombrovsky's first novel Derzhavin was published in 1938 and he was accepted into the Union of Soviet Writers in 1939, the year in which he was arrested yet again for the third time. By the protocol of the Special Meeting at the People's Commissar of Internal Affairs of the USSR on March 31, 1940, Dombrovsky was assigned eight years of forced labor camps as a preventive measure. This time he was sent to the notorious Kolyma camps in northeast Siberia, to Sevvostlag, of which we are given brief but chilling glimpses in The Faculty of Useless Knowledge.

Dombrovsky, partially paralysed, was released from the camps in 1943 and lived as a teacher in Almaty until 1949. There he wrote The Monkey Comes for his Skull and The Dark Lady. In 1949, he was again arrested, this time in connection with the campaign against foreign influences and "cosmopolitanism". This time, he received a ten-year sentence, to be served in the Tayshet and Osetrovo regions in Siberia.

In 1955, he was released and fully rehabilitated in 1956 due to the lack of "corpus delicti". Until his death in 1978, he lived in Moscow with Klara Fazulayevna (a character in The Faculty of Useless Knowledge). He was allowed to write and his works were translated abroad, but none of them were re-issued in the USSR. Nor was he allowed abroad, even to Poland.

The Faculty of Useless Knowledge (Harvill), translated by Alan Myers, the sombre and chilling sequel to The Keeper of Antiquities, took eleven years to write, being finished in 1975, and was published in Paris in 1978.

A widespread opinion is that this publication proved fatal. The KGB did not approve of the work. Dombrovsky received numerous threats over the phone and through the post; his arm was shattered by a steel pipe in the course of an assault on a bus, and he was finally brutally beaten by a group of unknown persons in the lobby of the restaurant of the Main House of Writers in Moscow. Two months after the incident, on May 29, 1978 he died in hospital from severe internal bleeding caused by varicose veins of the digestive system.

An account about Dombrovsky written by Armand Maloumian, a fellow inmate of the GULAG, can be found in Kontinent 4: Contemporary Russian Writers (Avon Books, ed. George Bailey), entitled "And Even Our Tears."

Jean-Paul Sartre described Yuri Dombrovsky as the last classic.

== Bibliography ==
- 1939: Derzhavin (Alma-Ata: Kazakhstanskoe izdatel’stvo khudozhestvennnoi literatury, 1939)
- 1943: Obez'iana prikhodit za svoim cherepom [The Ape is coming to pick up its Skull] (Moscow: Sovetsky pisatel’, 1959)
- 1964: Khranitel' drevnostei [The Keeper of Antiquities] (Novyi mir magazine 1964, No 7-8).
  - The Keeper of Antiquities (M. Glenny (trans.)) (London and Harlow: Longmans, 1969)
  - The Keeper of Antiquities (New York: McGraw-Hill, 1969)
  - The Keeper of Antiquities (Manchester: Carcanet Press, 1988)
  - The Keeper of Antiquities (London: Harper Collins [Harvill], 1991)
- 1969: Smuglaia ledi: tri novelly o Shekspire [The Dark Lady: Three Novellas About Shakespeare]
- 1970: Khudozhnik Kalmykov [The painter Kalmykov]
- 1973: Dereviannyi dom na ulitse Gogolia (1973) [The Wooden House on Gogol Street]
- 1974: Fakel (1974) [The Torch]
- 1975: Fakul'tet nenuzhnykh veshchei [The Faculty of Useless Knowledge] (Paris: YMCA-Press, 1978)
  - The Faculty of Useless Things (Part 3 excerpted in Soviet Literature, July 1990, pp. 25–117, translated by Andrew Bromfield)
  - The Faculty of Useless Knowledge (London: The Harvill Press, 1996)
- 1977: Ruchka, nozhka, ogurechik [A hand, a leg, a cucumber]. /That are words from popular kids song/ (Novyi mir magazine 1990, No 1)
