= Georgi Vladimov =

Soviet writer (1931–2003)

Georgi Nikolayevich Vladimov
- Георгий Николаевич Владимов
- Born: Georgi Nikolayevich Volosevich; February 19, 1931; Kharkiv, Ukrainian SSR
- Died: October 19, 2003 (aged 72); Frankfurt, Germany
- Education: Saint Petersburg State University
- Writing career
- Notable work: Faithful Ruslan
- Notable awards: Russian Booker Prize, Andrei Sakharov Prize for Writer's Civic Courage

Georgi Nikolayevich Vladimov (Russian: Гео́ргий Никола́евич Влади́мов; real family name Volosevich, Russian: Волосевич; 19 February 1931, Kharkiv – 19 October 2003, Frankfurt) was a Russian dissident writer.

== Biography ==
In 1977 he became the leader of the Moscow section of Amnesty International, forbidden in the USSR. In 1983, he emigrated to West Germany.

Vladimov's most famous novel is Faithful Ruslan, the tale of a guard dog in a Soviet Gulag, told from the dog's perspective. It circulated in the Soviet Union as a samizdat publication, before being published in West Germany in 1975.

His novel The General and His Army, on General Chibisov (Kobrissov) and General Vlasov, was awarded the Russian Booker Prize in 1995 and the Sakharov Prize in 2000.

== Works ==
- The Great Ore (Большая руда, 1961)
- Three Minutes' Silence (Три минуты молчания, 1969) English translation by Michael Glenny, 1985
- Faithful Ruslan (Верный Руслан, 1975)
- The Sixth Soldier, 1981
- Pay No Attention, Maestro (Не обращайте внимания, маэстро, 1983)
- The General and His Army (Генерал и его армия, 1994)
