= Ömer Naci Soykan =

Turkish philosopher

Ömer Naci Soykan (10 February 1945, Rize – 4 December 2017, Istanbul) was a Turkish philosopher.

== Life ==
He was born in 1945. He graduated from Trabzon High School in 1965. He studied Philosophy, Sociology, Ancient Greek and Latin in İstanbul University during his undergraduate period from 1965 to 1971. He was a visiting student in Hamburg University from 1969 to 1971. Soykan received his PhD in 1982 with his thesis entitled as “Forms of Being and Art in Schelling.” In the same year, he began to lecture in Mimar Sinan University. He worked as an assistant professor in Sociology Department of İnönü University from 1984 to 1986. He joined in Sociology Department of Mimar Sinan University in 1986. He became an associate professor in 1988 and a professor in 1996. He worked in the same department until 2006. After his being commissioned to found the Philosophy Department of Mimar Sinan Fine Arts University, he became the head of Philosophy Department, where he served until his retirement in 2013.

For 6 months, in 2001, he was invited to New York University (NYU) as a visiting scholar. He became the member of Internationale Schelling-Gesellschaft e.V. in 1987 and Austrian Ludwig Wittgenstein Society in 1996. He was also among the members of Philosophical Society of Turkey and Philosophical Association of Turkey.

== Work ==
Soykan has written over two hundred articles in Turkish and he also has written ten articles in German and English. In 2000, he gave a speech in Drew University’s Schleiermacher 2000 Conference in English. He has written seventeen books in Turkish; some of which are available in libraries like British Library, The Library of American Congress, Bibliothèque nationale de France. Some of his books are as follows:

- Philosophy and Language
- Art as Unity of Theory and Practice
- Philosophical Views from Turkey (4 Volumes)
- Investigations (2 Volumes).
