= Ostrožská Nová Ves =

- Municipality
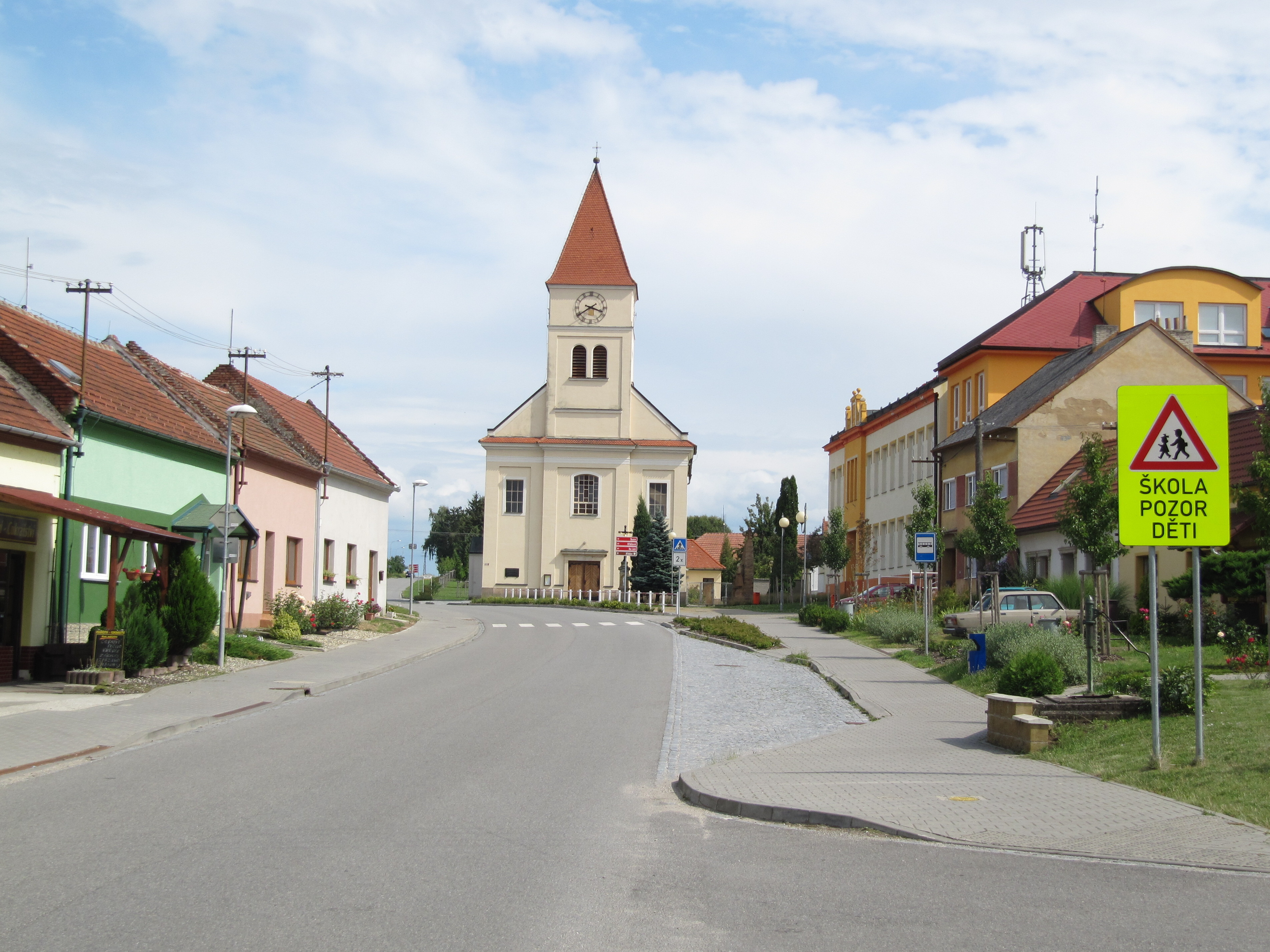
- Church of Saint Wenceslaus

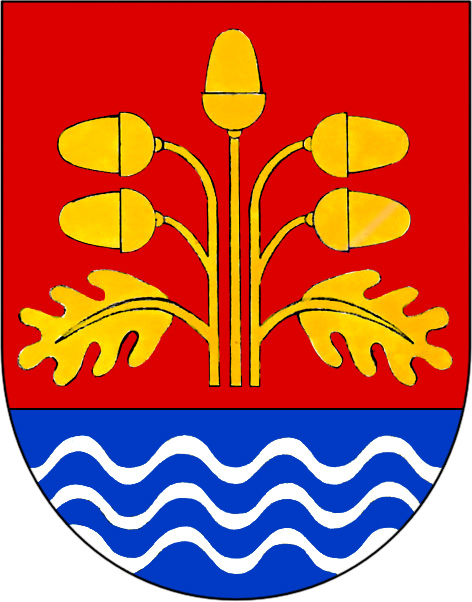
- Flag Coat of arms

- Location in the Czech Republic
- Coordinates: 49°0′16″N 17°26′11″E
- Country: Czech Republic
- Region: Zlín
- District: Uherské Hradiště
- First mentioned: 1258

Area
  - Total: 26.06 km^{2} (10.06 sq mi)
- Elevation: 182 m (597 ft)

Population (2026-01-01)
  - Total: 3,362
  - Density: 129.0/km^{2} (334.1/sq mi)
- Time zone: UTC+1 (CET)
  - Summer (DST): UTC+2 (CEST)
- Postal code: 687 22
- Website: www.onves.cz

Ostrožská Nová Ves (Czech pronunciation: [ˈostroʃskaː ˈnovaː ˈvɛs]) is a spa municipality and village in Uherské Hradiště District in the Zlín Region of the Czech Republic. It has about 3,400 inhabitants.

== Administrative division ==
Ostrožská Nová Ves consists of two municipal parts (in brackets population according to the 2021 census):

- Ostrožská Nová Ves (2,463)
- Chylice (794)

== Etymology ==
The name means "Ostroh's new village" in Czech.

== Geography ==
Ostrožská Nová Ves is located about 7 kilometres (4 mi) south of Uherské Hradiště and 29 km (18 mi) southwest of Zlín. The southeastern part of the municipal territory lies in the Vizovice Highlands, the northwestern part lies in the Lower Morava Valley. The highest point is at 288 m (945 ft) above sea level. The Morava River flows along the western municipal border.

In the western part of the territory is a set of artificial lakes known as Novoveská štěrková jezera ('Nová Ves gravel lakes'). They were founded on the site of former quarries where gravel was mined. The lakes are used as a drinking water reservoir, only Lake Albatros is used as a natural swimming pool.

== History ==
The first written mention of Ostrožská Nová Ves is from 1258, when it was called Dlouhá Ves. During the Hussite Wars, the village became abandoned. In 1464, after it was resettled, the village was named Nová Ves ('new village'). The village was burned down during the Austro-Turkish War in 1663 and during the Rákóczi's War of Independence in 1703–1704.

Until 1924, the municipality was called Nová Ves u Ostrohu, and then it was renamed Ostrožská Nová Ves. In 1949, the municipality of Chyjice was annexed to Ostrožská Nová Ves.

== Demographics ==
Historical population

Year	Pop.	±%
1869	2,422	—
1880	2,788	+15.1%
1890	3,121	+11.9%
1900	3,316	+6.2%
1910	3,543	+6.8%

Year	Pop.	±%
1921	3,477	−1.9%
1930	3,217	−7.5%
1950	3,483	+8.3%
1961	3,827	+9.9%
1970	3,766	−1.6%

Year	Pop.	±%
1980	3,557	−5.5%
1991	3,372	−5.2%
2001	3,348	−0.7%
2011	3,301	−1.4%
2021	3,257	−1.3%

Source: Censuses

== Economy ==
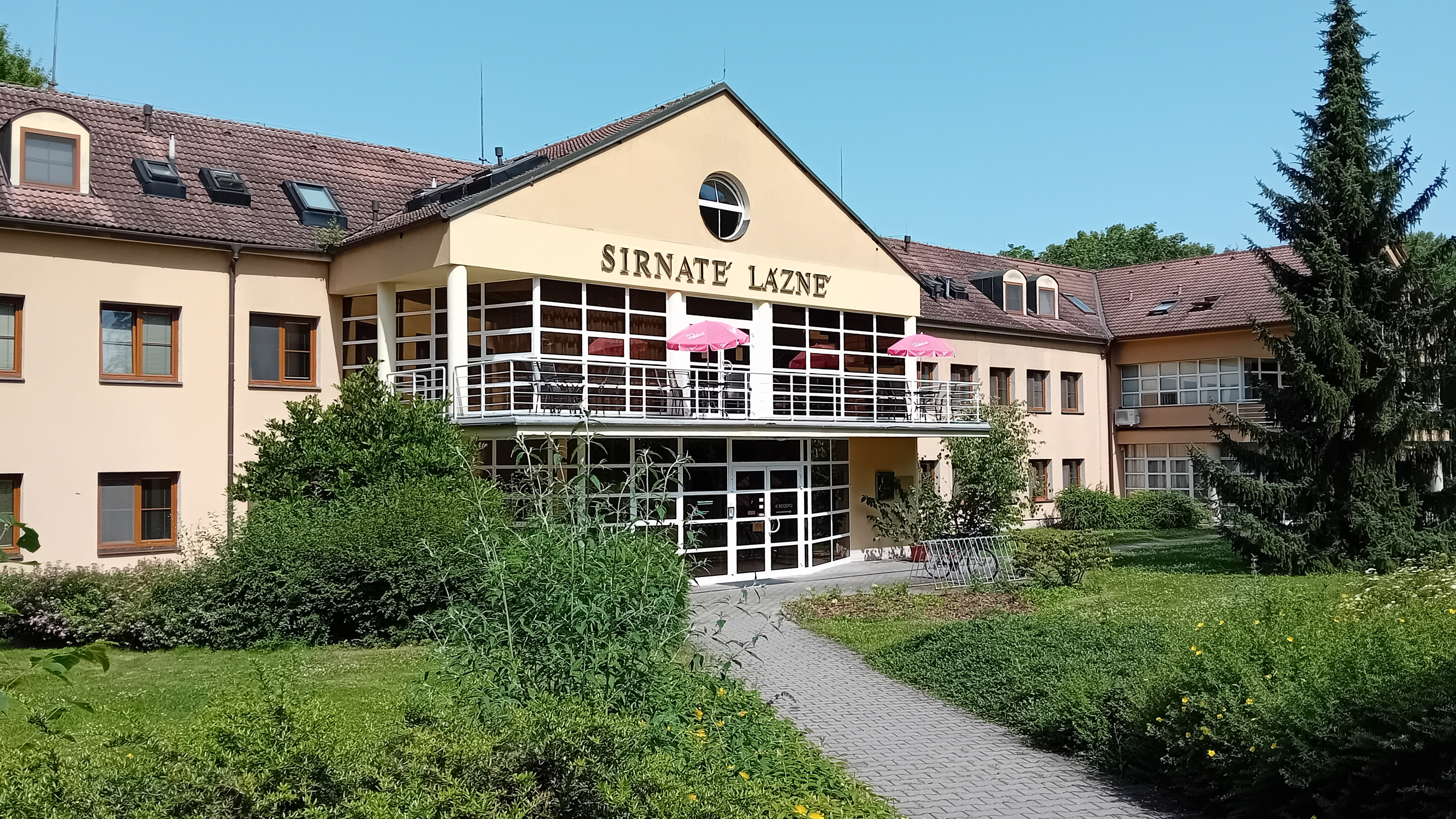
Main building of the spa

Ostrožská Nová Ves is known for its small sulfur spa. Spa has been developing since 1903, when the beneficial effects of sulfuric water from the local wetland were proven. Spa treatment is focused primarily on skin diseases (especially psoriasis) and diseases of musculoskeletal system.

== Transport ==
The I/55 road (the section from Uherské Hradiště to Hodonín) runs through the municipal territory.

Ostrožská Nová Ves is located on the railway line Brno–Uherské Hradiště.

== Sights ==
The main landmark of Ostrožská Nová Ves is the Church of Saint Wenceslaus. It was built in the late Baroque style in 1770.
