= Ben Pastor =

Italian writer

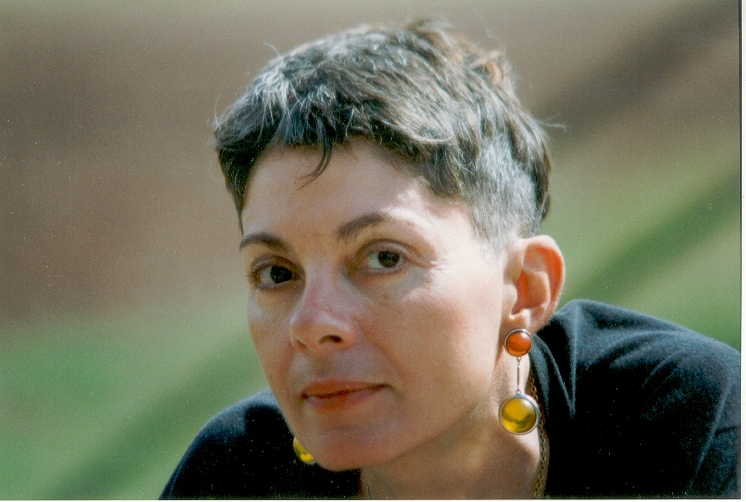
- Born: Maria Verbena Volpi; 4 March 1950 (age 76); Rome, Italy
- Citizenship: Italian, American
- Education: Sapienza University of Rome
- Occupation: Writer
- Writing career
- Pen name: Ben Pastor
- Genre: Historical mystery fiction
- Notable work: Martin Bora series
- Website: www.benpastor.com

Ben Pastor (born March 4, 1950), pseudonym of Maria Verbena Volpi, is an author born in Rome. She is known for her historical novels taking place in ancient Rome and in post World War II Germany. She has Italian and US citizenship.

== Biography ==
After studying archeology at the university La Sapienza in Rome, she moved to the United States where she has taught at various universities in Ohio, Illinois and Vermont.

== Works ==
In 2000 she published Lumen, the first detective novel in the series of Martin Bora, a tormented German officer-investigator based on the figure of Claus von Stauffenberg, executor of the attempt on Hitler's life in 1944. It is the first in a series of novels that follow Bora throughout his military career and the Second World War in Poland, Ukraine and Italy. A second series is built around Aelius Spartianus, a Roman soldier and detective in the fourth century. She is also the author of two books featuring Karel Heida and Solomon Meisl in Prague on the eve of the First World War.

Recurring themes in her work are the love of classical antiquity and the painful exploration of the human condition in times of war. Her work is characterized by a strong influence of postmodernism, where the classical rules of mystery mingle with those of the historical and the psychological novel. Pastor's literary style is sophisticated and complex, possibly the result of her passion for authors such as Herman Melville, Yukio Mishima, Joseph Roth, Toni Morrison, Nikos Kazantzakis and Georges Simenon, in addition to the influence of Raymond Chandler and Hans Hellmut Kirst.

== Awards ==
- 2020 Finalist for the Premio Emilio Sagari di Letteratura Avventurosa
- 2018 Premio Internazionale speciale Flaiano per la Letteratura
