= Andrei Sakharov Prize for Writer's Civic Courage =

Former annual literary prize in the Soviet Union

The Andrei Sakharov Prize for Writer's Civic Courage (1990–2007) was an annual literary prize established in the Soviet Union by the "Writers in Support of Perestroika" association (also known as the "Aprel" (April) association), in October 1990. It ceased to exist in 2007, when the "Aprel" association was dissolved.

The first recipient of the prize was Lydia Chukovskaya. The last recipient was Galina Drobot, editor-in-chief of the "Aprel" almanac. As the following list of recipients indicates, the prize was a "lifetime achievement" award and went to established figures. In this respect, it differed from the Andrei Sakharov "Journalism as an Act of Conscience" Award, which was first awarded in 2004.

== Recipients ==
- 1990: Lydia Chukovskaya (1907–1996)
- 1991: Bulat Okudzhava (1924–1997), Fazil Iskander (1929–2016)
- 1993: Boris Chichibabin (1923–1994)
- 1995: Semyon Lipkin (1911–2003), Lev Razgon (1908–1999), Yuri Davydov (1924)
- 1996: Elena Rzhevskaya (1919–2017)
- 1997: Boris Vasilyev (1924–2013)
- 1998: Zoya Krakhmalnikova (1929–2008)
- 2000: Georgi Vladimov (1931–2003)
- 2002: Vladimir Voinovich (1932)
- 2003: Mikhail Roshchin (1933–2010)
- 2004: Yunna Morits (1937)
- 2005: Nikolai Panchenko (1924–2005)
- 2007: Galina Drobot (1917–2009)
