= Yury Buida =

Russian author

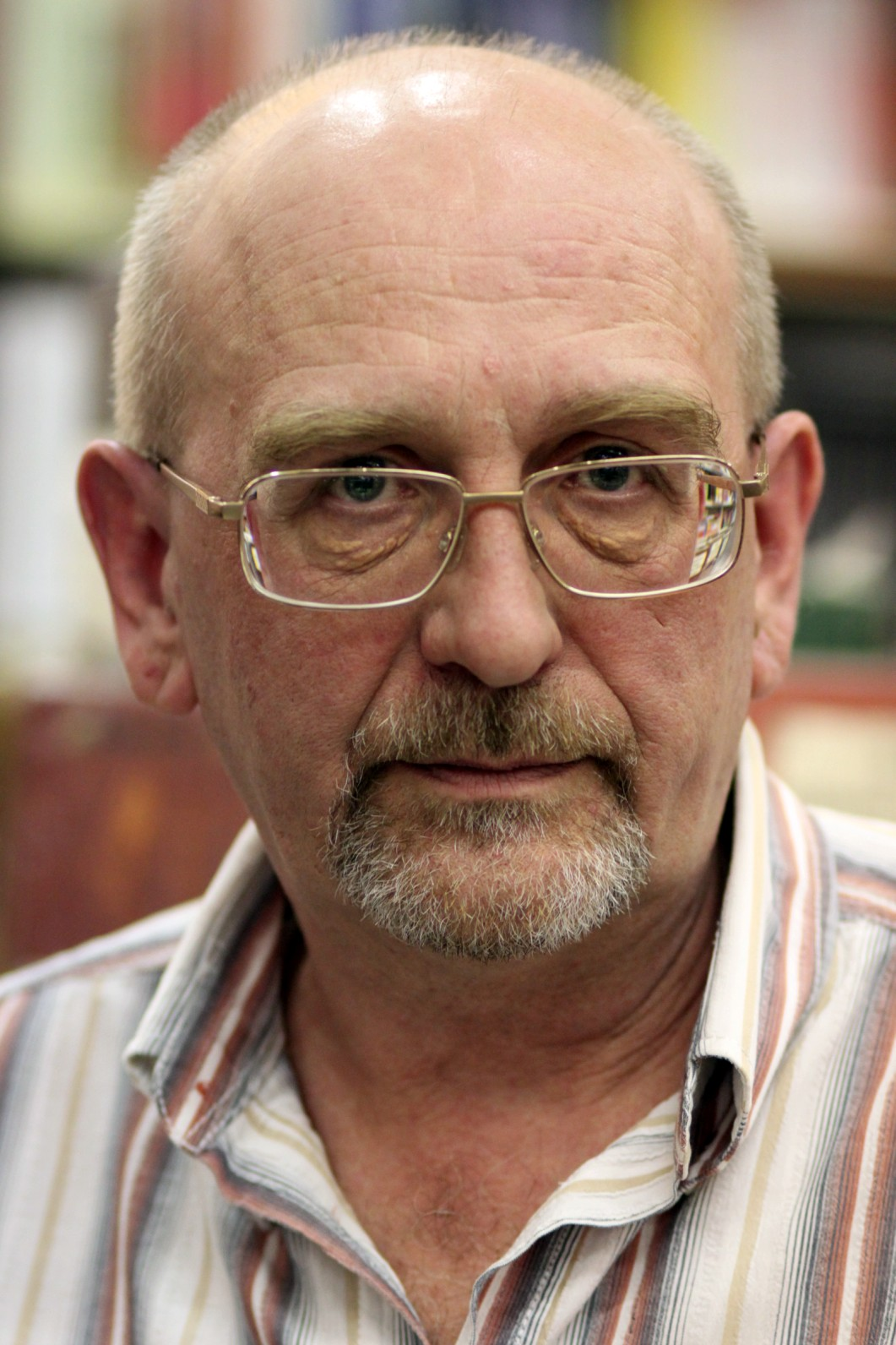
Yury Buida, 2011

Yury Vasilyevich Buida (Russian: Юрий Васильевич Буйда) (born 1954) is a Russian author. In 1994 his novel The Zero Train was shortlisted for the Russian Booker Prize. His short story collection The Prussian Bride won the Apollon Grigoriev Prize in 1999, and its translation by Oliver Ready won the Rossica Translation Prize in 2005.

== Life and work ==
He was born in Znamensk in the Kaliningrad region of Russia. He graduated from Kaliningrad University in 1982, then worked as a photojournalist and deputy editor for the regional newspaper. Since 1991, he has lived in Moscow and has written for several periodicals, including Izvestia. He is presently employed as an editor for the publishing division of Kommersant.

In his novel The Prussian Bride and to a lesser extent in the novella Königsberg, Buida explores the theme of the "complex attitudes of the Russian residents of the Kaliningrad region to the Prussian past".

== English translations ==
- The Zero Train, (novel), Dedalus, 2001.
- The Prussian Bride, (novel), Dedalus, 2002.
- Sinbad the Sailor, (story), from Russian Short Stories from Pushkin to Buida, Penguin Classics, 2006.
- More and More Angels and The Samurai's Dream, (stories), from 50 Writers: An Anthology of 20th Century Russian Short Stories, Academic Studies Press, 2011.
