= The Faculty of Useless Knowledge =

1978 novel by Yury Dombrovsky

- First edition
- Author: Yury Dombrovsky
- Translator: Alan Myers
- Language: Russian
- Genre: semi-autobiographical novel, philosophical novel
- Publisher: YMCA Press
- Publication date: 1978
- Publication place: Soviet Union

The Faculty of Useless Knowledge (Russian: Факультет ненужных вещей, romanized: Fakultet nenuzhnykh veshchey) is a novel by Yury Dombrovsky about the fate of Russian intelligentsia in the era of the Great Purge, written in 1964–1975. It completes a kind of dialogue begun by the novel The Guardian of Antiquities (published in 1964 in Novy Mir). The novel was dedicated to Dombrovsky's Novy Mir editor Anna Samoilovna Berser and published by YMCA Press in Paris; according to the popular version, the publication was the cause of Dombrovsky's death (possibly murder). In the USSR it was published in 1988.

== Synopsis ==
The novel takes place in the summer of 1937 in the city of Almaty. The protagonist of the novel, Georgy Nikolaevich Zybin, is a thirty-year-old historian and an employee of the ethnographic museum. For a long time Zybin has tried to live besides his epoch, not penetrating into the essence of events occurring around: arrests, public judicial processes and propagandistic hysteria. An authentic European humanist, Zybin cannot accept the socially obscuring and making total savages of people. Zybin sees himself as an irreplaceable fragment of a disappearing culture, on whom its fate depends, and he cannot reconcile himself with its demise and with the fact that the culture becomes a "faculty of unnecessary things". Being in a state of delirium at night, Zybin talks to Stalin: "What if you are right and the world will survive and prosper. Then the mind, conscience, goodness, humanity and everything that has been forged for thousands of years and was considered the goal of the existence of mankind, is worth nothing. To save the world, you need iron and flamethrowers, stone cellars and people with guns ... And I, and people like me, will have to fall to your boots like to an icon."

Zybin persuades himself to live "in a right way", meaning: "quietly, imperceptibly, don't push anyone, don't hurt, don't anger" – "I am the keeper of antiquities, that's it!", he tells himself. His life is externally safe. Beautiful Clara, an employee of the museum, is secretly in love with him. The director of the museum, a former Red commander, treats him with caring respect. The director warns Zybin: "Don't be partisan – be polite". An old man who works as a museum carpenter, is his faithful drinking companion. One day, Kornilov, a young scientist who was expelled from Moscow, appears in the museum. To Zybin, he is a man of his own breed – by fate and education.

But events are beginning to unfold with catastrophic acceleration. The old man Rodionov, an amateur archaeologist and a former partisan, confident in his services to the authorities, comes with his "discovery" – he demands to start excavations of the ancient capital in a place he will point out. Zybin knows that resisting the power of aggressive ignorance is pointless and dangerous, but still he resists. In the museum, he bickers in vain with the illiterate but ideologically savvy Zoya Mikhailovna. Zybin writes to a local newspaper quite neutral (so he thinks) notes about culture, but even for these he is reprimanded by Dyupova, the academic secretary of the local library. Dyupova says that the author did not reflect the work of librarians to serve the masses of workers and students.

Zybin is restless. He gets involved in an anecdotal story. A bloated newspaper hype about a giant boa allegedly living in the collective farm "Mountain Giant" threatens to break the life of brigadier Potapov. "Lawyers on vacation" are going to the collective farm. Accidentally, they meet a car on a night road that takes Zybin to the "lawyers", where it is explained to him that Potapov is an agent of German intelligence, and the story with the snake is a "cleverly conceived diversion". That same night, having met with Potapov, who is hiding, Zybin tries to help him. The foreman was able to find and kill the "boa", which turned out to be a very big runner. Together, they bring a bag with the killed snake to the museum, which gives the brigadier's last hope for salvation.

At the same time, some workers bring a discovery to the museum – a handful of gold plaques, part of a treasure they found. Upon learning that this is indeed archaeological gold, the workers disappear. The treasure is lost for the museum, and the NKVD (the KGB's predecessor) is signaled about the events. Zybin, meanwhile, goes to the steppe in search of the treasure. And here the arrest takes place, the one he has been expecting for a long time. He is accused of anti-Soviet propaganda, theft of valuables, and attempt to flee abroad. The case is conducted by department head Neumann, an experienced investigator and a clever man, and Kriputin, a rude specialist in knocking out the testimony. There is no proof of Zybin's guilt; the security officers expect to receive a confession from Zybin himself. He is taught by his cell mate, an old [Buddhism|Buddhist], that as it is impossible anyway to get out, it is more reasonable to confess to everything that is required – then the investigation will be easier, and the camp term will not be so long. For Zybin, however, a confession to an imperfect crime is tantamount to agreeing with the general lawlessness and falsity of the universe. When Kriputin, poured with professional anger, starts shouting at Zybin, hoping to break him, Zybin finds in himself the necessary rush of rage and strength he needs. He loses his fear.

Zybin's arrest is part of Neumann's grand plan. He has decided to prepare a large Moscow style show trial with an accusation of mass sabotage in the field of culture. The "conveyor method" is applied to Zybin: he is interrogated day and night by continuously changing investigators. But the detainee holds firm.

Kornilov is also invited to the NKVD. He is asked to help the authorities close the case against another museum employee, former priest Kutorgu. The investigator tells Kornilov that the NKVD has written a denunciation of Kutorgu but that they still think the old man is harmless. "If you are ready to vouch for him, do it. Just do it evidently and officially, in written form." Kornilov succumbs. The conversations that he has with Kutorgu are devoted mainly to the trial and execution of Christ and betrayal of his Teacher by his disciples. Here arises the most important themes of the novel: Christ and the world, the fate of Christianity in the modern world. Kornilov sincerely tries to convince himself of innocent conversations with Kutorgu and he writes reports on their meetings in which he characterizes the interlocutor as a loyal citizen. The reports are accepted with gratitude, but on his last visit to the NKVD Kornilov is taken to Colonel Gulyaev and the tone of the conversation changes dramatically. Gulyaev incriminates Kornilov in an attempt to deceive the investigation. He shows the reports on the same conversations written by Kutorgu: the former priest performed a similar task. And Kornilov is accused of anti-Soviet conversations. He is broken, the mouse trap is shut. As a result, Kornilov is openly recruited as a whistle-blower, selecting the undercover nickname Gadfly.

After Zybin has demanded to change the investigator, having declared a hunger strike, he is thrown in a solitary cell. There he is visited by the prosecutor Myachin and, suddenly, he easily agrees with Zybin's requirements. Myachin is Neumann's enemy, and the idea of a show trial seems delusional to him. At the same time there is one more circumstance: Polina Pototskaya, a longtime friend of Zybin and a bright woman, requests an appointment with the investigator Gulyaev. Gulyaev, Neumann and Myachin all talk to her. Polina reports that there is another person with whom Zybin once had a confidential conversation: he is the head of the investigatory department of the Prosecutor's Office of the USSR, a famous author, Roman Stern. The message hits Neumann. After all, not only is Stern a figure of inaccessible level, but also the brother of Neumann. The situation becomes dangerous for Neumann himself. He knows that even security officers are not eternal and colleagues of his have already disappeared into oblivion. Besides, Neumann is also tormented by another fear, the expression of "squeezed terror" in his eyes: he cannot justify what he is doing. From these doubts, Neumann comes out in a strange way: he replaces Kriputin with his young niece Tamara Dolidze – a novice, eager to work. Zybin is shocked by the phenomenon of the beautiful Tamara, but then he feels compassion for the fool who is infatuated with the romanticism of the KGB work. Having destroyed the scheme of accusation prepared by her, Zybin tries to explain to her the mistakes she made, to which she has no answer. Zybin, who has been ill for a long time, loses consciousness right in the investigator's office. He is transferred to the hospital, and the investigation stops. Then Neumann decides to get irrefutable evidence against Zybin himself. He goes to the steppe on the trail of Zybin. And here he receives news about the change of leadership and the arrests of the investigators and that he is summoned to the office. Neumann realizes that his fate is predetermined. By a coincidence, Neumann finds the gold, which was the reason for Zybin's arrest, with which he returns to the city. Zybin is told that his case is closed. He is free now. Zybin feels like a winner because he survived.

Zybin, Neumann and Kornilov meet at the end of the novel. In the park, they drink a bottle on the liberation of Zybin. At the same time, Neumann, having accepted his fate, also loses his fear, but due to the fatal circumstances. Here, on the bench, they are captured by a local artist. So on a piece of cardboard those three remained forever: the expelled investigator, the drunken informant nicknamed Gadfly (all time apparently need a Gadfly) and the third one, without whom these two could not exist.

== Historical background ==
The novel The Faculty of Useless Knowledge (as well as its "prologue" - Guardian of Antiquities) is in many ways autobiographical novel. The history of Zybin's arrest is also the history of the arrest of Yuri Dombrovsky himself. Investigators are deduced in the novel under their own names. The heroine of the novel Klara is Klara Fazulaevna Turumova-Dombrovskaya, the future wife of the writer. The story of the artist Kalmykov is a true story of life of a man who settled in Almaty in 1935.

== Critical reception ==
Literary scholar Valentin Nepomniyashchy, characterizes Dombrovsky's prose in his notes: "His novels are the author himself. According to the absolute realism of the narration, based solely on the common sense of iron logic and motivation, the complete absence of claims to the poetry, his prose is the machine with multiple details. But this machine is designed to fly and it flies like a bird. The design itself is airy ... He writes his prose in this way - as if he does not create, namely, tells us how it was, and immediately explains everything necessary to be understood correctly, without playing with the reader in any artistic games. And he gets the feeling that it is not an artistic prose at all, but a true being, almost documentary.» Another Gulag writer Varlam Shalamov, who had been friends with Dombrovsky for some time, said about the "Guardian of Antiquities" that it was "the best book about the thirty-seventh year". He also spoke well of the "Faculty..." and the rest of Dombrovski's prose.

The critic Igor Zolotussky, one of the first reviewers of the novel, noticed: "Yuri Dombrovsky makes it clear that the Christian idea is unthinkable without Christ, without his human behavior in conditions of cruelty and lawlessness. Only through his Son, through the same person as other people living on earth, God could find a way to the heart of mortals.

Critic I. Shtokman calls "The Faculty of Useless Knowledge" the "top of creativity" of the writer and draws attention to the fact that the architectonics of the novel "are exquisitely artistic with multiple levels of complexity... surprisingly well thought-out and complete. For all its diversity and multi-structure, the novel lies in the palm of the hand tightly as a sphere (the most perfect of all forms!), as a kind of charge for slinging, which has already become a weapon from a simple stone".

Critic E. Ermolin wrote: "Having read "The Faculty", I would say with a full measure of responsibility: this is the last great Russian novel in time (1975). A third of the century passed without Yuri Dombrovsky, and his main novel is not just, as it is commonly said, retains lasting significance. Somehow, it even grew in its artistic value."

== Editions in English ==
- Yury Dombrovsky. The Faculty of Useless Knowledge. Translated by Alan Myers. New York: Harvill/HarperCollins World, 1996
- Yury Dombrovsky. The Faculty of Useless Knowledge. Translated by Alan Myers. New York: Harvill Press, 2013
