= Marusya Klimova =

Russian writer and translator

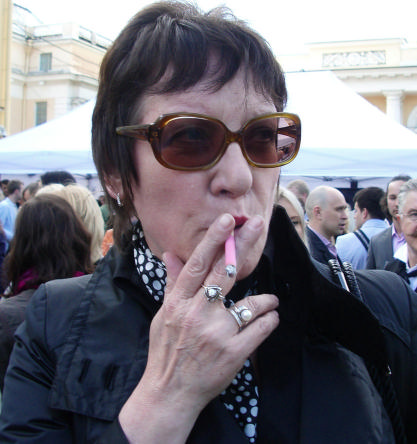
- Born: January 14, 1961 (age 65); Leningrad, Soviet Union
- Writing career
- Literary movement: Postmodernism
- Website: femme-terrible.com

Marusya Klimova (first name also transliterated Marusia or Maroussia; Russian: Мару́ся Кли́мова; real name Tatyana Nikolayevna Kondratovich, Татьяна Николаевна Кондратович; born January 14, 1961 in Leningrad, Soviet Union), is a Russian writer and translator. She lives in Saint Petersburg.

== Biography ==
Marusya Klimova is one of the most prominent representatives of counter−culture in modern Russian literature. In Marusya Klimova's oeuvre there is a combination of postmodernist irony, immoralism, misanthropy and adherence to a cult of pure beauty and genius in the spirit of decadence of the Age of Art Nouveau. Early in life, she was connected to the underground culture of Leningrad. In the early 1990s she lived in Paris.

In her autobiographical novels («Blue Blood» (1991), «The Little House at Bois-Colombes» (1998), «The Blonde Beasts» (2001)) there's a wide panorama of European life around 80s-90s described. The author creates the images of newly appeared Russian dandies and transvestites, who easily change their masks and dresses. Those metaphors correspond to the atmosphere of a universal carnival of those years, which were marked by prompt changes of social identifications.

«My History of the Russian Literature» (2004) is a union of a collection of essay and a novel of ideas. Classical Russian writers' destinies and works are represented and seen in that book as the facts and from the perspective of personal biography of the author. This book, abounding of paradoxical and exaggerated subjective judgements, has caused a huge indignation in readers' minds and environment. It became one of the most scandalous phenomena of Russian literature in the last decade.

Marusya Klimova's works have been translated to French, German, English, Estonian, Serbian and Italian languages.

She is also known as a translator. Marusya Klimova is the author of translations from French to Russian (Louis-Ferdinand Céline, Jean Genet, Pierre Guyotat, Georges Bataille, Monique Wittig, Michel Foucault, Pierre Louÿs, etc.).

She is a Chevalier of the Ordre des Arts et des Lettres (2006).

== Books ==
- Golubaya krov (Blue Blood, 1996)
- Domik v Bua-Colomb (The Little House at Bois-Colombes, 1998)
- Morskiye rasskazy (Marine Stories, 1999)
- Belokurye bestii (The Blonde Beasts, 2001)
- Selin v Rossii (Céline in Russia, 2000)
- Moya istoriya russkoy literatury (My History of Russian Literature, 2004)
- Parizhskiye vstrechi (Paris Meetings, 2004)
- Moya teoriya literatury (My Theory of Literature, 2009)
- Portret hudojnitzy v junosti (A Portrait Of The Artist As A Young Woman, 2012)
- Bezumnaja mgla (Mad Haze, 2013)
- Profil Gelderlina na noge anglijskogo poeta (Holderlin Profile On The Leg Of The English Poet, 2016)
- Holod i otchujdenie (Cold and alienation, 2019)

== Notes ==
- (en) Interview for Underpass. (Underpass, August 2017)
- (en) Fair-haired Furies. Extract from the novel «The Blonde Beasts». (Underpass, August 2017)
- (it) Elisa Navetta, "I 'mostri' di Marusja Klimova". (Rome, Slavia, №3, 2001)
- (fr) Entretien avec Maroussia Klimova. Propos recueillis par Guillaume Fau. Revue de la Bibliothèque nationale de France n° 38, 2011.
- (de) Karlheinz Kasper. Das literarische Leben in Russland 2001. „Osteuropa“ N4, 2002
- Website for author (in Russian)
