= Franta Sauer =

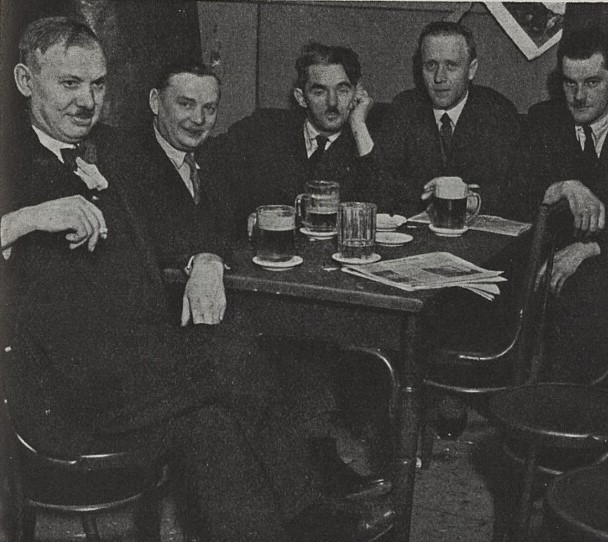
Franta Sauer sitting first from the left, 1936

František "Franta" Sauer (4 December 1882 – 26 March 1947) was a Czech writer and close friend of fellow writer Jaroslav Hašek.

== Early life ==
Franta Sauer was the seventh of eight children born to Barbora Sauerová (née Hájková) and Jan Sauer in Prague. Even though Sauer's parents were illiterate and poor, Sauer was an avid reader throughout his childhood. His father worked as a yardmaster on the railway and as a street hot dog vendor before he got injured and had to stop work. His mother worked as a maid. After struggling in a traditional school, Sauer enrolled in a vocational school to become a locksmith. After completing his training, he returned to the District of Prague Žižkov, where he lived with his mother and sister.

== Politics ==
For a short period of time, Sauer was a member of the Social Democratic Party and was eventually imprisoned for his left-wing views. News outlets frequently discussed stories about Sauer's life.

In November 1918, Sauer organized the demolition of the Marian Column of Prague in the Old Town Square. On 4 November 1923, he confessed to organizing the demolition in an article published in Rudé právo. During his trial, he claimed that although he was motivated by patriotism to remove the column, he had no intention of damaging it. As his actions were not barred, he was not sanctioned after his trial.

In 1918, Sauer organized the club Černá Ruka in the Žižkov, which helped move homeless people into classified apartments. Ivan Olbracht mentioned the club's actions in his novel Anna Proletářka.

At the end of World War II, Sauer was arrested for distributing publications by T. G. Masaryk and was relocated to Terezín. He was released in 1945 because he suffered from tuberculosis.

== Friendship with Jaroslav Hašek ==
In 1921–1922, Sauer co-published his first book, The Good Soldier Švejk, with Hašek. Sauer raised enough funds to publish the first edition and wrote the sequel with Hašek from the book's proceeds.

== Death and legacy ==
He appeared in front of a camera for the last time in 1947 in Čapek's Tales. Sauer died of tuberculosis in 1947; before his death, he made a general confession in the Franciscan Monastery, Prague, including that he regretted the demolition of Marian Column and begged for forgiveness from the priest. After being given his last rites, he died in the Pod Petřínem hospital and was buried in the Olšany cemeteries. In 2016, the City of Prague adopted his grave. His spiritual evolution is mentioned in the poem Pražská legenda (The Prague Legend) by Václav Renč.

== Work ==
Aside from his own name, Sauer published under the pseudonyms Fr. Habán, Franta Habán from the Žižkov, and Franta Kysela. Between 1911 and 1935, Sauer was published in journals such as České slovo, Právo lidu, Rudé právo and Trn.

=== Books ===
- Naše luza jezuité a diplomaté
- In memoriam Jaroslava Haška
- Pašeráci
- Emil Artur Longen a Xena
- Pašeráci
- Haškův poslední podnik
- Franta Habán ze Žižkova

=== Theater plays ===
- Franta Habán ze Žižkova (1933)
- Haškův poslední podnik (1946)

=== Filmography ===
- 1947 Čapkovy povídky
- 1931 Miláček pluku
- 1931 Poslední bohém
- 1931 Skalní ševci
- 1931 Ze soboty na neděli

=== Inspiration ===
- František Sauer is a character in the novel Anna Proletářka by Ivan Olbracht.
