= Ljudmila Filimonova =

Soviet speed skater

Personal information
- Born: September 1962 (age 63)

Sport
- Country: Soviet Union (until December 1991); Russia
- Sport: Speed skating

Ljudmila Filimonova also written as Lyudmila Filimonova (Russian: Людмила Филимонова; born September 1962) is a former Soviet and Russian long track speed skater, who was active between 1980 and 1996.

Filimonova represented her nation at the European Speed Skating Championships for Women in 1989. In this championship she was doping tested and both the a- and b-test had a positive result for performance-enhancing drugs. Filimonova's results from the championship were therefore disqualified. She was then banned for 15 months.

She also competed at other international competitions, including Dynamo Cups.

Between 1982 and 1997 she had a total of 19 starts at national championships. She won the silver medal at the 1991 Russian Single Distance Championships in the 1500 metres event and also the silver medal at the 1992 Russian Single Distance Championships in the 1500 metres event.

After her main career she was active as a master, and became two times master world champion.

== Records ==
=== Personal records ===
Personal records
Women's speed skating
Event	Result	Date	Location	Notes
500 m	42,60	25.03.1983	Medeo	
1000 m	1.24,25	18.03.1988	Medeo	
1500 m	2.07,43	15.12.1988	Medeo	
3000 m	4.29,23	27.12.1982	Medeo	
5000 m	7.44,28	15.12.1988	Medeo	
