= Zinovy Zinik =

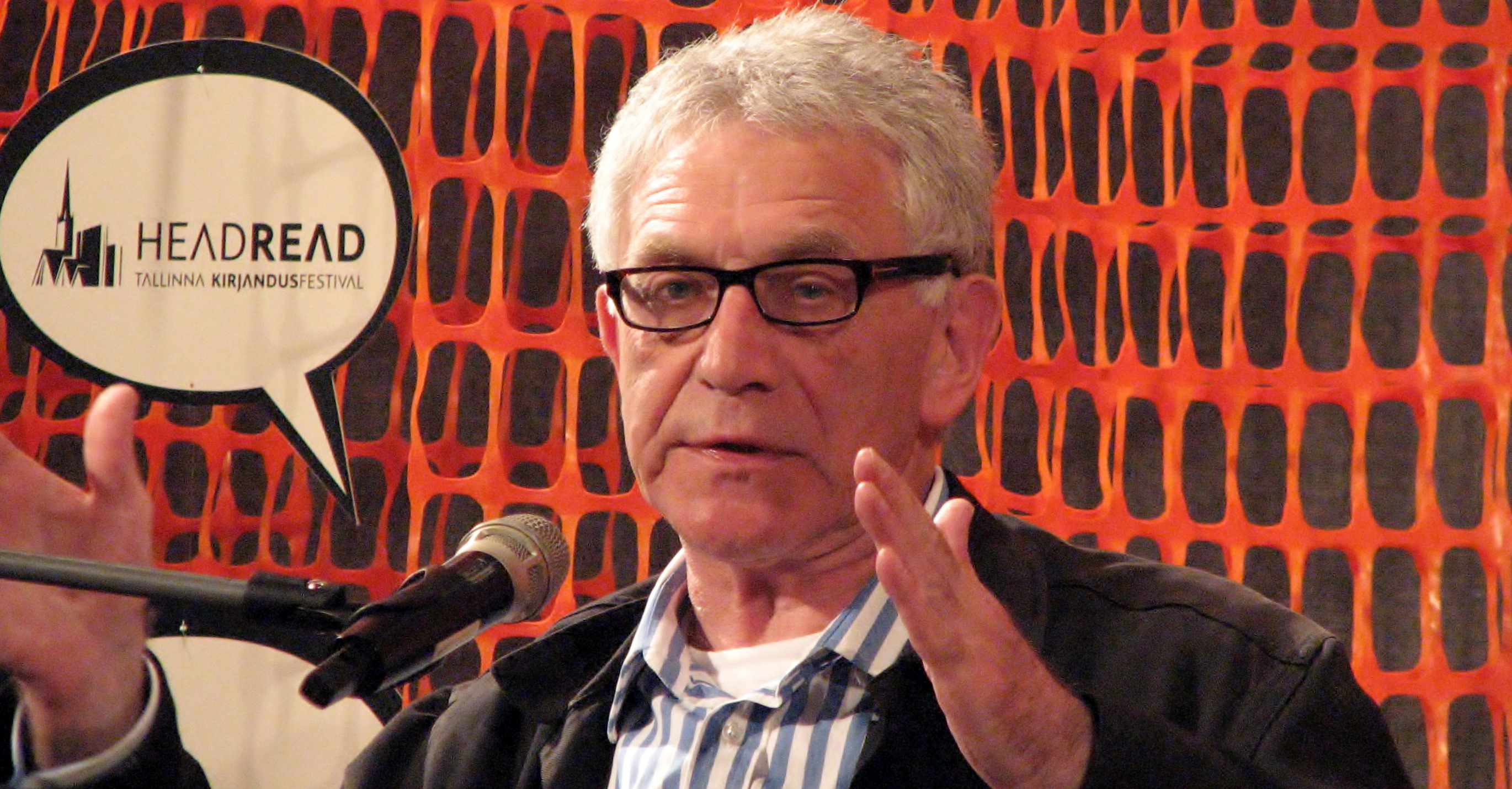
- Zinik at HeadRead literary festival in Estonia
- Born: 1945 (age 80–81); Moscow, Russia
- Citizenship: United Kingdom, Russia
- Education: Moscow State University
- Occupation: Writer

Zinovy Zinik (Russian: Зиновий Зиник; born 16 June 1945) is a Russian-born British novelist, short-story writer, and essayist.

== Life and career ==
A native of Moscow, he was born to a Russian-Jewish family. Zinik studied art at one of the city's art schools and later studied geometrical topology at Moscow State University. He also attended a school of theatre criticism run by Moscow theatre magazine Teatr.

At the beginning of the 1960s, Zinik became a close friend and associate of the conceptual artist Alexander Melamid. In his early writing, Zinik was influenced by his older friends and mentors, Alexander Asarkan (1930-2004), a mail-artist and theatre critic; and Pavel Ulitin (1918–1986), who used cut-ups technique in his avant-garde prose.

In 1975, Zinik was stripped of his Soviet citizenship with his emigration to the West. For a year he worked as a theatre director for a student theatre group at the Hebrew University of Jerusalem. Then in 1976, he was invited to contribute to BBC radio and since 1977, he has permanently lived and worked in London, writing in English as well as in his native Russian. He became a British citizen in 1988.

Zinik was one of the first Russian authors of his generation who chose to depict the lives of his compatriots outside Russia. The ambiguities of émigré existence, cultural dislocation, estrangement and the evasive nature of memory have become not only the main topic of Zinik's prose, which includes novels, short stories, essays, lectures and radio broadcasts, but also his ‘literary device’. Zinik's eighteen books of prose published since his departure from Russia dwell on the dual existence of bilingual immigrants, religious converts, political exiles and outcasts – from habitués of Soho (Mind the Door, 2001) to the sect of Jewish Muslims in Istanbul (Yarmulkes under the Turbans, 2018).

Zinik's prose first appeared in Russian émigré periodicals such as Vremia I Mi [Time and Us] and Syntaxis. His early novels, - Une Personne déplacée, Une Niche au Panthéon andService Russe - first appeared in French translations published by Albin Michel, Paris. His prose has also been translated into Dutch, Hebrew, Polish, Hungarian, Bulgarian, German, Lithuanian and Estonian. His comic novel Russian Service (1983) about an émigré broadcaster, scared of poison umbrellas, as well as many of his short stories have been adapted for radio; his novel The Mushroom Picker was made into a film by BBC TV (1993). His short comic opera Here Comes the Tiger was staged by Lyric Hammersmith theatre in London (1999). Zinik's dramatic narrative My Father’s Leg was commissioned and broadcast by BBC Radio 3 in 2005 and subsequently published as a novel in Russian in Ural magazine.

Of Zinik's later works, his two collections of comic stories in Russian about his life in England At Home Abroad (2007) and Letters from the Third Shore (2008), and his collection of essays Emigration as a Literary Device (2011), were published in Moscow. His autobiographical tale History Thieves (2010) is about Zinik's grandfather in Berlin and the ambiguity of our ethnic roots.Zinik's collection of prose in Russian, Third Jerusalem (2013), is dedicated to the links between Jerusalem and Moscow in the 1970s. His comic gothic novel Sounds Familiar or The Beast of Artek (2016) - about the manipulation of our childhood monsters and fears – is set in London. An experimental novel The Orgone Box (2017), full of allusions to the life of the Marxist Freudian thinker Wilhelm Reich is written in an Anglicised Russian. The nonfiction A Yarmulke under the Turban (2018) is about Zinik's travels around Turkey retracing the steps of the self-proclaimed Jewish Messiah Shabtai Zvi who converted to Islam in 1666. This book was shortlisted for The New Writing Prize [Novaya Slovesnost'] in Moscow in 2018. In the 1990s, two of Zinik's novels were long-listed for the Russian Booker prize.

Zinik has taught creative writing at the Hebrew University of Jerusalem; Wesleyan University, Ct, USA; University of Denver Co. USA; Columbia University, NYC, USA. He regularly contributes to BBC Radio, the Times Literary Supplement and other periodicals. Until 2011, Zinik had been the freelance editor and presenter of his "West End Radio Review" for the BBC World Service in Russian and, until 2018, the UK Editor of the satirical quarterly Artenol (New York).

== Bibliography ==
=== Novels and novellas ===
- Извещение (Tel-Aviv, 1976, Yekaterinburg, 2003), (The Notification, included in One-Way Ticket, London, 1994 and Mind the Doors, New York, 2001);
- Перемещенное лицо (Tel-Aviv, 1977, New York, 1985), Une person Déplacée (Paris, 1981);
- Ниша в Пантеоне (Tel-Aviv, 1981), Une Niche du Pantheon (Paris, 1986);
- Уклонение от повинности (Dodging conscription, Tel-Aviv, 1982);
- Русская служба (Paris, 1983, Moscow 1993), Service Russe (Paris, 1984);
- Руссофобка и фунгофил (London, 1986, Moscow, 1991), The Mushroom Picker (London,1987);
- Лорд и егерь (Moscow, 1991), The Lord and the Gamekeeper, (London 1991);
- Встреча с оригиналом (A Meeting with the Original, Moscow, 1998);
- Нога моего отца (My Father's Leg, Yekaterinburg, 2005), (based on the original English broadcast by BBC Radio 3, London, 2005);
- Письма с третьего берега (Letters from the Third Shore, 2008);
- History Thieves (London, 2011);
- Sounds Familiar or the Beast of Artek (London, 2016);
- Ящик оргона (The Orgone Box, 2017);
- Ермолка под тюрбаном (A Yarmulke under the Turban, Moscow, 2018).

=== Fiction and non-fiction collections ===
- Русская служба и другие истории (Russian Service and other stories, Moscow, 1993);
- One-Way Ticket (New York, 1995);
- Mind the Doors (New York, 2001);
- У себя за границей (At Home Abroad, Moscow, 2007);
- Эмиграция как литературный прием (Emigration as a Literary Device, Moscow, 2011);
- Третий Иерусалим (Third Jerusalem, Moscow, 2013);
- Нога моего отца и другие реликвии (My Father's Leg and other Relics, Moscow,2020);
- Нет причины для тревоги (No Cause for Alarm, Moscow, 2022).

=== Essays and short stories ===
Zinik has written several essays and short stories in Russian that have been published in a variety of journals and publications.
