= Andrei Filimonov =

Russian footballer

Personal information
- Full name: Andrei Alekseyevich Filimonov
- Date of birth: 19 January 1985 (age 41)
- Place of birth: Moscow, Russian SFSR
- Height: 1.79 m (5 ft 10 1/2 in)
- Positions: Midfielder; forward

Youth career
- FShM-Torpedo Moscow

Senior career*
Years	Team	Apps	(Gls)
2001–2005	FC Torpedo Moscow	0	(0)
2006	FC Spartak Vladikavkaz	29	(0)
2008	FC Olimp-SKOPA Zheleznodorozhny		
2008	FC Istra	17	(1)
2009	FC Astrakhan	1	(0)
2009	FC Volga Tver	13	(0)
- * Club domestic league appearances and goals

Andrei Alekseyevich Filimonov (Russian: Андрей Алексеевич Филимонов; born 19 January 1985) is a former Russian professional football player.

== Club career ==
He made his debut for FC Torpedo Moscow on 20 August 2003 in the Russian Premier League Cup semifinal against FC Zenit Saint Petersburg. He also appeared in the return leg against Zenit two weeks later.
