= American Library in Paris Book Award =

American Library in Paris Book Award was created in 2013 with a donation from the Florence Gould Foundation. It is awarded each November with a remunerative prize of $5,000 to "a work written originally in English that deepens and stimulates our understanding of France or the French.."

The American Library in Paris "was founded and originally run by American expatriates in Paris in 1920, with books that had been sent by American libraries to soldiers fighting in World War I."

== Honorees ==
=== 2013 ===
The shortlist was announced in September, and the winner in December 2013.

Winner: Fredrik Logevall, Embers of War: The Fall of an Empire and the Making of America's Vietnam

Shortlist:

- Simon van Booy, The Illusion of Separateness
- Alex Danchev, Cezanne: A Life (about Paul Cézanne)
- Tom Reiss, The Black Count: Glory, Revolution, Betrayal, and the Real Count of Monte Cristo
- Marilyn Yalom, How the French Invented Love

Jury: Diane Johnson, Adam Gopnik and Julian Barnes

=== 2014 ===
The shortlist was announced in July, and the winner in November 2014.

Winner: Robert Harris, An Officer and a Spy

Shortlist:

- Jonathan Beckman, How to Ruin a Queen: Marie Antoinette, the Stolen Diamonds and the Scandal that Shook the French Throne
- Frederick Brown, The Embrace of Unreason: France 1914 - 1940
- Sean B. Carroll, Brave Genius: A Scientist, a Philosopher, and their Daring Adventures from the French Resistance to the Nobel Prize
- Philip Dwyer, Citizen Emperor: Napoleon in Power 1799 - 1815
- Francine Prose, Lovers at the Chameleon Club, Paris 1932

Jury: Alice Kaplan, Sebastian Faulks, and Pierre Assouline

=== 2015 ===
The shortlist was announced in July, and the winner was announced 6 November 2015.

Winner: Laura Auricchio, The Marquis: Lafayette Reconsidered

Shortlist:

- Nancy L. Green, The Other Americans in Paris: Businessmen, Countesses, Wayward Youth 1880-1941
- Richard C. Keller, Fatal Isolation: The Devastating Paris Heat Wave of 2003
- Sue Roe, In Montmartre: Picasso, Matisse, and Modernism in Paris, 1900-1910
- Ronald Rosbottom, When Paris Went Dark: The City of Light Under German Occupation 1940-1944

Jury: Laura Furman, Lily Tuck, Fredrik Logevall

=== 2016 ===
The shortlist was announced in July, and the winner was announced on 3 November 2016.

Winner: Ethan B. Katz, The Burdens of Brotherhood: Jews and Muslims from North Africa to France

Shortlist:

- Jo Baker, A Country Road, A Tree
- Sarah Bakewell, At the Existentialist Café: Freedom, Being, and Apricot Cocktails
- Julie Barlow and Jean-Benoît Nadeau, The Bonjour Effect: The Secret Codes of French Conversation Revealed
- David Drake, Paris at War: 1939-1944
- Lucy Sante, The Other Paris

Jury: Laura Auricchio, Robert Harris, Robert O. Paxton

=== 2017 ===
The shortlist was announced in July, and the winner was announced on 3 November 2017.

Winner: David Bellos, The Novel of the Century: The Extraordinary Adventure of Les Misérables

Shortlist:

- David McAninch, Duck Season: Eating, Drinking, and Other Misadventures in Gascony, France's Last Best Place
- Adam Gidwitz, The Inquisitor's Tale: or, The Three Magical Children and Their Holy Dog
- Ross King, Mad Enchantment: Claude Monet and the Painting of the Water Lilies
- Nadja Spiegelman, I'm Supposed to Protect You From All This: A Memoir
- Susan Rubin Suleiman, The Némirovksy Question: The Life, Death, and Legacy of a Jewish Writer in Twentieth-Century France

Jury: Adam Gopnik, Bruno Racine, Stacy Schiff

=== 2018 ===
The shortlist was announced in July, and the winner was announced on 8 November 2018.

Winner: Julian Jackson, A Certain Idea of France: The Life of Charles de Gaulle

Shortlist

- Adam Begley, The Great Nadar: The Man Behind the Camera
- Bijan Omrani, Caesar's Footprints: A Cultural Excursion to Ancient France: Journeys Through Roman Gaul
- Rupert Thomson, Never Anyone But You
- Caroline Weber, Proust's Duchess: How Three Celebrated Women Captured the Imagination of Fin-de-Siècle Paris

Jury: Diane Johnson, David Bellos, and Pierre Assouline

=== 2019 ===
The shortlist was announced in July, and the winner was announced on 7 November 2019.

Winner: Marc Weitzmann, Hate: The Rising Tide of Anti-Semitism in France (and What it Means for Us)

Shortlist

- Edward Carey, Little: A Novel
- Andrew S. Curran, Diderot and the Art of Thinking Freely
- David Elliott, Voices: The Final Hours of Joan of Arc
- Stéphane Hénaut and Jeni Mitchell, A Bite-Sized History of France: Gastronomic Tales of Revolution, War, and Enlightenment
- Julie Orringer, The Flight Portfolio: A Novel

Jury: Alice Kaplan, Thomas Chatterton Williams, and Pamela Druckerman

Coups de coeur

In addition to the six shortlisted titles, the screening committee selected the following five books as worthy of special recognition:

- Mark Braude, The Invisible Emperor: Napoleon on Elba from Exile to Escape
- Peter Caddick-Adams, Sand and Steel: The D-Day Invasion and the Liberation of France
- Christopher L. Miller, Impostors: Literary Hoaxes and Cultural Authenticity
- Whitney Scharer, The Age of Light: A Novel
- Christopher Tilghman, Thomas and Beal in the Midi

=== 2020 ===
The shortlist was announced in July, and the winner was announced on 14 January 2021.

Winner: Maggie Paxson, The Plateau

Shortlist

- Bill Buford, Dirt: Adventures in Lyon as a Chef in Training, Father, and Sleuth Looking for the Secret of French Cooking
- James Gardner, The Louvre: The Many Lives of the World's Most Famous Museum
- Caitlin Horrocks, The Vexations: A Novel
- Rachel Mesch, Before Trans: Three Gender Stories from Nineteenth-Century France
- Maurice Samuels, The Betrayal of the Duchess: The Scandal That Unmade the Bourbon Monarchy and Made France Modern

Jury: Ethan Katz, Rachel Donadio, and Jake Lamar

=== 2021 ===
The shortlist was announced in July 2021, and the winner was announced on 20 January 2022.

Winner: Sudhir Hazareesingh, Black Spartacus: The Epic Life of Toussaint Louverture

Shortlist

- Michaela Carter, Leonora in the Morning Light
- Edmund de Waal, Letters to Camondo
- Emma Rothschild, An Infinite History: The Story of a Family in France over Three Centuries
- Jane Smiley, Perestroika in Paris

Jury: Lauren Collins, Julian Jackson, Dinaw Mengestu, and Maggie Paxson

=== 2022 ===
The shortlist was announced in July 2022, and the winner was announced on 3 November 2022.

Winner: Graham Robb, France: An Adventure History

Shortlist

- Amanda Bestor-Siegal, The Caretakers, A Novel
- Maud Casey, City of Incurable Women
- J.P. Daughton, In the Forest of No Joy: The Congo-Océan Railroad and the Tragedy of French Colonialism
- Peter Watson, The French Mind: 400 Years of Romance, Revolution and Renewal

Jury: Charles Trueheart (chair), Thomas Chatterton Williams, and Alexandra Schwartz

=== 2023 ===
The ten-title longlist was announced in June 2023, the five-title shortlist was announced in September 2023, and the winner was announced on 9 November 2023.

Winner: Katherine J. Chen, Joan: A Novel

Shortlist

- Lynn Gumpert and Debra Bricker Balken, eds, Americans in Paris: Artists Working in Postwar France, 1946–196
- Joel Warner, The Curse of the Marquis de Sade: A Notorious Scoundrel, a Mythical Manuscript, and the Biggest Scandal in Literary History
- Julian Jackson, France on Trial: The Case of Marshal Pétain
- Trica Keaton, #You Know You're Black in France When…: The Fact of Everyday Antiblackness

Longlist

- John Hardman, Barnave: The Revolutionary Who Lost His Head for Marie-Antoinette
- Rod Kedward, The French Resistance and Its Legacy
- Mark Braude, Kiki Man Ray: Art, Love, and Rivalry in 1920s Paris
- R. Howard Bloch, Paris and her Cathedrals
- Anne E. Linton, Unmaking Sex: The Gender Outlaws of Nineteenth-Century France

Jury: Lauren Groff (chair), Doan Bui, and Sudhir Hazareesingh

=== 2024 ===
The ten-title longlist was announced in June 2024, the five-title shortlist was announced in September 2024, and the winner was announced on 7 November 2024.

Winner: Adam Shatz, The Rebel's Clinic: The Revolutionary Lives of Frantz Fanon

Shortlist

- Robert Darnton, The Revolutionary Temper Paris, 1748-1789
- Justine Firnhaber-Baker, House of Lilies: The Dynasty That Made Medieval France
- Claire Messud, This Strange Eventful History
- Jackie Wullschläger, Monet: The Restless Vision

Longlist

- Anne Higonnet, Liberty Equality Fashion: The Women Who Styled the French Revolution
- C.L.R. James and Illustrated by Sakina Karimjee and Nic Watts, Toussaint Louverture: The Story of the Only Successful Slave Revolt in History
- Leah Redmond Chang, Young Queens: Three Renaissance Women and the Price of Power
- Maurice Samuels, Alfred Dreyfus: The Man at the Center of the Affair
- Cole Stangler, Paris is Not Dead: Surviving Hypergentrification in the City of Light

Jury: Andrew Sean Greer (chair), Jonas Hassen Khemiri, and Ayelet Waldman
