= JFK: Coming of Age in the American Century, 1917–1956 =

2020 biography by Fredrik Logevall

JFK:Coming of Age in the American Century, 1917–1956
- First edition cover
- Author: Fredrik Logevall
- Illustrator: Photo by Al Fenn/The Life Picture Collection/Getty Images, Copyright Martha Stewart
- Cover artist: Design by Lucas Heinrich
- Language: English
- Subject: The life of John F. Kennedy prior to his run for President
- Genre: Nonfiction
- Publisher: Random House
- Publication date: September 5, 2020
- Publication place: New York, USA
- Media type: Print (hardback), ebook available
- Pages: 792 (With index)
- ISBN: 9780812997132

JFK: Coming of Age in the American Century, (1917–1956) is a 2020 biography written by historian Fredrik Logevall. Published by Random House in September 2020, the work examines the education, military service, and political career of an American president who had acquired a great deal of his knowledge of international relations in his early years. According to Logevall, it was Kennedy's knowledge of international relations gained in his youth that allowed him to steer the nation through the perilous deadlocks, short-term victories, and failures of the Cold War.

The book unveils John F. Kennedy's early relationships, his formative WWII experiences, his ideas, writings and political aspirations, which the author believed took shape at an early age and were independent of his father's desire for him to enter public life. The author follows Kennedy through the birth of the Cold War, first showing Kennedy's awareness as a young journalist in 1945 of the threat of an imperialistic Russia.

Logevall observed that Kennedy's awareness of the imperialistic nature of Russia during the Cold War and his wariness of the nature of communist expansionism later influenced his goals as president to keep America first in diplomacy, improve ties with foreign countries in the Americas, and to keep America first in scientific and military technology. This focus led Kennedy to later establish the Peace Corps, Alliance for Progress with Latin America, and the continuation of the Apollo program with the goal of landing a man on the Moon before 1970.

Logevall attributes Kennedy's grasp of international relations in part to his Harvard education in government with a concentration in international relations, as well as the familiarity he gained from assessing the views of the many world leaders he met in his early life as a wealthy son of the U.S. ambassador to the United Kingdom from 1938 to 1940. It is Logevall's belief that Kennedy's early grasp of international relations would later guide him in the critical decisions he later made as president. Kennedy would learn more about the international climate during his brief college travels in Western Europe and Germany prior to 1940, and his far-ranging global junkets in 1951 as a young senator.

== Author description ==
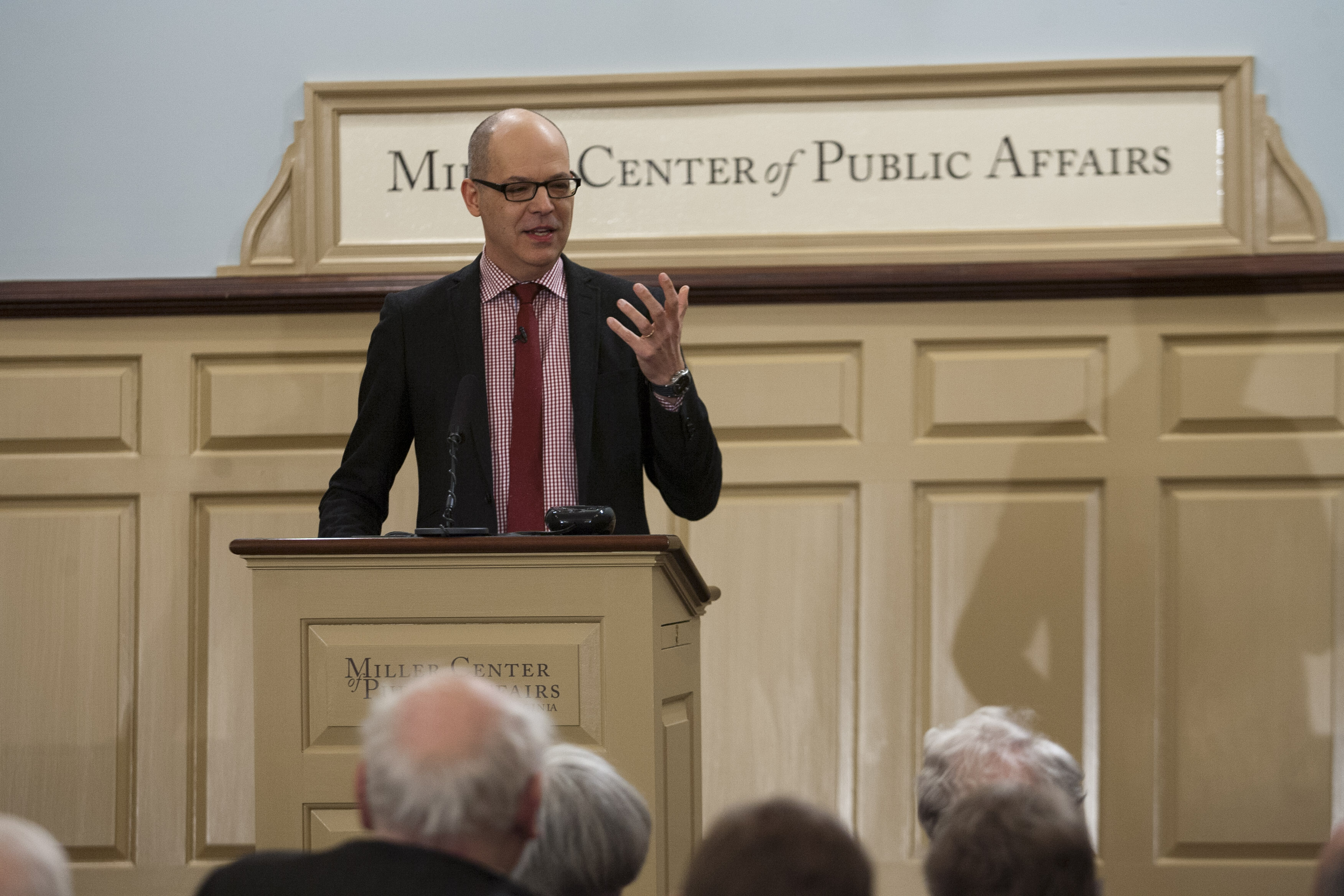
Fredrik Logevall

Fredrik Logevall, a professor of international affairs and history at the Harvard Kennedy School had previously written over ten books on the topic of foreign relations. In 2012, he published Embers of War: The Fall of an Empire and the Making of America’s Vietnam, which covered US motivations for entering the Vietnam War and went on to win the Pulitzer Prize for History and the Francis Parkman Prize. In 2020, he published America's Cold War: The Politics of Insecurity, which examined the successes and failures of US involvement in the Cold War.

== Content ==
=== Family background ===
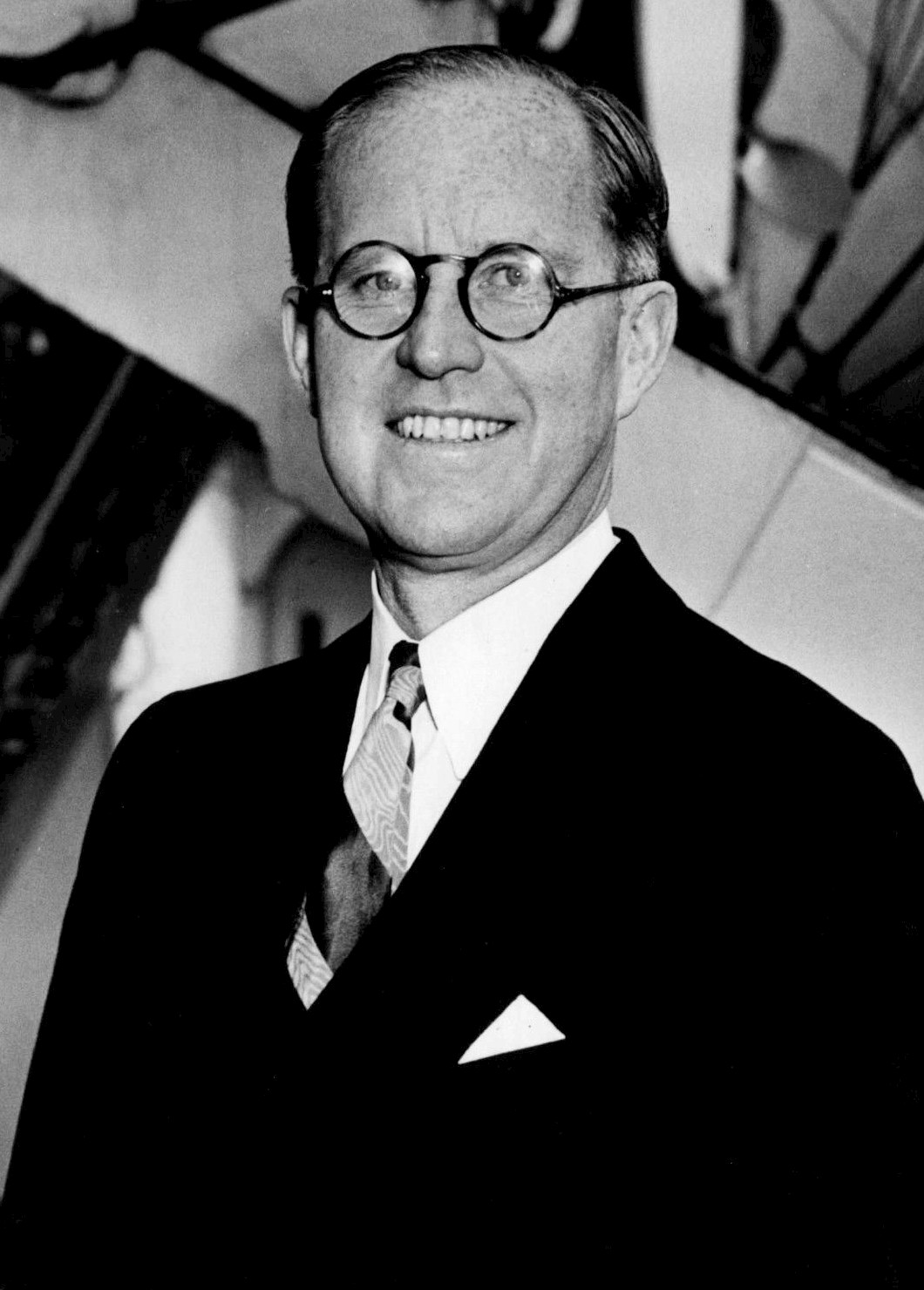
Joseph Kennedy Sr., 1938

Logevall's heavily researched biography begins with a brief description of the life of Kennedy's grandparents and takes note of the early life of his father Joseph as a good, though not exceptional, student at Boston Latin, and a particularly high-achieving athlete in High School. A description of the political life of JFK's grandfathers further supports Logevall's views that Kennedy was well groomed to a life in public service through early life experiences with his family. The author includes important detail often omitted from other works, including the early stock investments that netted Joseph P. Kennedy his first million as a trader with Hayden, Stone, and Company, and his earlier work as a manager of the Fore River Shipyard where he first met Franklin Roosevelt, who was at the time Assistant Secretary of the Navy. Joseph Kennedy's work as chair of the U.S. Maritime Commission gave him important contacts in the Navy.

Alluding to the research of Daniel Okrent and 2012 Joseph Kennedy biographer David Nasaw, Logevall agreed that there was little substantive evidence in the widely held belief that Joseph Kennedy partnered with mob figures to make a part of his fortune in bootlegging during Prohibition in the 1920s. As Logevall noted, Joseph Kennedy did expand his fortune by gaining distribution rights to several brands of Scotch whiskey, and later through real estate investments, and ownership and management of RKO and other Hollywood interests. Others may continue to believe that a significant portion of Joseph Kennedy's early wealth was acquired through ruthless business tactics and what would today be considered insider securities trading, a view that Nasaw and Logevall did not entirely discount. It could be noted that in the 1920s and early 1930s, laws codifying the nature of insider business trading were scarce. These took greater shape during the birth of the Security and Exchange Commission, which Joseph Kennedy piloted from 1934 to 1935 after his appointment by Franklin Roosevelt.

=== Lack of parental affection ===
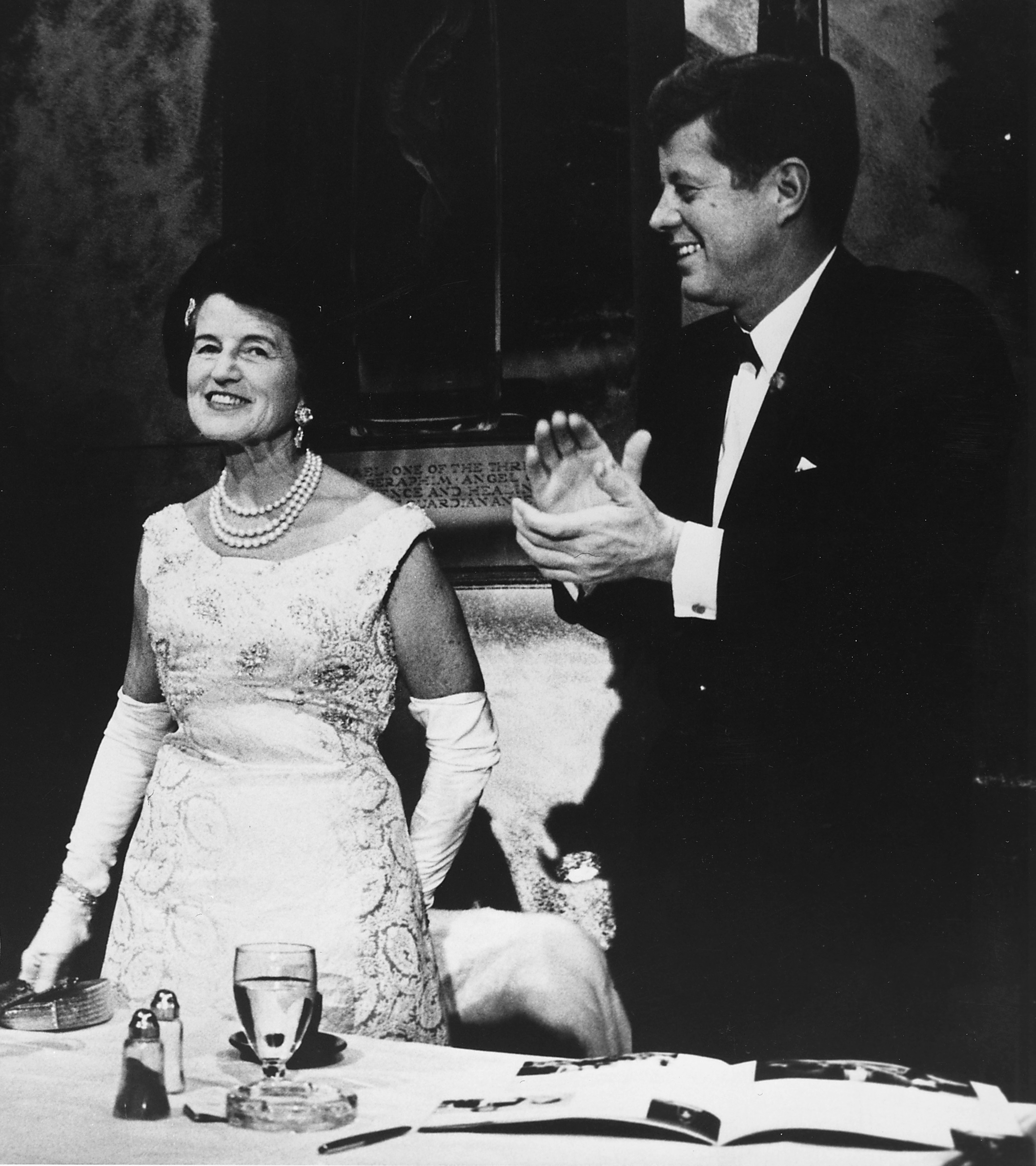
JFK and Rose, 1962

Interestingly, Logevall notes that Rose Kennedy's rare displays of physical affection towards her children, for which she often took criticism from other Kennedy biographers, and which many Kennedy biographers, including Nigel Hamilton, consider an important factor in the development of JFK's promiscuity, was likely influenced by Rose's familiarity with the works of child psychologists of the day who discouraged such displays as being detrimental to proper childhood development. Logevall observed that the authors of magazine articles of the period from 1910 to 1935, as well as the noted psychologist John B. Watson, "considered 'too much love' to be the greatest threat to a child's welfare." Watson, author of Psychological Care of Infant and Child (1928), believed "since society does not overly comfort children as they become young adults in the real world, parents should not set up these unrealistic expectations." The widely read authority on parenting young children, L. Emmet Holt, "warned mothers against coddling children or playing with them or displaying a lot of affection with them."

=== Independent political aspirations ===
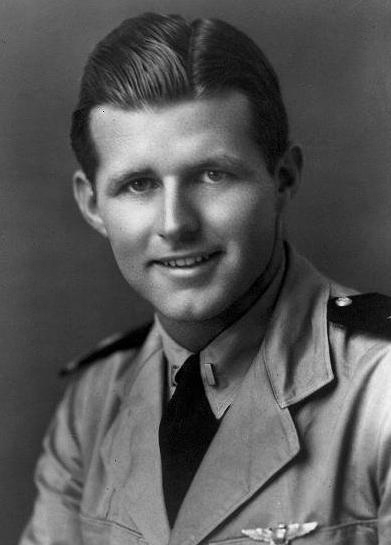
Joseph P. Kennedy Jr., c. 1942

Logevall writes that Joseph Kennedy Sr. had harbored stronger political aspirations for John's brother Joseph Kennedy Jr., whom the elder Kennedy may have viewed as more capable and intelligent, as evidenced by his higher school grades, better health, and the fact that JFK was nearly kicked out of his prep-school Choate for mischief. Central to his book's theme, Logevall strongly presses the point that Kennedy chose his career in public service and politics, and was not forced into it by his father to substitute for the life in politics Kennedy Sr. had hoped for Joe Junior, hopes that were lost when Joe Junior died prematurely in WWII.

To support Logevall's view that John Kennedy and not his father chose politics as his profession, Logevall cites Kennedy's choice of government, history, and international relations as his college major at Harvard, Kennedy's love of travel where he could learn more about foreign cultures, leaders, and governments, and the author's belief that JFK, from his own statements, was more intrigued with the prospect of a life of public service than that of working as a writer or academic. Kennedy discussed his desire to have a life in politics with some of his early friends, including Inga Arvad during WWII. As noted by Logevall, in 1942, he and Arvad had mused at length about him running for office, not excluding the presidency. He also noted that though his father wanted him to make his first political run as Massachusetts's lieutenant governor, Kennedy strongly preferred a run for the House of Representatives where he could use his knowledge of foreign relations to play a stronger role in America's future. This demonstrated that Kennedy's choices of public office were not exclusively the result of his father's influence or direction. As Logevall observed, long before making the choice to lead a life of public service by running for office, Kennedy was in the center of world politics through his travels, particularly while meeting several of the British members of Parliament while his father was Ambassador to Great Britain.

=== America's entry into WWII ===
At only 22, after a seven-month trip from Moscow to Jerusalem, having questioned his father's isolationism, Kennedy was in Berlin in early September 1939, to witness firsthand Prime Minister Neville Chamberlain announce Britain's intent to enter the war. Kennedy was more moved however, by Churchill's idealistic speech on September 3 as chairman of the Admiralty that the war would "establish the rights of the individual", and would be a "war to establish and revive the stature of man." Logevall also noted that as a great admirer of Churchill, JFK's speeches may have at times been written in a similar tone and cadence.

Logevall stressed Kennedy's strong belief in the need for America to enter WWII, though it differed markedly from his father's isolationist stance as Ambassador to Britain, and noted importantly that Kennedy advised his father after he lost his post as Ambassador to Britain on how to softly modify and explain his isolationist views.

=== Why England Slept, 1940 ===
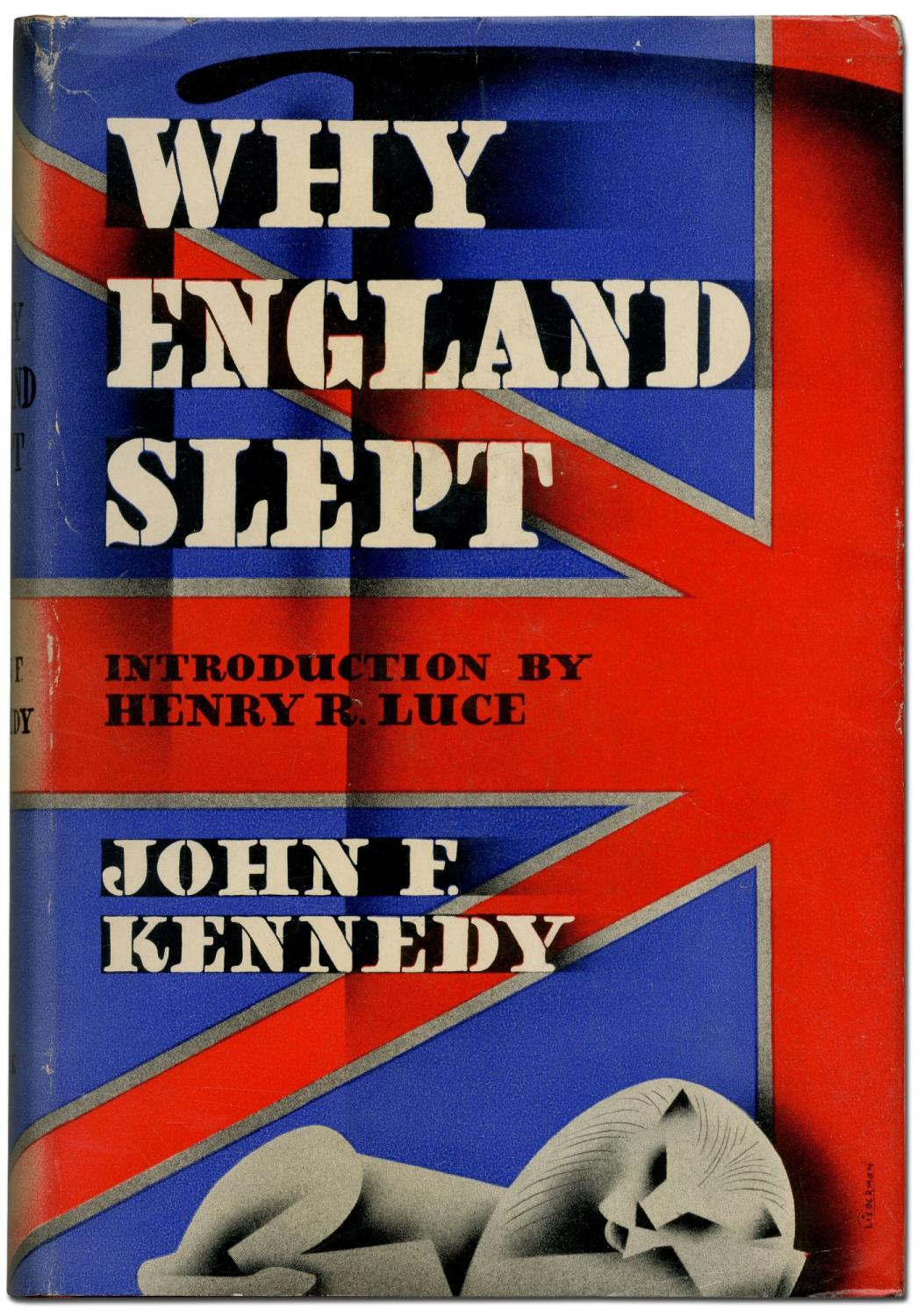
Why England Slept front cover

Logevall believed that Kennedy's senior thesis at Harvard, which was later titled Why England Slept, demonstrated his awareness that carefully studied, yet timely actions were the key to making effective foreign policy decisions, and that cool objectivity and pragmatism should be the guiding rule. As Logevall observed, in his senior thesis, the 21-year-old Kennedy already had a "commitment to an unsentimental realism in international affairs". Kennedy reasoned "foreign threats could not be dealt with by ignoring them or wishing them away", rather "they must be confronted by clearheaded and informed calculation". Logevall noted that though Why England Slept detailed the reasons why Great Britain was not ready for Nazi invasion in 1939, rather than castigating what many consider the popular appeasement policy that the British government then pursued under Chamberlain, Kennedy was noted for taking the uncommon stance that if Great Britain had confronted Nazi Germany earlier it would have been far more disastrous for her than the delay caused by the appeasement policies of Chamberlain and other British leaders. Logevall observed, as have other historians, that Kennedy's Harvard College thesis's publication in 1940, largely due to the connections and financing of Joseph Kennedy, elevated JFK's public image and aided in his future political aspirations, which had not yet fully taken form. Despite Joseph Kennedy's isolationist views, Logevall also noted that Kennedy's senior thesis, and the influence of his Harvard government professors influenced his strong anti-fascist views, and his strong belief that America should enter WWII against Germany. Logevall observed that this point highlighted that at an early age, John Kennedy's political views were distinct from his father's.

As noted by David Nasaw, a Joseph P. Kennedy historian, JFK also concluded that Prime Minister Chamberlain "had no choice but to appease Hitler because an antiwar, antimilitary British public had refused to spend money in the 1930s on maintaining and modernizing the British army, navy and air force". It could also be noted that the American government limited spending on re-arming after WWI. This could also be partly attributed to public opinion against rearmament, partly as a result of the hardships inflicted by WWI. In blaming the public, rather than the leaders of Great Britain, Kennedy walked a middle line. Logevall noted that Kennedy did not cast blame on either Chamberlain or Churchill for their leadership, but observed the need for future generations to maintain a powerful military, a theme he took into his public life and presidency. Kennedy showed his early understanding of moderation and diplomacy by offering the view that rearming Britain in the 1920s and 1930s would have been expedient, without criticizing the members of Parliament who failed to take this course.

=== PT-109 ===
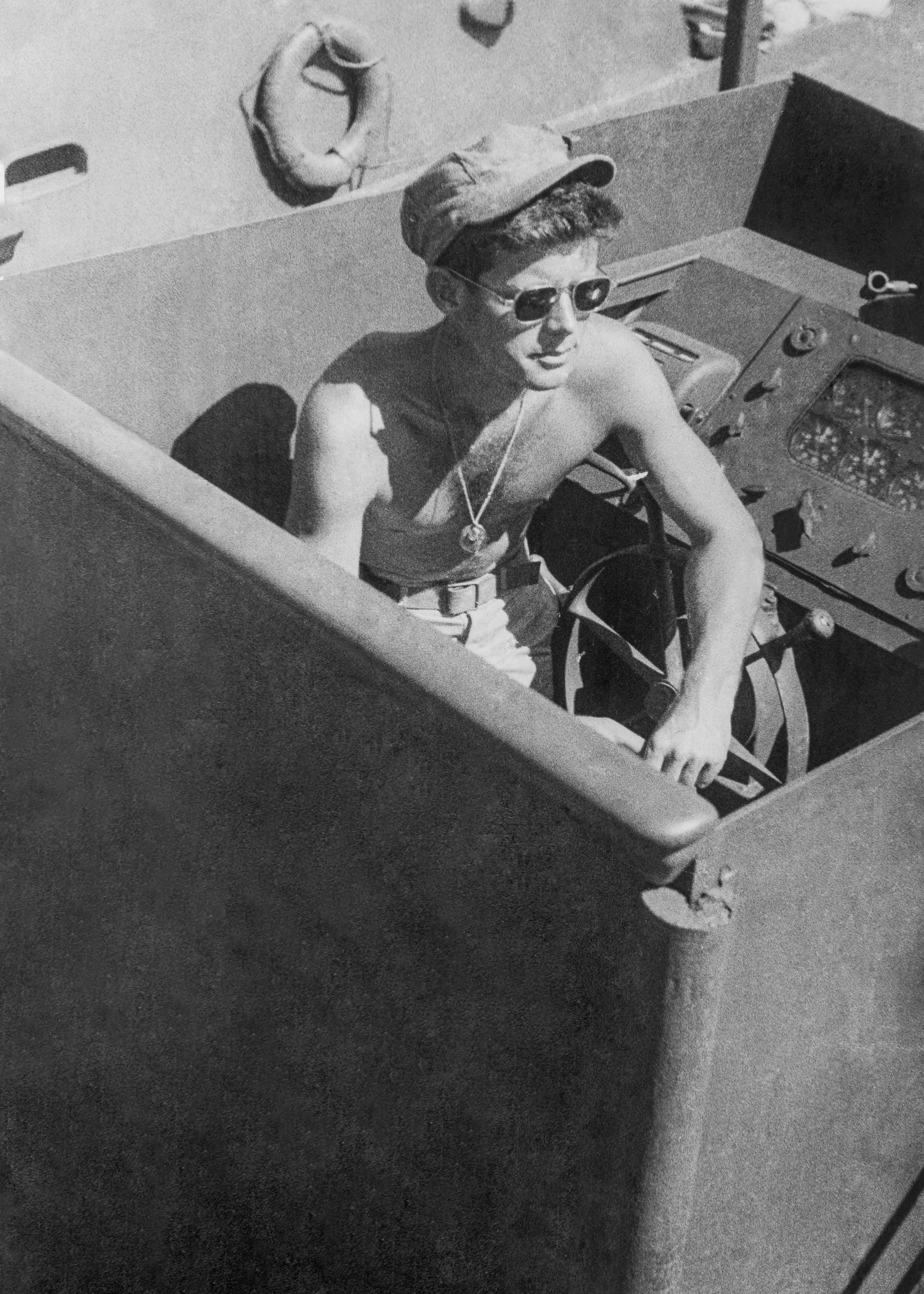
LTJG John F. Kennedy aboard PT-109, 1943

Kennedy's service as commander of the doomed PT-109 demonstrated his leadership abilities, but according to Logevall also gave indications that at an early age, Kennedy knew how to use contacts, persuasion, and finesse to meet his political objectives. As he strongly felt the need for America to enter the war, he summoned his political skills to further that aim. After being stuck with a safe posting at the Panama Canal after completion of his PT training, Kennedy desperately sought a combat assignment. As Logevall noted, Kennedy, using his own political pull, contacted family friend and crony Massachusetts senator David I. Walsh, chairman of the Naval Affairs Committee, who diverted his assignment to Panama, and had him sent to PT combat in the Solomon Islands, granting Kennedy's previous "change-of-assignment" request to be sent to a squadron in the South Pacific. His actions were against the wishes of his father who had wanted a safer assignment.

Several historians and military strategists have blamed Kennedy for idling the PT-109's engines during the Battle of Blackett Strait in the Solomon Islands, which caused him to momentarily lose full control of his ship in enemy waters as the primary cause of the ramming that sunk the 109. Kennedy's superior officer, Commander Warfield, who planned the mission, believed Kennedy temporarily idling all three of his engines was the reason he could not rapidly maneuver PT-109 out of range of the oncoming Japanese destroyer Amagiri in time to prevent the collision. Kennedy claimed later that stopping the boat by idling the engines reduced its visibility to the low flying enemy planes that could see the phosphorescent wake of his vessel, the PT-109, as it moved through the ocean. In fact, Kennedy believed the wake created a path directly to the stern of the PT-109 to the enemy planes that had been sighted that night prior to the collision, and had already dropped bombs that had rocked the 109.

Logevall accurately describes Kennedy's ordeal after the ramming of the 109 by the Japanese destroyer Amagiri, and notes that the darkness, and an inability to communicate effectively by radio contributed to the loss of Kennedy's ship, as there were no visual cues of where the enemy was. Kennedy's 109 had no radar in mid-1943 when she was sunk in August. But he omits the observation of William Doyle in his book, PT-109, that serious issues with the PT-109's Mark VIII torpedoes played a critical role in the ineffectiveness of using PT boats against Japanese destroyers, which were over 200 feet longer, better armed, and had both a longer gun range, and more effective torpedoes. Doyle also noted that a mis-calculation in the Mark VIII torpedo caused them frequently to fail to explode on impact. Logevall may have omitted details of the ineffectiveness of the Mark VIII torpedoes, as it is quite possible Kennedy was unaware that the torpedoes were partly responsible for the failure of his mission on August 2 in Blackett Strait.

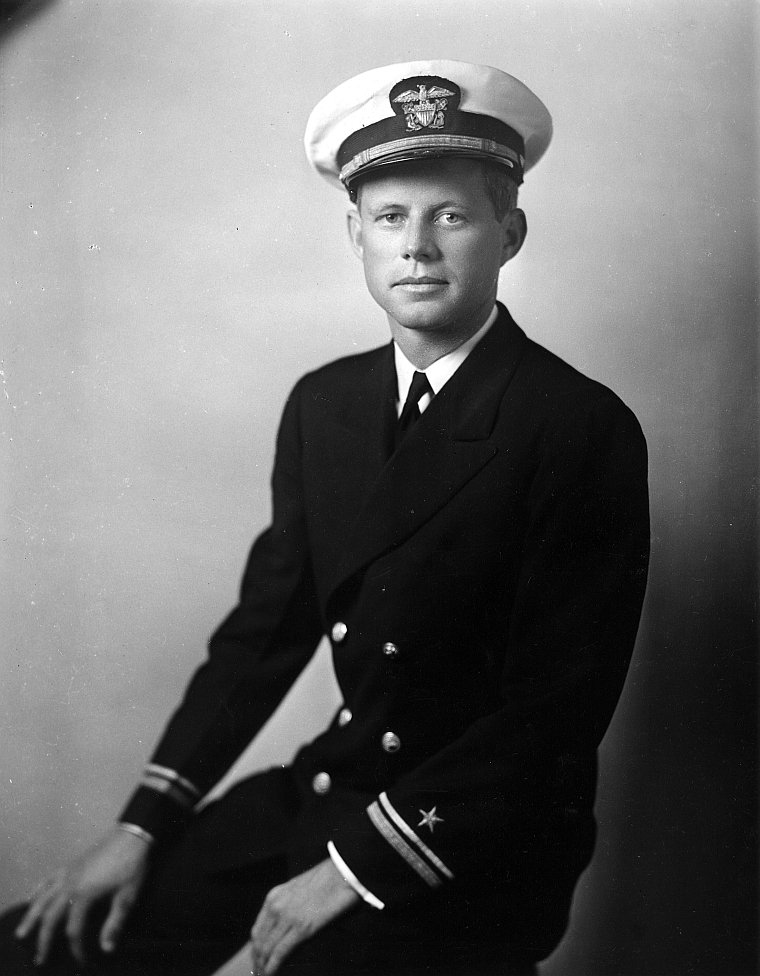
Kennedy, naval photo, 1942

His disastrous experience after the sinking of the PT-109 left him exhausted, badly underweight, with a seriously disabled lower back, and mourning over the loss of two shipmates under his command. Disillusioned with the brutality and futility of war, he wrote, "I should really like as my life's goal—in some way and at some point, to do something to help prevent another." Logevall believed the statement may have revealed Kennedy's early desire to make a mark in public life, and sharpened his doubts about the utility of war, particularly after he witnessed the birth of nuclear weapons in 1945. Logeval indicated that Kennedy's wariness of the effectiveness of high-ranking military decisions in the midst of encountering the enemy in the PT-109 incident may have contributed to his distrust of a purely military solution to the Cuban missile crisis. According to Logevall, it also influenced him to move for the successful completion of the Nuclear Test Ban Treaty in August 1963 which was a step towards limiting Russia's production of nuclear weapons. Logevall also noted that Kennedy's disastrous experience with the ineffectiveness of military planning and decision-making during the sinking of the PT-109 at the Battle of Blackett Strait may have influenced Kennedy to find a diplomatic, rather than military solution to the Cuban Missile Crisis.

=== Early views on the Cold War, 1945 ===
Around April 1945, after JFK had left the Navy and completed a period of physical recovery, Joe Kennedy obtained a brief position for his son JFK as journalist with two Hearst-owned newspapers. Hearst was a personal friend and acquaintance of Kennedy's father. For the Chicago Herald-American, and New York's Journal American, Jack covered the upcoming United Nations conference in San Francisco. He later covered the British elections for the Hearst papers, and was surprised by Churchill's defeat against the Labor Party. Realizing the larger powers, particularly Russia, might dominate post-war Europe, he wrote of the United Nations that "with its elaborate mechanics, the organization would prove ineffectual in resolving the great issues of war and peace, especially given that the larger countries would refuse to entrust it with sufficient decision-making powers." He would also write "There is growing discouragement among people concerning our chances of winning any lasting peace from this war." and "There is talk of fighting the Russians in the next ten or fifteen years". Writing for the United Nations conference, he noted that in the absence of a meaningful settlement between the two countries, "Soviet-American relations would quickly worsen," and that, "the political battle would go on and spread to Asia".

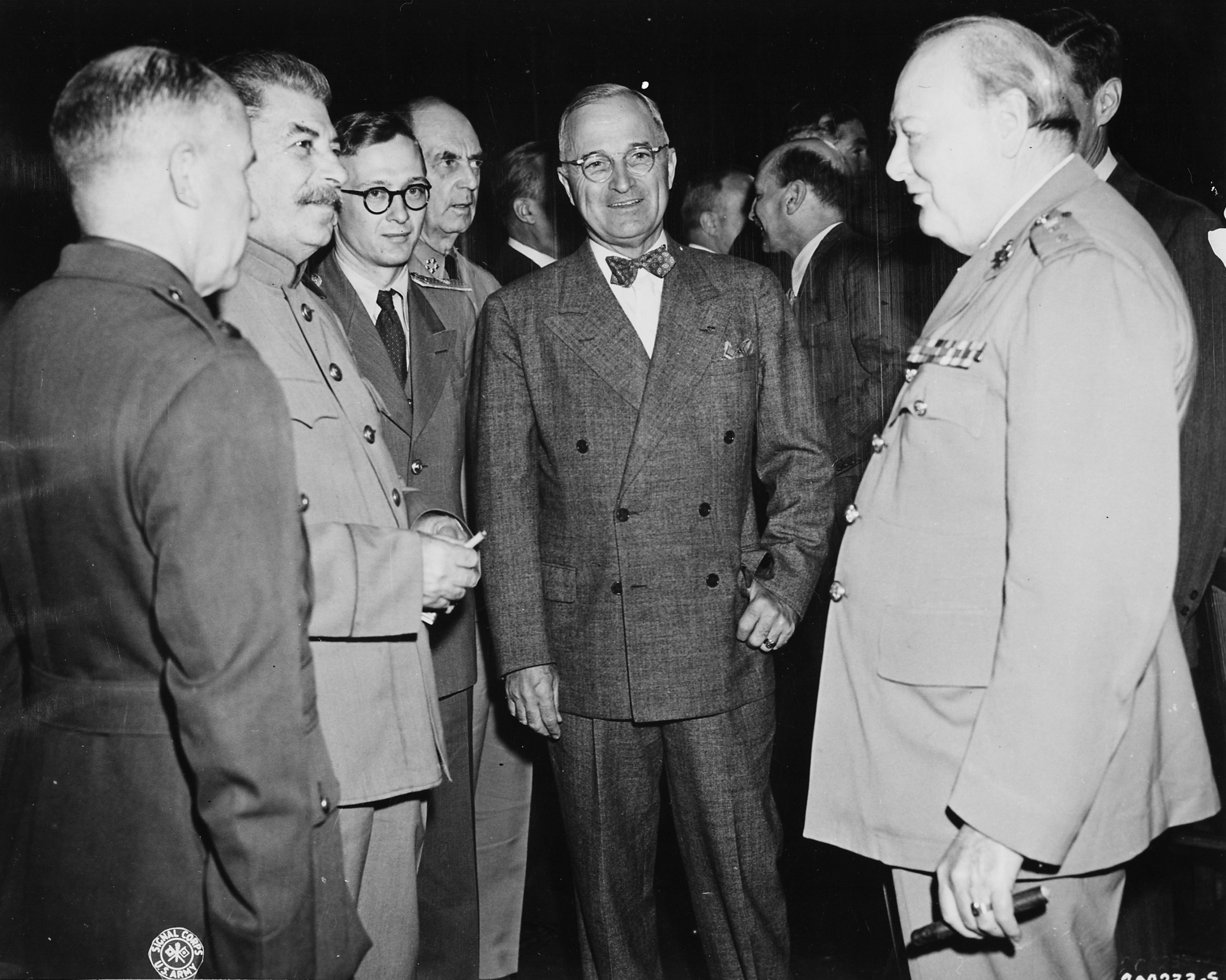
Stalin, Truman, and Churchill in Potsdam, July 1945

While still working for Hearst, young Kennedy visited Berlin, and predicting Russia's eventual rise to power, or at least the threat of her occupying West Berlin, he wrote in his journal, "One opinion here is that the Russians are never going to pull out their zone of occupation but plan to make their part of Germany a Soviet Socialist Republic...if we don't withdraw and allow the Germans to administer their own affairs, we will be confronted with an extremely difficult administrative problem. Yet, if we pull out, we may create a political vacuum that the Russians will be only too glad to fill". Though not allowed to attend the Postsam convention, held in a suburb of Berlin in July and August 1945, he met or came in close contact with President Harry Truman, listened carefully to Allied commander Dwight Eisenhower, saw Army Chief of Staff George C. Marshall, and briefly met with or encountered a number of high-level state department officials including W. Averell Harriman, Charles Bohlen, John McCloy, Robert Murphy, and William Clayton. JFK traveled with James Forrestal, who was acting Secretary of the Navy, and who later attempted to recruit him for additional work with the Navy. These experiences, according to Logevall, helped broaden JFK's knowledge of the international climate prior to the height of the Cold War.

Later, as an early candidate for the House of Representatives in 1946, Kennedy expressed his support for the tough policy against Russian expansionism integral to Truman's administration, when he stated in a radio address, "The years ahead will be difficult and strained, the sacrifices great, but it is only by supporting with all our hearts the course we believe to be right, can we prove that that course is not only right, but that it has strength and vigor." Logevall and the New York Times reviewer of his Kennedy biography indicated that Kennedy's early life experience as skipper of the PT-109 that resulted in his disillusionment with the effectiveness of purely military decisions in times of crisis could be seen, in some part, as a prelude to his American University address in June 1963, "where he urged a realistic reappraisal of the Cold War and laid the foundations for the hotly contested policy that became known as détente".

=== House of Representatives, 1946 ===
Logevall noted that Kennedy's father Joseph was quite helpful in coordinating media coverage for JFK during his first run for the national office of the Eleventh District Massachusetts's House of Representatives in 1946, though the official title of Campaign Manager was held by Mark Dalton. JFK's personality and long hours campaigning were likely the deciding factor in his victory, nonetheless. According to Logevall, "Joe spent hours on the phone with reporters and editors, seeking information, trading confidences, and cajoling them into publishing puff pieces on Jack, ones that invariably played up his war record in the Pacific. He oversaw a professional advertising campaign that insured ads went up in just the right places—the campaign had a virtual monopoly on subway space, and on window stickers for cars and homes—and was the force behind the mass mailings of Hersey's PT 109 article". The campaign also used billboards effectively. Campaign manager Mark Dalton estimated spending around $50,000, a considerable sum, but not as exorbitant as some opponents may have later estimated.

=== Europe and Asia, Fall 1951 ===
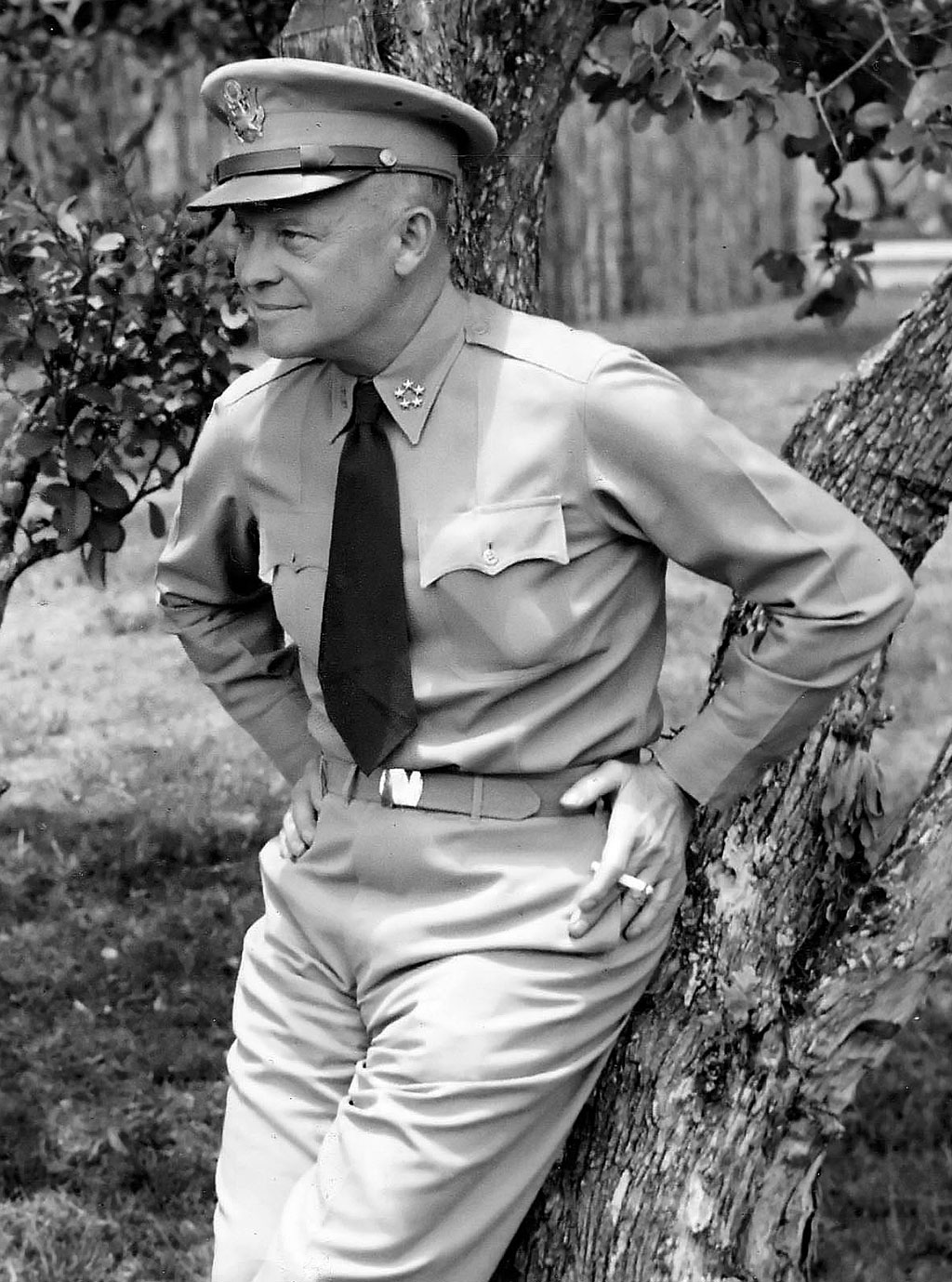
Eisenhower, 1945

In a trip to Europe and Asia in the fall of 1951, Kennedy gained valuable insight into post-war global politics, strengthening his international relations credentials shortly before his first run for the Senate. He visited France, Israel, Iran, Pakistan, India, Singapore, Thailand, Indonesia, French Indochina, Malaya, Burma, Korea, and Japan. Arriving first in France, he met with General Dwight D. Eisenhower at Supreme Headquarters in Paris. In Israel, he was impressed with the leadership of Prime Minister David Ben Gurion and concerned about the status of Arab refugees. He met President Mossadegh in Iran, whom he correctly speculated would have a long stay in power, countering the opinion of less insightful British officials. In Pakistan, he met with Prime Minister Ali Khan, shortly before his assassination, and in India was impressed with Jawaharlal Nehru and Indira Gandhi. Nehru was one of the first to advise him of the futility of the war against Ho Chi Minh in Viet Nam. Lastly, he met with the prime minister of Thailand before arriving in Viet Nam, where he wrote "the American people should avoid the path trod by the declining British and French empires, and instead show that the enemy is not merely Communism, but "poverty and want", "sickness and disease", and "injustice and inequality". Perhaps demonstrating a better understanding of Vietnam under French rule than his successor Lyndon Baines Johnson, Kennedy further noted, "There is no broad support of the native Viet Nam government among the people of that area", for it is a "puppet government", and "a free election would go in favor of Ho and his Communists". For those that believe these observations would have prevented him from favoring increased military support of South Vietnam, many historians have questioned if Kennedy, with his wariness of communist expansionism, might not have eventually supported increasing American military intervention in Viet Nam.

=== McCarthy and emerging Cold War politics ===
Joseph McCarthy, 1954

After returning from his 1951 trip to Europe and Asia, Kennedy was confronted with the emerging popularity of Joseph McCarthy, a fellow Catholic and longtime family friend. Logevall noted that Kennedy faced the dilemma of realizing that communism could not be effectively contained through military action as suggested by McCarthy, yet remained fully aware that the anti-communist passions inspired by McCarthy would influence voting trends in the next election. McCarthy had resoundingly criticized Truman for firing General Douglas MacArthur as the military commander in Korea, and had venomously criticized George C. Marshall, believing his funding of aid to rebuild post-war Europe on behalf of the Truman Doctrine had only encouraged Soviet expansionism and resulted in strengthening and encouraging the growth of communist China under Mao. According to Logevall, Kennedy believed strongly McCarthy's attacks against alleged communists in the state department were irrational, but knew that containing communism was a complex issue that would require diplomacy and economic aid. Logevall wrote that Kennedy was hesitant to openly oppose McCarthy due to his sound public support. Kennedy distanced himself and was understandably criticized by some liberal Democrats for abstaining from the vote to censor McCarthy on December 2, 1954. Logevall noted that Kennedy's not appearing for the vote may have been a result of his being hospitalized after back surgery on the date the vote was taken. The vote, which made McCarthy one of only a few senators to ever be censored in the same manner passed comfortably 67–22, without Kennedy's support. Kennedy's failure to extend a vote to censure remained a political liability for several years, particularly among the left wing of the Democratic party.

=== RFK and the 1952 Senate run ===
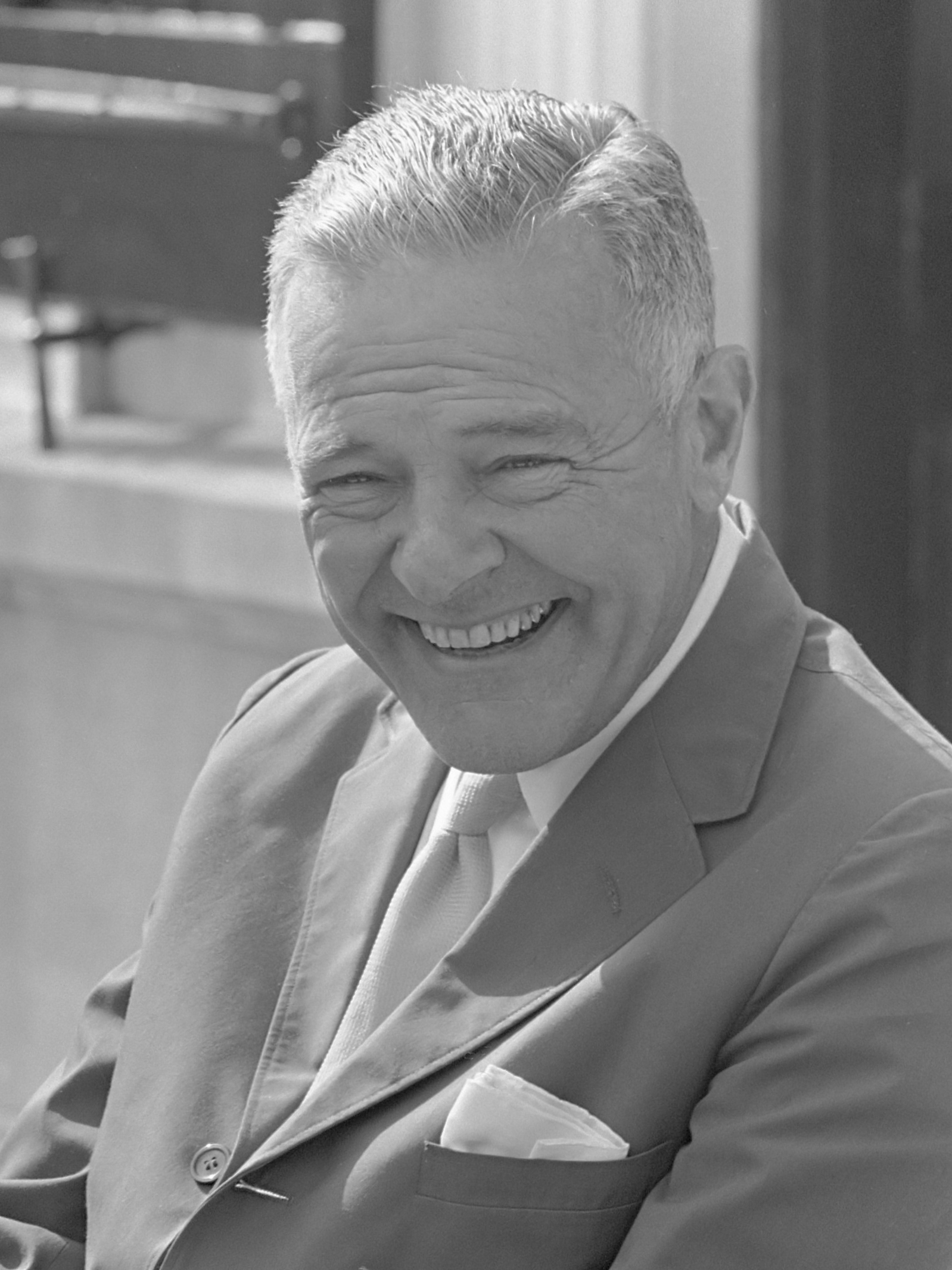
Lodge, 1964

Logevall describes the reasons behind Kennedy's successful run for the Senate in 1952 against Henry Cabot Lodge Jr., noting the invaluable part played by his campaign manager and brother Robert Kennedy, who had just graduated University of Virginia law school, and was at first reluctant to throw himself into the political race. According to Logevall, Robert was "deemed ruthless, caustic, relentless, defiant, and ferocious", in his support of the campaign, though by most accounts he proved to be quite effective. Robert created an organizational structure that had campaign "secretaries" function as "shadow units" to the regular Democratic Party machinery. A total of 286 of these Kennedy secretaries, who had no previous political allegiance to the state Democratic party, would work on Kennedy's behalf along with approximately twenty thousand volunteers.

Robert improved upon the 2,500 signatures required to get on the ballot, and reached a remarkable total of 262,324. He then used the novel idea proposed by campaign aid David Powers of having volunteers, often women, write thank-you notes to each of the signatories, and wherever possible to hand-deliver them to cut postage costs, and increase personal impact. During this successful campaign against a far more seasoned and experienced senatorial candidate, Kennedy began campaigning earlier, scored well in two late campaign televised debates, and through the use of teas often attended by his mother and sisters, reached approximately 70,000 women voters who may not have formerly been as engaged in politics.

Though both Lodge and Kennedy were seen by voters as intelligent candidates who discussed the issues well and avoided negative campaigning, Kennedy campaigned longer and may have conducted a more thorough public relations effort providing free copies of PT-109 articles to voters, and more broadly using the print media, often with the financial backing of Joseph Kennedy. Logevall came to the important conclusion as to the level of JFK's sole responsibility and independence from the judgments of his father, noting, "That the two Kennedys often agreed on...big ticket items should not obscure the reality, which had already emerged well before 1952: John F. Kennedy, keen student of government and history, was always his own political boss. He trusted his own political judgments over those of his father, who was a whiz at making money but lacked a feel for what made people tick. The two of them saw....U.S. democracy differently. Whenever, in an election campaign, these views clashed, Jack's prevailed."

=== Ted Sorensen, speech writer and strategist ===
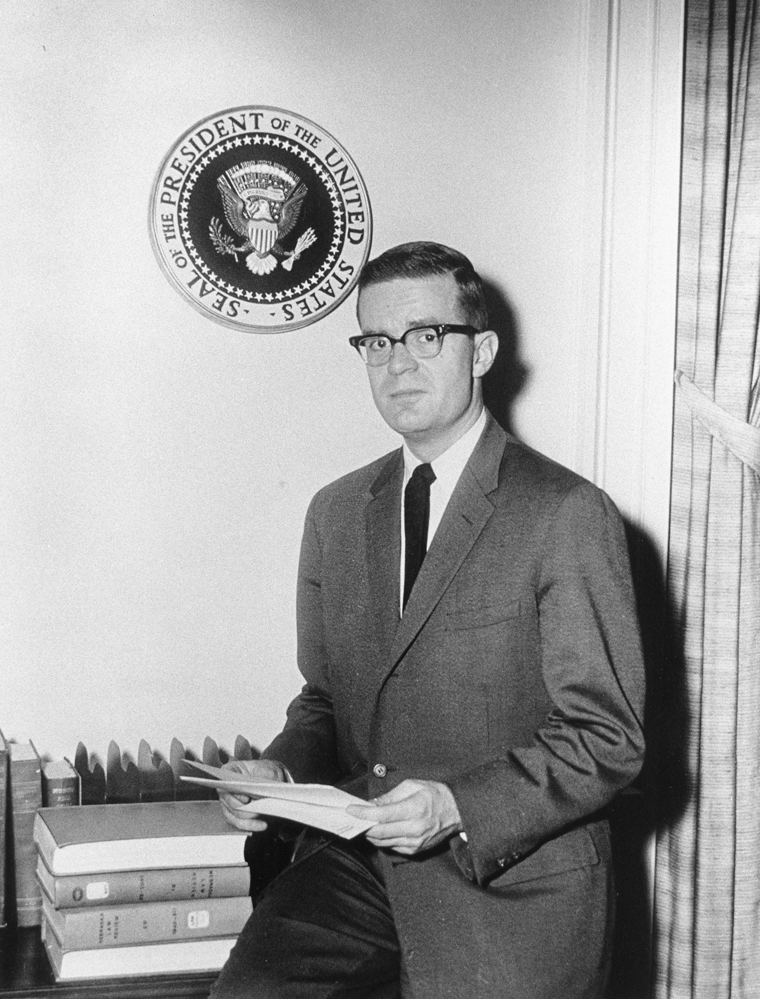
Sorensen, c. 1962

As a young senator picking his future staff around 1953, Kennedy chose Ted Sorensen, who would become his primary speech writer, and the primary author of Profiles in Courage. Logevall indicated strongly, at least as far as articulating Kennedy's vision and strategy, that Sorensen was the true power behind the throne. Reiterating a theme he made throughout JFK, Logevall identified the trait Kennedy found most important in Sorensen's own self-evaluation, "The liberal who is rationally committed is more reliable than the liberal who is emotionally committed." Not surprisingly, the ability to base political decisions on objective intellect rather than passion may have been what Logevall considered Kennedy's most distinguishing and empowering political asset.

=== Profiles in Courage 1954–5 ===
Sorensen himself often wrote and stated in interviews that he should have been given more credit for his role in writing Profiles in Courage. Despite criticism from a number of journalists who believed Kennedy should not have claimed sole authorship for Profiles due to Sorensen's extensive contributions, Logevall wrote that in several ways Kennedy may have played the more essential role in the book, noting importantly that "Kennedy made the final choices about which figures (senators) to feature in the book. And although Sorensen took the lead role in drafting the bulk of the chapters, with significant input on most of them from Georgetown University Professor of Diplomatic history Jules Davids, and Harvard Law Dean and economist James M. Landis, the senator (Kennedy) was responsible for the book's architecture, themes, and arguments." Landis, an associate of Joseph Kennedy Sr., would later act as special counsel during Kennedy's term as president. Certainly, many Kennedy critics have understandably disputed this finding, often with the support of Sorensen. Kennedy, who may have been primarily responsible for the content of about a quarter of the volume, contributed most to the first and the last chapters, according to Logevall, as well as a large portion of Chapter 2 on John Quincy Adams. He also wrote the Introduction, which laid out some of the book's central theme, which centered on Kennedy's hope that as legislators and perhaps even citizens, "We can compromise our political positions but not ourselves. We can resolve the clash of interests without conceding our ideals". He went on to write, "compromise need not mean cowardice. Indeed, it is frequently the compromisers and conciliators who are faced with the severest tests of political courage as they oppose the extremist views of their constituents, as their loyalty to the nation triumphs over all personal considerations".

Logevall went on to add that Sorensen, though a highly capable writer, as a political novice did not have Kennedy's ability to reflect on the importance and place of compromise in political life, nor was he as knowledgeable about American history as Kennedy. According to Logevall, and attested to by both Jackie Kennedy, and many friends, Kennedy worked for many weeks on the book during his long and painful recovery from back surgery, noting, "often he worked while prone in bed, on heavy white paper in his loose, widely spaced hand; on better days he was propped up on the patio or the porch." Further, Kennedy played a highly active role in initially locating research sources, for "on an almost daily basis, Sorensen recalled, Kennedy sent him instructions about "books to ship down, memoranda to prepare, sources to check, materials to assemble." Kennedy instructed Sorensen to scan more than two hundred books, journals, magazines, (and) congressional records. Sorensen later noted, "the way Jack worked was to take all the material, mine and his, pencil it, dictate the fresh copy in his own words, pencil it again, he never used a typewriter". Despite Logevall's contention that Kennedy made the more significant contribution to the contents of the book, it is still accurate to note that Sorensen wrote more of the final draft, and publicly stated in the media that he believed he deserved more of the credit for the book.

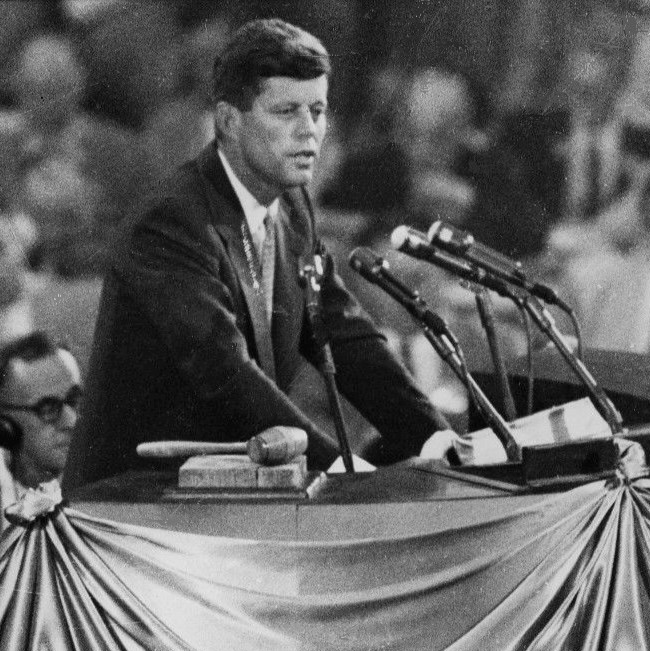
Kennedy endorsing Adlai Stevenson II for the presidential nomination in 1956

=== Vice-presidential run, 1956 ===
The book ends with Kennedy's unsuccessful run for the vice-presidential nomination under what would become the failed presidential candidacy of Adlai Stevenson II who had the misfortune of running against the exceptionally popular incumbent Dwight Eisenhower in 1956. Logevall would note that it may have been beneficial for Kennedy's future political career that he was not chosen as vice-president by Stevenson. The experience gave Kennedy his first taste of national politics, and began self-speculation that he might someday have a larger impact on the world stage.

== Critical reviews ==
David Kennedy of the New York Times Book Review writes that after a careful study of Kennedy's prep school and college essays, and an analysis of his Harvard senior thesis, Why England Slept, "a picture emerges of an uncommonly curious, sometimes frivolous but increasingly earnest young man on his way to shaping an informed, clear-eyed, unsentimental sense of the world and his nation's place in it". He goes on to note that "John F. Kennedy's individual journey of separation from his father's isolationism tracked the progression of the United States in mid-century from peripheral international player to the singularly most dominant political and economical global power".

Evan Thomas of the Washington Post emphasized Logevall's depiction of Kennedy's centrism, pragmatism, and ability to distance himself from public opinion to remain objective as a politician. Thomas's review notes that Kennedy was "passionate about politics—an honorable profession, he believed—but he was never polemical or even terribly partisan. He knew that it could take courage to be a moderate, to find the middle way. His heroes were the politicians who compromised on policy but not principle." Thomas believed Logevall demonstrated with conviction that although Sorensen certainly improved Kennedy's writing style, spelling and grammar in Profiles in Courage, and completed the majority of the final draft, the primary themes and insights were Kennedy's.

David Runciman of the UK Guardian writes a strongly positive review, but considers John Kennedy's character to be less clearly defined than that of his powerful father or his more steely younger brother Robert. He views Joseph Senior as "dominating", "frightful" and "formidable", though he still considers Logevall to be sympathetic to his role. He notes more importantly that unlike Joseph Senior, "JFK was extraordinarily skilled at creating the right impression", but considers his character to be less clearly defined. Runsiman believes Bobby did Jack's "dirty work", and this is a role often assigned to Bobby by other less well researched authors.

Publishers Weekly notes that Logevall "writes vividly of the hothouse Kennedy family culture, but also widens his lens to take in the forces of war, politics, and television that shaped JFK's worldview and career". Their review mentions that Kennedy's portrait still feels romanticized, particularly in its portrayal of Kennedy's charisma, but the author also informs his audience of the "rich substance behind Kennedy's glamorous trappings".

== Netflix adaptation ==
In 2023, Netflix began developing a limited series based on the book, with Eric Roth writing and executive producing the show. In 2025, Michael Fassbender was announced to be playing Joseph P. Kennedy, Sr.
