= The Dancing Class =

Painting by Edgar Degas

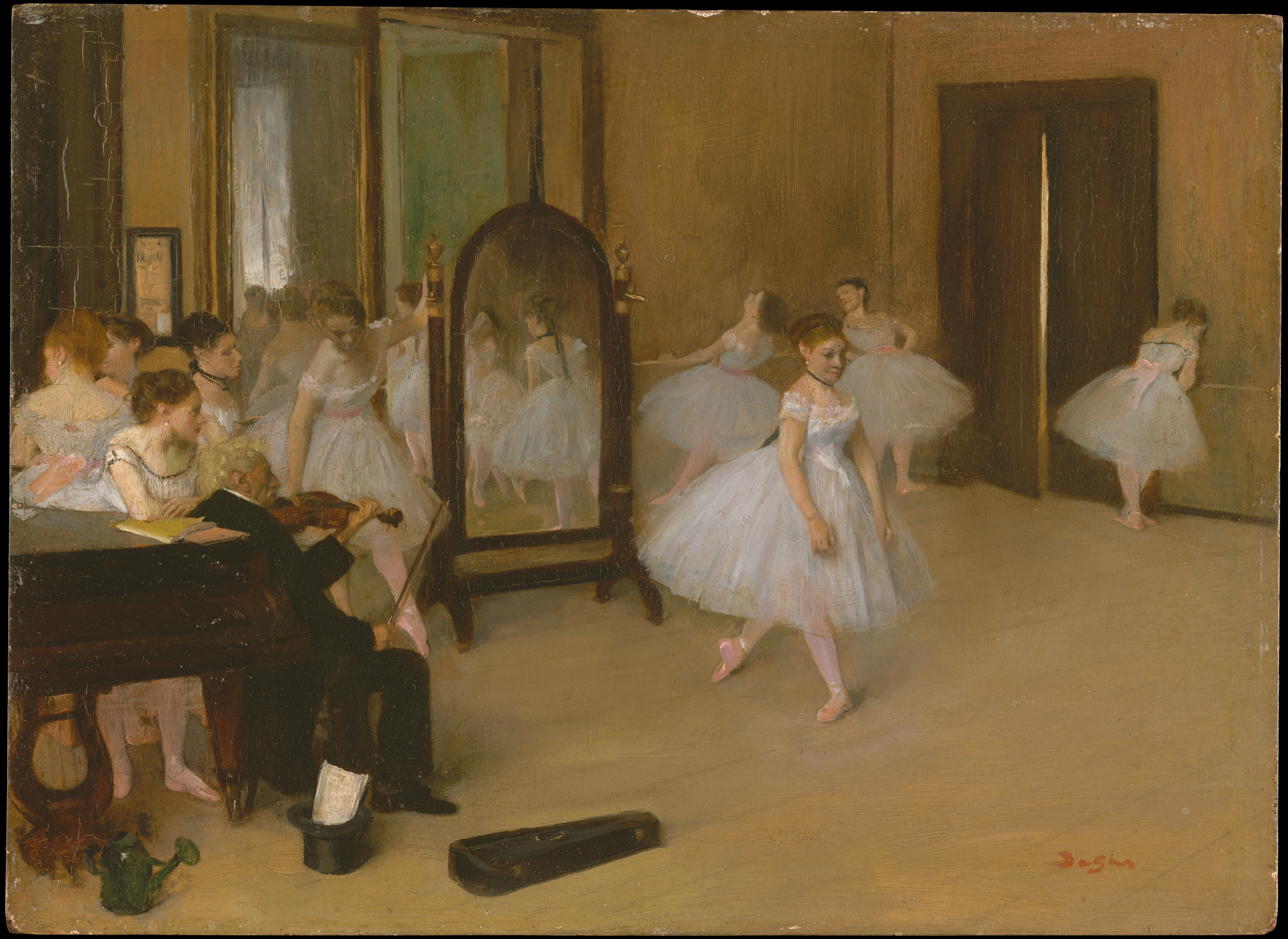
- Artist: Edgar Degas
- Year: c. 1870
- Type: oil painting on wood
- Dimensions: 19.7 cm × 27 cm (7.8 in × 11 in)
- Location: Metropolitan Museum of Art, New York

The Dancing Class is an oil painting on wood executed around 1870 by the French artist Edgar Degas. The painting depicts a dancing class at the Paris Opéra. The dancer in the center is Joséphine Gaujelin (or Gozelin). It is one of Degas's earliest classroom scenes, and it is considered foundational to the development of his ballet series. The work is known by various titles, including The Dancing Class, Dance Class, and Rehearsal Room, and it is variously dated to 1871,1872, or 1871–1872.

== Background and creation ==
The Dancing Class is one of Degas's initial attempts at depicting the rehearsal space at a time when he remained relatively unfamiliar with the environment. To make the picture, Degas relied on preparatory studies rather than creating the work in the moment. The unfamiliar presence of Degas in the practice room may have led to the dancers to appear stiff and self-conscious. This early stiffness in The Dancing Class is often contrasted with the more relaxed and fluid forms of the dancers in his future, more intimate works.

== Composition and style ==
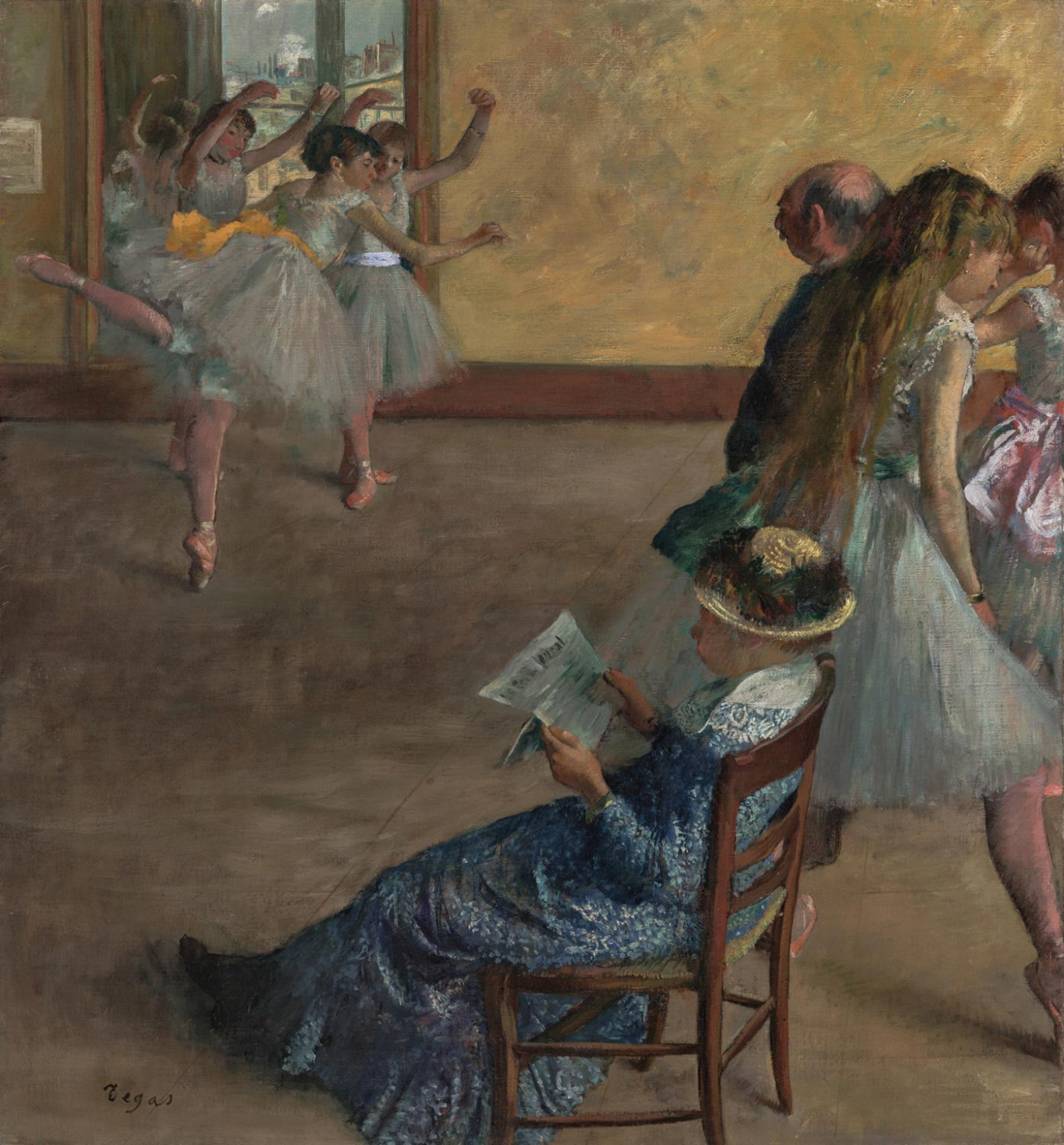
Degas, The Ballet Class, c. 1880. Mari Kálmán Meller observes that this work demonstrates Degas's use of similar motifs throughout his ballet series. It includes a large mirror first seen in The Dancing Class.

The Dancing Class has been seen as a template for Degas's later classroom scenes. It is the first work in the series to introduce several motifs that would become central to his ballet paintings, including the barre, the reflective mirrors, and the bare floorboards. Mari Kálmán Meller notes that the picture shares with the later ballet scenes a "highly-articulated architectural setting." Degas frequently used architectural structures and careful placement of figures to control the viewers gaze and impression a scene. Scholars have attributed the spatial arrangement and composition of this scene to the influence of the Spanish master Velázquez.

== Critical reception ==
Critics offered a mix of responses to The Dancing Class when it was first exhibited in 1874. The critic Marc de Montifaud described the work as "a fine, profound study from which emerges that which one would never encounter in the work of certain genre painters who would blush to put undraped figures in a canvas of only a few inches' in size: the study of woman in all her opulent nudity, of her elegant or thin anatomical lines." Emphasizing the erotic character of the work, Montifaud related the figures to the act of "seduction." Other critics saw the work as more incoherent than erotic, emphasizing the angular and supposedly disjointed appearance of the figures.

== Interpretation and themes ==
Scholars have often interpreted the work in relation to the social and historical context of late nineteenth-century Paris, treating it as consistent with Degas's commitment to documenting modern life. Eunice Lipton suggests that Degas's images of dancers resonate with contemporary issues of class, sex, and work. According to Lipton, Degas's depiction of intimate moments like stretching, practicing, and resting made public what was intensely private. Degas, Lipton suggests, was able to bring his middle class audience into spaces they could not view themselves, "titillating his bourgeois audience." Carol Armstrong notes that Degas counterbalances the depiction of dancers as a desirable object of eroticism with their portrayal as a realistic subject of social documentation.

Scholars have also observed that the picture is notable for including a male musician. In Degas's later works he neglected to include males as a rejection of "sexual confrontation" and as a step towards painting "gender-specific subjects."

== See also ==
- The Ballet Class
