= Kennedy (upcoming TV series) =

Upcoming American historical series about Kennedy Family

- Genre: Historical drama
- Created by: Sam Shaw
- Based on: JFK: Coming of Age in the American Century, 1917–1956 by Fredrik Logevall
- Starring: Michael Fassbender; Laura Donnelly; Nick Robinson; Joshuah Melnick
- Country of origin: United States
- Original language: English

Production
- Executive producers: Sam Shaw; Peter Chernin; Jenno Topping; Kaitlin Dahill; Eric Roth; Fredrik Logevall; Lila Byock; Anya Epstein; Dustin Thomason; Thomas Vinterberg; Anna O'Malley
- Production company: Chernin Entertainment

Original release
- Network: Netflix

Kennedy is an upcoming American historical drama television series made by Netflix. The series is based on JFK: Coming of Age in the American Century, (1917–1956) by Fredrik Logevall, who also serves as an executive producer.

== Premise ==
The series centers around the Kennedy family, and starts with the rise of Joe and Rose Kennedy in the 1930s.

== Cast ==
=== Main ===
- Michael Fassbender as Joseph P. Kennedy Sr.
- Laura Donnelly as Rose Kennedy
- Nick Robinson as Joe Kennedy Jr.
- Joshuah Melnick as Jack Kennedy

=== Recurring ===
- Ben Miles as Eddie Moore
- Lydia Peckham as Rosemary Kennedy
  - Tipper Seifert-Cleveland as young Rosemary
- Saura Lightfoot-Leon as Kick Kennedy
  - Miley Locke as young Kick
- Cole Doman as Lem Billings
- Imogen Poots as Gloria Swanson
- Georgina Bitmead as Eunice Kennedy
- Hera Hilmar as Inga Arvad
- Wyatt Russell as Charles Lindbergh
- Patrick Fischler as Arthur Krock
- Caitlin FitzGerald as Clare Boothe Luce
- Louis Landau as Billy Cavendish
- Robin Soans as Neville Chamberlain
- Denis O’Hare as Raymond Furness
- Albert Welling as Winston Churchill
- Toby Huss as Franklin D. Roosevelt
- Eddie Marsan as J. Edgar Hoover

== Production ==
In 2023, Variety reported that Netflix was developing a series based on Fredrik Logevall's book JFK: Coming of Age in the American Century, with Eric Roth set to write the script and Chernin Entertainment producing. In 2025, Netflix announced that the show was being produced and that Sam Shaw would be the showrunner, with Michael Fassbender portraying Joe Kennedy Sr. Danish filmmaker Thomas Vinterberg is set to direct and executive produce the series.

In January 2026, it was announced that Laura Donnelly, Nick Robinson, and Joshuah Melnick joined the series as series regulars, while Ben Miles, Lydia Peckham, Saura Lightfoot-Leon, Cole Doman, and Imogen Poots were cast in recurring roles. In March Georgina Bitmead, Miley Locke, Tipper Seifert-Cleveland, Hera Hilmar, Wyatt Russell, Patrick Fischler, Caitlin FitzGerald, Louis Landau, Robin Soans, Denis O’Hare, Albert Welling, Toby Huss, and Eddie Marsan joined the series in recurring roles.

Filming in the UK took place in London in March 2026 before moving to Liverpool in April, with Water Street, Rumsford Street and Fenwick Street doubling for 1930s America.

== Release ==
The eight-episode first season will be streamed on Netflix.
