= Rachel Mesch =

American scholar

Rachel Mesch is an American scholar, academic, and writer.

== Career ==
Mesch is a scholar of French literature, history, and culture specializing in gender, women writers, feminist history, and trans identities. A specialist in nineteenth-century French literature, Dr. Mesch's main areas of research and teaching include the French novel, women writers, gender studies, visual and media culture, the French Enlightenment, and the Belle Epoque. She has published articles on women writers of the eighteenth, nineteenth, and twentieth centuries.

She earned her BA from Yale University, her MA from Columbia University and her PhD from the University of Pennsylvania. She has taught at both Barnard College and Columbia University and has been teaching at Yeshiva University in New York since 2007.

Her first book, The Hysteric's Revenge: French Women Writers at the Fin de Siècle (Vanderbilt UP 2006) considered how French women wrote about sexuality in their own novels during a time when male writers and doctors were obsessed with understanding the female body.

Her second book, Having It All in the Belle Epoque: How French Women’s Magazines Invented the Modern Woman (Stanford UP 2013), explored how two innovative publications, Femina and La Vie Heureuse, constructed a new female role model who could balance femininity with feminism.

Mesch's most recent book is Before Trans: Three Gender Stories from Nineteenth Century France, which was supported by a Public Scholar fellowship from the National Endowment for the Humanities. Before Trans presents linked biographies of three writers, Jane Dieulafoy, Rachilde, and Marc de Montifaud, who pushed the boundaries of gender identity. Their intricate, personal stories provide vital historical context for our own efforts to understand the nature of gender identity and the ways in which it might be expressed

Her writing can also be found in the LA Review of Books, Slate, Tablet magazine, Lilith, and the Wonders & Marvels history blog.

Mesch was a 2020 finalist for the American Library in Paris Book Award for Before Trans: Three Gender Stories from Nineteenth-Century France. |ref=5.

== Bibliography ==
Major published works:

- Before Trans: Three Gender Stories from Nineteenth-Century France. Stanford University Press. 2020.
- Having It All in the Belle Epoque: How French Women's Magazines Invented the Modern Woman. Stanford University Press. 2013.
- The Hysteric's Revenge: French Women Writers at the fin de siècle (Vol. 1). Vanderbilt University Press. 2006.
