= Embers of War =

2012 book by Fredrik Logevall

Embers of War: The Fall of an Empire and the Making of America's Vietnam
- First edition
- Author: Fredrik Logevall
- Genre: Non-fiction
- Publisher: Random House
- Publication date: 2012
- Publication place: United States
- Pages: 864
- ISBN: 978-0375504426

Embers of War: The Fall of an Empire and the Making of America's Vietnam is a 2012 book by historian Fredrik Logevall, then a professor at Cornell University. The book won the 2013 Pulitzer Prize for History, the inaugural American Library in Paris Book Award, and the 2013 Arthur Ross Book Award and was a runner-up for the Cundill Prize. The book covers the Vietnam conflict right from the 1919 Versailles Peace Conference till 1959, when the first American soldiers are killed in an ambush near Saigon in Vietnam, focusing on the Indochina War between France and the Viet Minh.

== Reviews ==
- Alan Brinkley. The New York Times.
- Scott Midgley. Reviews in History.
- Reilly, Brett (2016). "Review: Embers of War by Fredrik Logevall". Journal of Vietnamese Studies. 11 (1): 145–151. doi:10.1525/jvs.2016.11.1.145.
