= Fredrik Logevall =

Swedish-American historian and educator

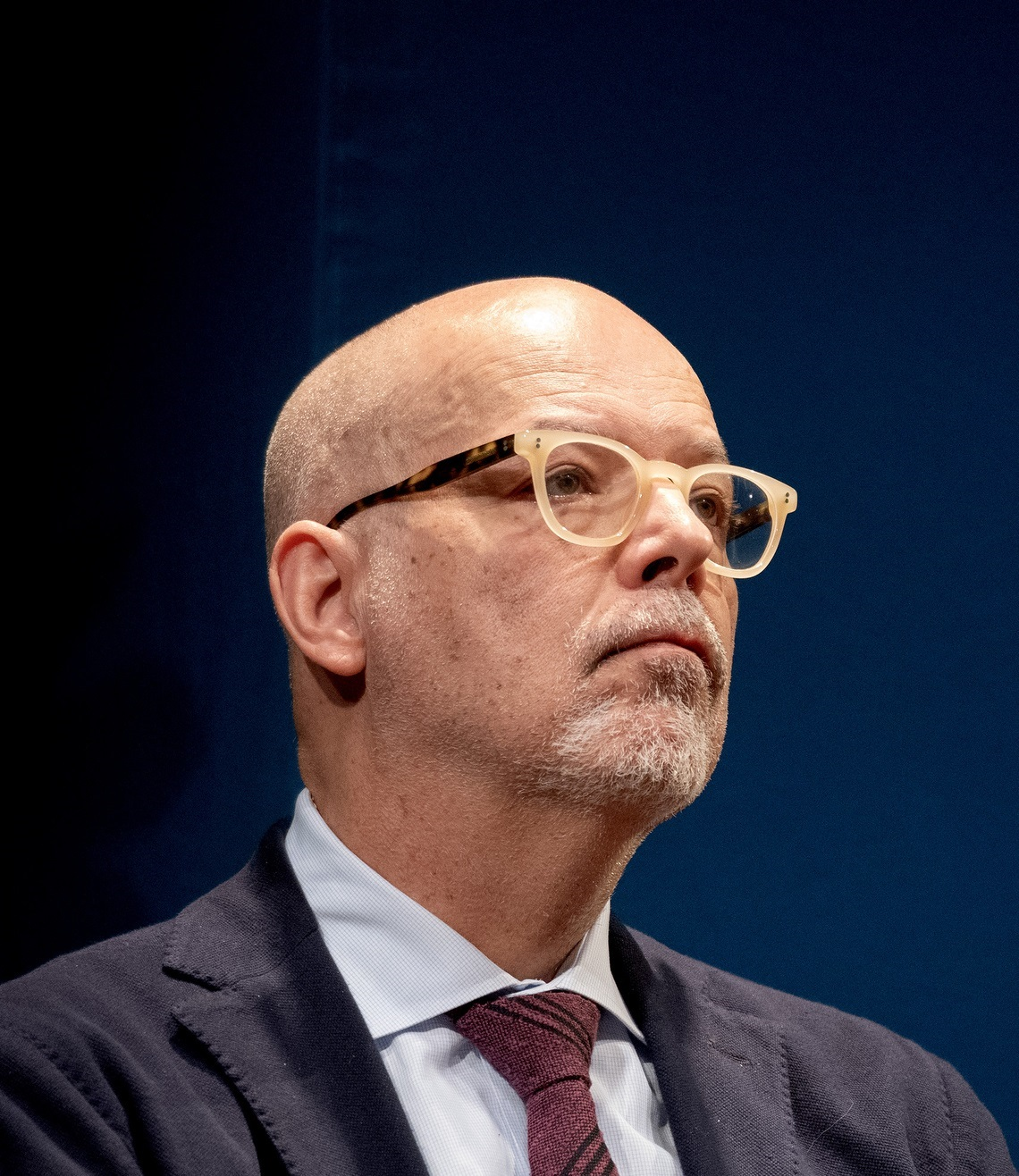
- Logevall in 2023
- Born: 1963 (age 62–63); Stockholm, Sweden
- Education: Simon Fraser University (BA); University of Oregon (MA); Yale University (PhD)
- Spouse: Danyel Logevall

Fredrik Logevall is a Swedish-American historian and educator at Harvard University, where he is the Laurence D. Belfer Professor of International Affairs at the John F. Kennedy School of Government and professor of history in the Harvard Faculty of Arts and Sciences. He is a specialist in U.S. politics and foreign policy. He won the 2013 Pulitzer Prize for History for his book Embers of War: The Fall of an Empire and the Making of America’s Vietnam. He served as a consultant to the 2017 PBS documentary series The Vietnam War by Ken Burns and Lynn Novick.

Logevall’s essays and reviews have appeared in The New York Times, The Washington Post, the Los Angeles Times, Politico, Daily Beast, and Foreign Affairs, among other publications.

== Biography ==
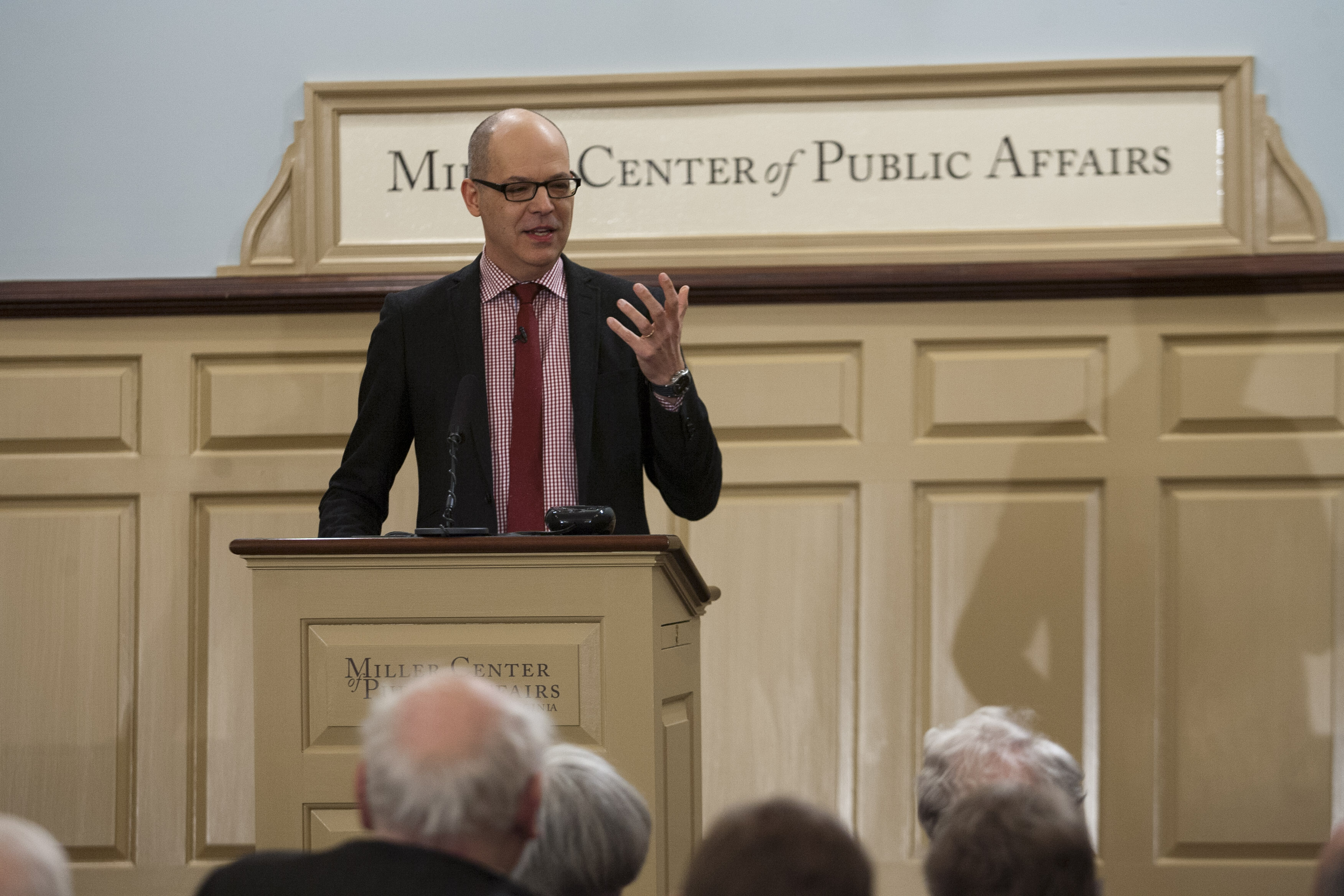
Fredrik Logevall speaks at the Miller Center of Public Affairs in 2013.

Fredrik Logevall was born in Stockholm, Sweden, in 1963, and grew up in Västerås. He emigrated with his family to Vancouver, British Columbia as a youth and before entering Simon Fraser University. He went on to earn an MA in history from the University of Oregon and a PhD in U.S. foreign relations history from Yale University, where he studied under Gaddis Smith and Paul Kennedy. He then taught for eleven years at University of California, Santa Barbara, where, with Tsuyoshi Hasegawa, he co-founded the university's Center for Cold War Studies. In 2004, he moved to Cornell University, where he became the Stephen and Madeline Anbinder Professor of History at Cornell University. He also served as vice provost and as director of the Mario Einaudi Center for International Studies. In 2015, Logevall joined the faculty at Harvard University.

In the 2010s, Logevall served as a consultant to the PBS television documentary series The Vietnam War from directors Ken Burns and Lynn Novick, with him being credited with convincing the two to provide an extensive parallel between the history of French involvement in the Vietnamese conflict and the actions taken by the United States in Vietnam in the 1960s.

In the fall of 2022, he was a Fellow at the Swedish Collegium for Advanced Study in Uppsala, Sweden and in February 2023, he delivered the annual Wittrock Lecture at the same institution. Logevall is a former president of the Society for Historians for American Foreign Relations.

In 2025, Variety reported that Logevall would be executive producing the Netflix adaptation of his ongoing three-volume biography of John F. Kennedy.

== Awards ==
Logevall has lectured widely around the world on topics relating to diplomatic history and contemporary U.S. politics and foreign policy, and has won numerous honors for his work. His book, Embers of War: The Fall of an Empire and the Making of America’s Vietnam (2012), received the Pulitzer Prize for History, the Francis Parkman Prize from the Society of American Historians, the Arthur Ross Book Award from the Council on Foreign Relations, and the American Library in Paris Book Award.

His 2020 book JFK: Coming of Age in the American Century, 1917–1956 won the Elizabeth Longford Prize for Historical Biography. In 2023, Netflix began developing a TV series on Kennedy's life based on Logevall's biography. Logevall is also a recipient of the Stuart L. Bernath book, article, and lecture prizes, the Warren F. Kuehl Book Prize (2001) from the Society for Historians of American Foreign Relations, and the W. Turrentine Jackson Book Award, Pacific Coast Branch, American Historical Association (2000).

== Selected works ==
Logevall has published numerous books and articles on U.S. foreign policy in the Cold War era, including:

- JFK: Pursuit of the Presidency, 1956-1961 (Random House, 2027).
- JFK: Coming of Age in the American Century, 1917-1956 (Random House, 2020).
- Embers of War: The Fall of an Empire and the Making of America's Vietnam (Random House, 2012). Winner of the 2013 Pulitzer Prize; finalist for the 2013 Cundill Prize in Historical Literature
- A People and A Nation: A History of the United States, 11th ed. (co-authored, Jane Kamensky et al.; Cengage, 2011).
- America's Cold War: The Politics of Insecurity (co-authored with Campbell Craig; Belknap Press of Harvard University Press, 2009; paperback February 2012).
- Nixon in the World: American Foreign Relations, 1969-1977 (co-edited, with Andrew Preston; Oxford University Press, 2008).
- The First Vietnam War: Colonial Conflict and Cold War Crisis (co-edited, with Mark A. Lawrence; Harvard University Press, 2007).
- Encyclopedia of American Foreign Policy: Studies in the Principal Movements and Ideas, revised ed. (co-edited, with Alexander DeConde and Richard Dean Burns; Scribners, 2002).
- Terrorism and 9/11: A Reader (edited; Houghton Mifflin, 2002).
- The Origins of the Vietnam War (Longman, 2001).
- Choosing War: The Lost Chance for Peace and the Escalation of War in Vietnam (University of California Press, 1999; paperback March 2001).
