= Jules Davids =

American professor and writer

Jules Davids (December 10, 1920 – December 6, 1996) was a professor of diplomatic history at the Edmund A. Walsh School of Foreign Service at Georgetown University until his retirement in 1986. A prolific author, his most famous work was undoubtedly his editorial assistance on Profiles in Courage, a surprise bestseller that won the 1957 Pulitzer Prize for biography for its author, Senator John F Kennedy. He graduated from Brooklyn College. Davids received $700 for his labors and acknowledgement in the foreword that he "materially assisted in the preparation of several chapters," but extensive revelations from many sources, including a detailed account by Jules Davids himself, establish that Davids prepared initial drafts of five of the chapters on the book.

He joined the faculty at Georgetown University in 1947. His students included future United States president Bill Clinton when Clinton was a Georgetown undergraduate in 1968, future first lady Jacqueline Kennedy, and historian Douglas Brinkley, with whom he discussed his involvement in the Kennedy book.

Davids was born in 1920 and grew up in Brooklyn, New York, and graduated from Brooklyn College. At Georgetown he was one of the most popular professors at the School of Foreign Service, where he taught a generation of future diplomats and policymakers. His own textbook of American history, America and the World of Our Time, was published by Random House in several editions in the early 1960s. A specialist in U.S.-China relations, he edited over 40 volumes that compiled all of the United States diplomatic papers with China from the inception of U.S.-China relations.

He was married for 45 years to Frances Davids of Oyster Bay, Long Island, New York, who taught 5th grade. They had two children. Davids died in 1996 after suffering for many years from Alzheimer's disease, and Frances Davids wrote a book, Living with Alzheimer's, about her role as a caregiver. One of Paul Davids' films deals to some extent with the legacy of his father: The Artist and the Shaman. He is honored every year at Georgetown by the Jules Davids medal given in his honor. His final book, which was to have been a definitive study of the life and career of W. Averell Harriman (begun with Harriman's collaboration and then continued by Davids alone) was never completed.
