= Marc de Montifaud =

French art critic and writer

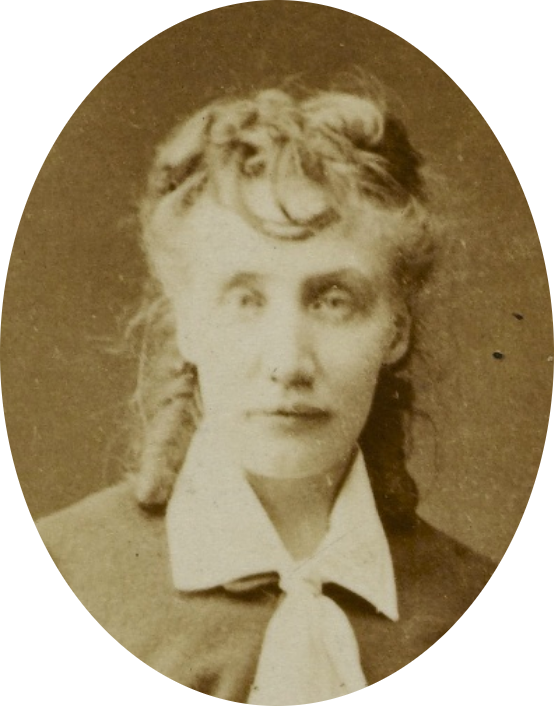
Marc de Montifaud

Marc de Montifaud (2 April 1845 – 24 September 1912), born Marie-Amélie Chartroule de Montifaud, was a French art critic and writer.

== Life and education ==
Marie-Amélie Chartroule de Montifaud was born in Paris in 1845 to Paul Chartroule de Montifaud, a physician, and a Catholic mother, Angélina Armande Charlotte d'Archies. As a child, her mother educated her in the principles of the catechism while her father, a free-thinker, introduced her to philosophy. Marc was trained in art in the studio of the painter Jean-Baptiste-Ange Tissier. At the age of 19, she married Spanish noble Juan Francis Léon de Quivogne, Comte de Luna. They had one child, Marc, born in 1874. This gender non-conforming writer as well as wife and mother, died in Neuilly-sur-Marne on 24 September 1912.

== Career ==
In 1865, at the age of 16, Montifaud began writing under the name Marc de Montifraud as an art critic for the journal L'Artiste, covering art, music and literature over a period of 12 years. One of her earliest assignments was to review the prestigious Salon, the premier annual art exhibition in Paris. Her first book, a biography of Mary Magdalene titled Les courtisanes de l'antiquite: Marie-Magdeleine, was published in 1870. She would go on to write numerous other works including poetry, plays, novels, humor, and even commentary on foreign policy in the newspaper La Fronde. Her last publication, in 1904, was a one-act patriotic drama entitled Alsace.

== Dress ==
In several photographs, Montifaud is shown wearing men's clothing and with short hair. She would dress as a man when researching at the Bibliothèque nationale and likely also dressed in men's clothing to attend the Salon and other art exhibitions in the course of her work as a critic. She used Marc and Marie interchangeably as signatures in her personal correspondence, and some friends and family alternated between referring to her with "she" or "he" pronouns. Historian Rachel Mesch suggests that this indicates that the name Marc was more than just a pseudonym for her.

== Charges of indecency ==
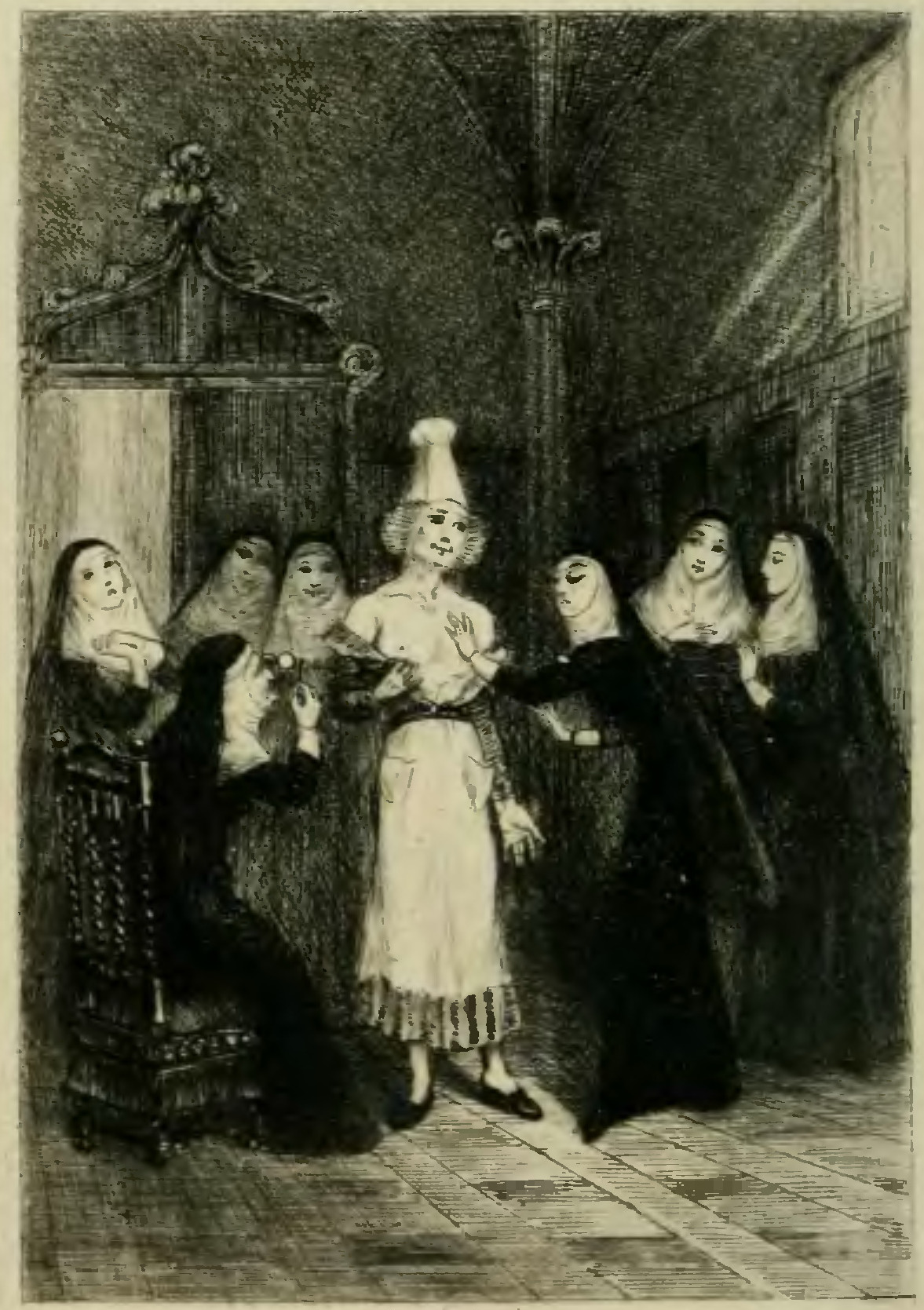
Frontispiece to Montifaud's Les Nouvelles Drolatiques, vol. 7

Montifaud did not shy away from addressing sexual themes in her writing, even in the context of histories of the church. In addition, she had a worldview that scholar Wendelin Guentner characterizes as "profoundly spiritual, though unapologetically pagan." The prevalence of such themes in her writing caused her to be condemned as pornographic or anti-clerical by the French authorities, leading to censorship of her works and legal charges of indecency. She was required to change the title of her first publication to eliminate the word "courtesans." She was fined and even imprisoned for four of her works. She was sentenced to eight days in Saint-Lazare, a women's forced-labor prison, as punishment for "offense to public decency" in her publication Alosie, or The Loves of Madame de M.T.P. (1876), a re-publication of a work by Pierre-Corneille Blessebois. She managed to escape to Brussels and was able to convince the authorities to convert the sentence into a stay in a mental hospital, Maison Dubois. The following year she published Les Vestales de l’Église (The Vestal Virgins of the Church), which earned her another sentence at Saint-Lazare, this time for three months. She once again persuaded the court to carry out the sentence at Maison Dubois. Throughout these trials, she argued that she was being treated more harshly than her male literary counterparts such as Charles Baudelaire or Gustave Flaubert who were charged with the same offense.

== Selected works ==
- Histoire d'Héloise et d'Abailard, suivie des lettres les plus mémorables des deux immortels amants, 1873
- Les Triomphes de l'Abbaye des conards, avec une notice sur la fête des fous, 1874
- Les Vestales de l'Église, 1877
- Racine et La Voisin, 1878
- Les Romantiques, 1878
- Les Dévoyés, 1879
- Madame Ducroisy, la presse et la justice, 1879
- Les Courtisanes de l'Antiquité. Marie-Magdeleine, 1879
- Les Nouvelles drolatiques, 10 vol., 1880-1881
- Entre messe et vêpres, ou les Matinées de carême au faubourg Saint-Germain, 1880-1881
- Marc de Montifaud devant l'opinion publique. Sa justification. Lettre à M. Félix Delhâsse, 1882
- Sabine, 1882
- Les Joyeuses Nouvelles, 1882
- Les Cent Nouvelles, 2 vol., 1884
- Les Folles Journées, 1884
- Monsieur Mystère, 1885
- Les Sous-officiers français, 1890
- Celles qui tuent: la baronne de Livry, 1890
- Entre messe et vêpres, 4 vol., 1894
- Un sérail à vendre, nouvelles drolatiques, 1895
- La Chaste Suzanne, nouvelles drolatiques, 1895
- Le Jugement de Paris, nouvelles drolatiques, 1898
- La Nourrice sèche, nouvelles drolatiques, 1898
- La Chair qui aime, la Chair qui tue, 1900
- La Fille de Rodin, [n. d.]
