= Leah Redmond Chang =

Author and literature scholar

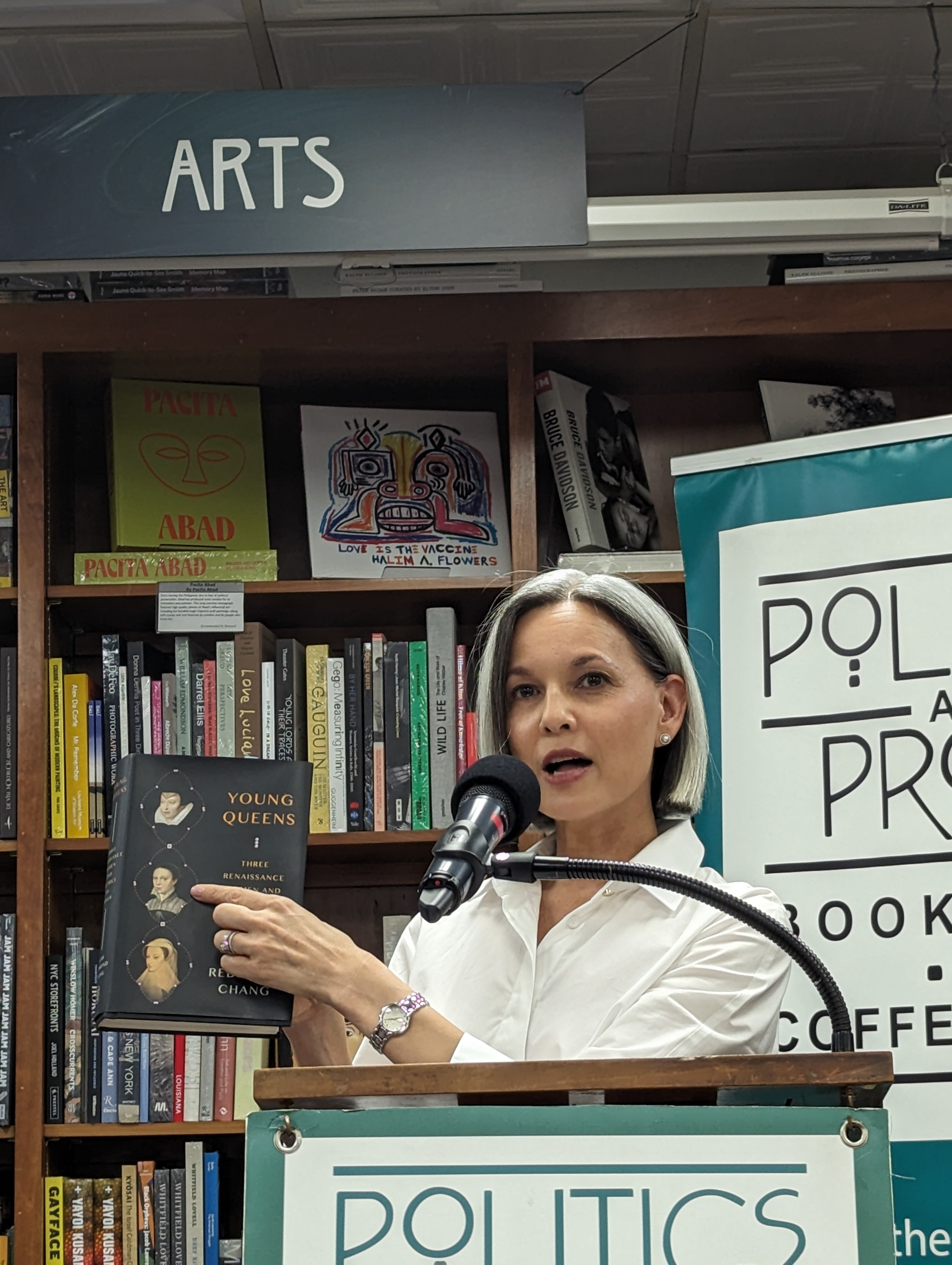
- Leah Redmond Chang at Politics and Prose
- Occupations: Author; biographer; historian; literature scholar
- Writing career
- Pen name: Leah L. Chang
- Period: 2009–present
- Subjects: Biography; history; women's history
- Website: www.leahredmondchang.com

Leah Redmond Chang is an author and literature scholar. Her works have focused on women's historical subjects including biography and literary non-fiction. She is a former associate professor of French literature and culture at the George Washington University.

Her book, Young Queens, was recognized as a Los Angeles Times Book Prize Finalist (Biography), one of the New Yorker's Best Books of 2023, one of BookRiot's Best Biography's of 2023, recognized as one of Waterstones' Best Books of the Year: History, and Longlisted for the 2024 Women's Prize in Non-Fiction.

Her early scholarly works, including Portraits of the Queen Mother and Into Print, were published under the name Leah L. Chang.

She divides her time between Washington D.C and London, UK.

== Publications ==
=== Books ===
- Young Queens: The gripping, intertwined story of three queens: Bloomsbury UK 2023
- Young Queens - Three Renaissance Women and the Price of Power: Farrar, Straus and Giroux US 2023
- Portraits of the Queen Mother: Polemics, Panegyrics, Letters: Iter Press 2014
- Into Print: The Production of Female Authorship in Early Modern France: University of Delaware Press 2009

== Articles ==
- Five Best: Books on Unsung Women wsj.com October 4, 2023
- I want readers to relate to these queens as women, to get lost in the story of Catherine, Elisabeth, and Mary bloomsbury.com May 4, 2023
