= Profiles in Courage =

1956 biographies by John F. Kennedy

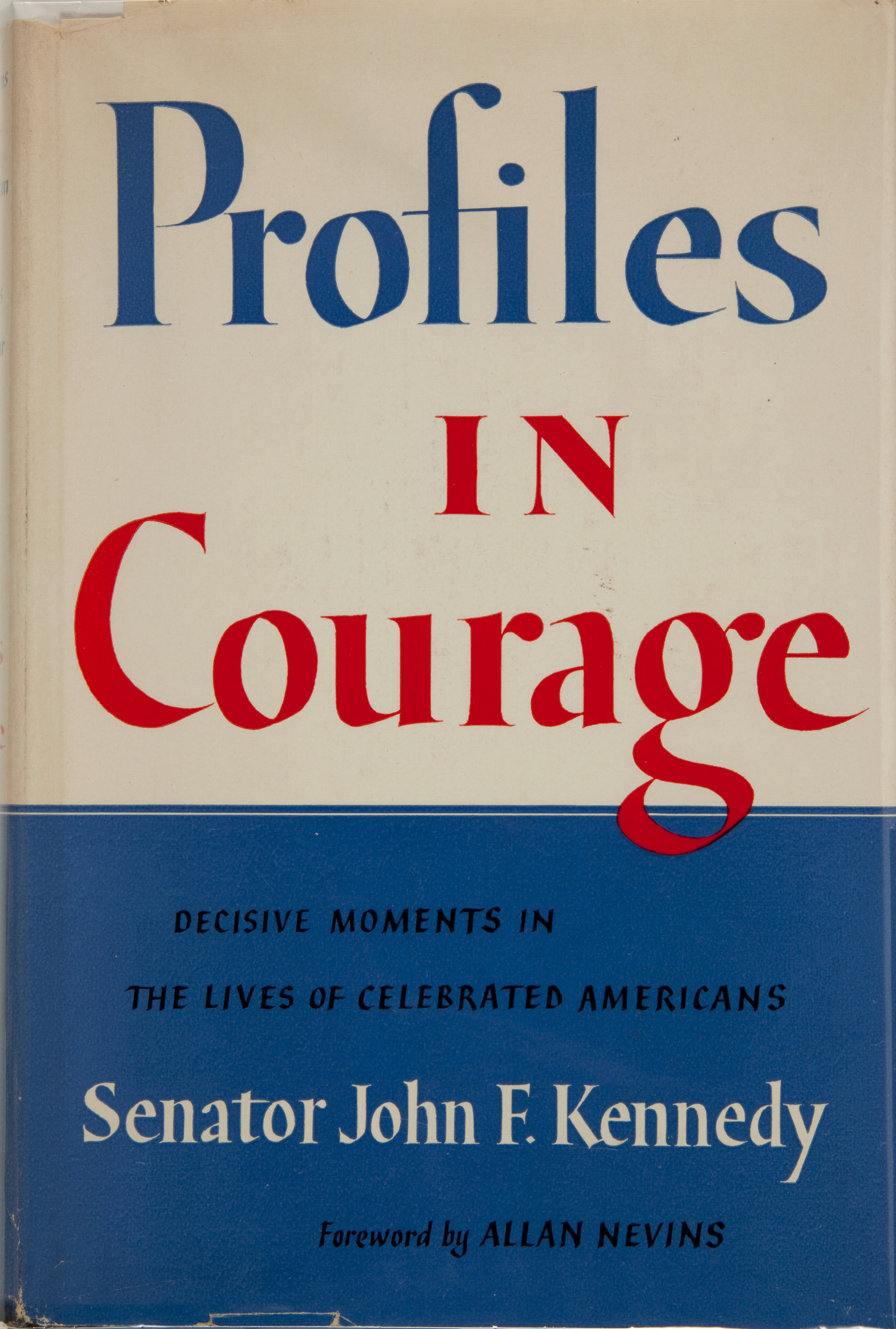
- First edition
- Author: John F. Kennedy; Ted Sorensen (ghostwriter)
- Subject: United States senators
- Genre: Biography
- Publisher: Harper & Brothers
- Publication date: January 1, 1956
- Pages: 272
- ISBN: 978-0-06-095544-1
- Dewey Decimal: 973.099
- LC Class: E176 .K4
- Preceded by: Why England Slept
- Followed by: A Nation of Immigrants

Profiles in Courage is a 1956 volume of short biographies describing acts of bravery and integrity by eight United States senators. The book, authored by John F. Kennedy with Ted Sorensen as a ghostwriter, profiles senators who defied the opinions of their party and constituents to do what they felt was right and suffered severe criticism and losses in popularity as a result. It begins with a quotation from Edmund Burke on the courage of the English statesman Charles James Fox, in his 1783 "attack upon the tyranny of the East India Company" in the House of Commons, and focuses on mid-19th-century antebellum America and the efforts of senators to delay the American Civil War. Profiles in Courage was widely celebrated and became a bestseller. It includes a foreword by Allan Nevins.

John F. Kennedy, then a U.S. senator, won the Pulitzer Prize for the work. However, in his 2008 autobiography, Kennedy's speechwriter Ted Sorensen, who was presumed as early as 1957 to be the book's ghostwriter, acknowledged that he "did a first draft of most chapters" and "helped choose the words of many of its sentences". Jules Davids, who was a history professor for Kennedy's wife Jacqueline when she was a student at George Washington University, is also acknowledged to have made key contributions to the historical research and organizational planning for the book.

In 1990, Kennedy's family created the Profile in Courage Award to honor individuals who have acted with courage in the same vein as those profiled in the book. The book also served as the basis for an American historical anthology series of the same name that was telecast weekly on NBC from November 8, 1964, to May 9, 1965.

== Background and history ==
Kennedy was elected to the House of Representatives in 1946, 1948, and 1950 from the state of Massachusetts. In 1952 and 1958, he was elected a senator from Massachusetts and served in the Senate until resigning after he was elected president in 1960. It was a passage from Herbert Agar's 1950 book The Price of Union about an act of courage by an earlier senator from Massachusetts, John Quincy Adams, that gave Kennedy the idea of writing about senatorial courage. He showed the passage to Ted Sorensen and asked him to see if he could find some more examples. This Sorensen did, and eventually they had enough not just for an article, as Kennedy had originally envisaged, but a book. With help from research assistants and the Library of Congress, Sorensen wrote a first draft of the book while Kennedy was bedridden with Addison's disease and recovering from back surgery during 1954 and 1955.

Historian Timothy Naftali remarked that another motivation for Kennedy to write the book was his desire to improve his reputation after failing to vote to censure Senator Joseph McCarthy. Naftali said it was Kennedy's ambition to become Vice President of the United States, and that he included Edmund Ross to appeal to Southern Democrats.

== Summary of senators profiled ==
- John Quincy Adams, from Massachusetts, for breaking away from the Federalist Party.
- Daniel Webster, who like Kennedy represented Massachusetts in Congress, for speaking in favor of the Compromise of 1850.
- Thomas Hart Benton, from Missouri, for staying in the Democratic Party despite his opposition to the extension of slavery in the territories.
- Sam Houston, from Texas, for speaking against the Kansas–Nebraska Act of 1854, which would have allowed those two territories to decide on the slavery question.
- Edmund G. Ross, from Kansas, for voting for acquittal in the Andrew Johnson impeachment trial. As a result of Ross's vote, along with those of six other Republicans, Democrat Johnson's presidency was saved, and the stature of the office was preserved.
- Lucius Lamar, from Mississippi, for eulogizing Charles Sumner on the Senate floor and other efforts to mend ties between the North and South during Reconstruction, and for his principled opposition to the Bland–Allison Act to permit free coinage of silver.
- George W. Norris, from Nebraska, for opposing Joseph Gurney Cannon's autocratic power as Speaker of the House, for speaking out against arming U.S. merchant ships during the United States' neutral period in World War I, and for supporting the presidential campaign of Democrat Al Smith, the first Catholic to be a major party nominee.
- Robert A. Taft, from Ohio, for criticizing the Nuremberg Trials for trying Nazi war criminals under ex post facto laws. Counter-criticism against Taft's statements was vital to his failure to secure the Republican nomination for president in 1948.

== Reception ==
After its release on January 1, 1956, Profiles in Courage became a bestseller. The book won the Pulitzer Prize for Biography in 1957, even though it was not one of the finalists forwarded to the prize board from the selection committee. Kennedy's father Joseph asked columnist Arthur Krock, his political adviser and a longtime member of the prize board, to persuade others to vote for it.

The book returned to the bestseller lists in 1961 after Kennedy became president and again in 1963 after he was assassinated.

Profiles in Courage was the basis of a television series of the same name that aired on the NBC network during the 1964–1965 television season.

In 1956, Kennedy gave a copy of the book to Richard Nixon, who responded that he was looking forward to reading it. After being defeated by Kennedy in the 1960 United States presidential election, Nixon was advised by Mamie Eisenhower to write a book himself. Nixon visited the White House in April 1961 and got the same advice from Kennedy: writing a book would raise the public image of any public man. Nixon wrote his book Six Crises (1962) in response to Profiles in Courage.

In response to criticism that the book included only men, in 1958 Kennedy published an article in the women's magazine McCall's that honored "Three Women of Courage," by adding Jeannette Rankin, Anne Hutchinson, and Prudence Crandall to his Hall of Fame.

== Authorship ==
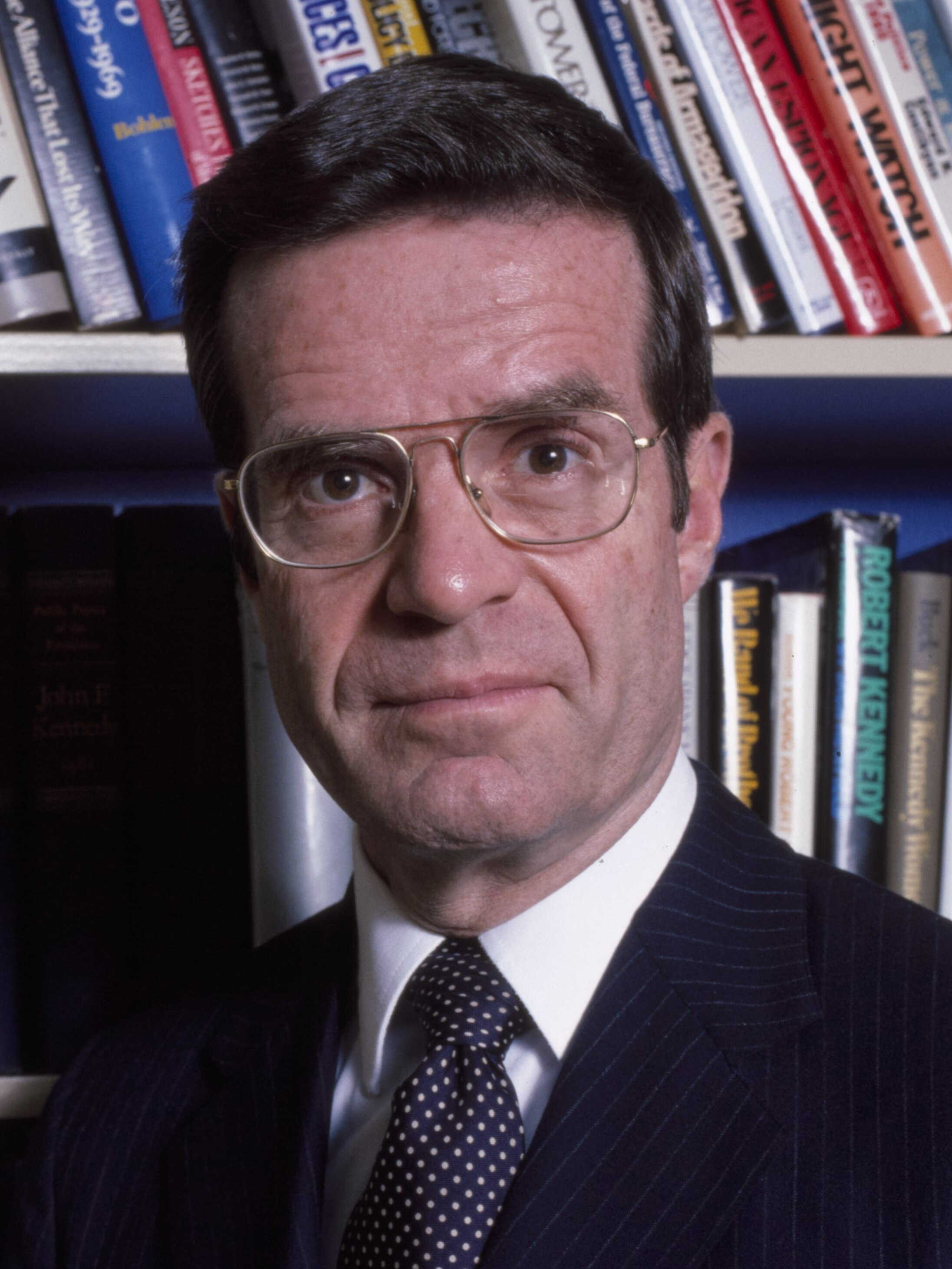
Ted Sorensen, the ghostwriter of Profiles in Courage, was also John F. Kennedy's main speechwriter.

On December 7, 1957, journalist Drew Pearson appeared as a guest on The Mike Wallace Interview and made the claim that "John F. Kennedy is the only man in history that I know who won a Pulitzer Prize for a book that was ghostwritten for him." Wallace replied: "You know for a fact, Drew, that the book Profiles in Courage was written for Senator Kennedy ... by someone else?" Pearson responded that he did and that Kennedy speechwriter Ted Sorensen wrote the book. Wallace responded: "And Kennedy accepted a Pulitzer Prize for it? And he never acknowledged the fact?" Pearson replied: "No, he has not. You know, there's a little wisecrack around the Senate about Jack ... some of his colleagues say, 'Jack, I wish you had a little less profile and more courage.'"

Joseph P. Kennedy saw the broadcast, then called his lawyer, Clark Clifford, yelling: "Sue the bastards for fifty million dollars!" Soon Clifford and Robert F. Kennedy showed up at ABC and told executives that the Kennedys would sue unless the network issued a full retraction and apology. Wallace and Pearson insisted that the story was true and refused to comply. Nevertheless, ABC made the retraction and apology, which made Wallace furious.

According to The Straight Dope, Herbert Parmet later analyzed the text of Profiles in Courage and wrote in his book Jack: The Struggles of John F. Kennedy (1980) that although Kennedy did oversee the production and provided for the direction and message of the book, it was Sorensen who provided most of the work that went into the end product. The thematic essays that comprise the first and last chapters "may be viewed largely as [Kennedy's] own work", however.

In addition to Kennedy's speechwriter Sorensen, Jacqueline Kennedy recruited her history instructor from Georgetown University, Jules Davids, to work on the project. Davids told a Kennedy biographer that he and Sorensen had researched and written drafts of most of the book. Kennedy's handwritten notes, which Kennedy showed to reporters to prove his authorship, are now in the Kennedy Library, but are mostly preliminary notes about John Quincy Adams, a particular interest of Kennedy's, and are not a readable draft of the chapter on Adams. During the six-month period when the book was being written, Sorensen worked full-time on the project, sometimes twelve-hour days; Kennedy spent most of the same period traveling, campaigning, or hospitalized. Kennedy's preserved notes show that he kept up with the book's progress, but historian Garry Wills remarked that Kennedy's notes contain no draft of any stage of the manuscript, or of any substantial part of it.

In Sorensen's 2008 autobiography, Counselor: A Life at the Edge of History, he said he wrote "a first draft of most of the chapters" of Profiles in Courage and "helped choose the words of many of its sentences". Sorensen also wrote: "While in Washington, I received from Florida almost daily instructions and requests by letter and telephone – books to send, memoranda to draft, sources to check, materials to assemble, and Dictaphone drafts or revisions of early chapters" (Sorensen, p. 146). Sorensen wrote that Kennedy "worked particularly hard and long on the first and last chapters, setting the tone and philosophy of the book". Kennedy "publicly acknowledged in his introduction to the book my extensive role in its composition" (p. 147). Sorensen claimed that in May 1957, Kennedy "unexpectedly and generously offered, and I happily accepted, a sum to be spread over several years, that I regarded as more than fair" for his work on the book. Indeed, this supported a long-standing recognition of the collaborative effort that Kennedy and Sorensen had developed since 1953.

Craig Fehrman, author of Author in Chief: The Untold Story of Our Presidents and the Books They Wrote, wrote in 2020 that "The book's structure, research, first draft and most of its second came from [Sorensen]". According to Fehrman, "Even the book's idea came from him (Sorensen)": after Kennedy suggested that Sorensen write a magazine article on Adams's courage as senator for publication with Kennedy's name, Sorensen suggested to Kennedy in a letter accompanying the draft article that he ask Harper & Brothers—where Michael Temple Canfield, Jacqueline Kennedy's brother-in-law, worked—if the publisher were interested in a book on the topic. They shared in profits from all work Sorensen ghostwrote for Kennedy, as agreed when the former joined the latter's staff. Kennedy wrote the preface but did not mention Sorensen. After Sorensen returned an edited draft of the preface with a request for a mention, Kennedy added a line thanking him "for his invaluable assistance". Sorensen received a $6,000 bonus, about one third of his annual salary.

After the Wallace–Pearson television appearance, Kennedy and Sorensen agreed that the rumor could ruin Kennedy's presidential plans. Sorensen swore an affidavit stating that his only role was "to assist [Kennedy] in the assembly and preparation of research and other materials upon which much of the book is based". The document said that Sorensen's work was "very generously acknowledged by the Senator in the preface", despite the credit only appearing after Sorensen asked Kennedy for it. Kennedy claimed that he had kept all of the earnings from Profiles despite the two payments to Sorensen, and that the Pulitzer was proof of his authorship. "The lies became cover for the lies", Fehrman concluded.

Fehrman further claimed Kennedy worked harder on promoting Profiles, signing autographs and making many public appearances for the book, than he did writing it. Kennedy tried to have it published before the end of 1955 to qualify for the Pulitzer Prizes in 1956; Profiles appeared on its original date of January 2, 1956, eligible for the 1957 prizes. Although friends and family said that the Pulitzer made Kennedy happier than his World War II Purple Heart or any other award, and Kennedy told Margaret Coit in 1953 "I would rather win a Pulitzer Prize than be president", the award caused the press to investigate Profiles's authorship. In May 1957, two weeks after the award, Gilbert Seldes discussed the rumor that Kennedy had not written the book in The Village Voice. That month the Kennedys agreed to pay Sorensen more than $100,000, an amount Fehrman said was "frankly astonishing".

Though Kennedy's legacy continues to take criticism for relying on Sorensen for improving Kennedy's grammar and style, and for creating the final prose of much of the volume, contemporary Kennedy scholar and foreign policy expert Professor Fredrick Logevall wrote that in several ways Kennedy may have played the more essential role in the book, noting importantly that "Kennedy made the final choices about which figures to feature in the book. And although Sorensen took the lead role in drafting the bulk of the chapters, with significant input on some of them from Professor Jules Davids and Jim Landis, the senator (Kennedy) was responsible for the book's architecture, themes, and arguments." As noted earlier, Kennedy was especially critical to the first and the last chapters, as well as a large portion of Chapter 2 on John Quincy Adams. Logevall went on to claim that Sorensen, though a highly capable writer, as a political novice didn't have Kennedy's ability to reflect on the importance and place of compromise in political life, nor was he as knowledgeable about American history as Kennedy. According to Logevall, and attested to by both Jackie Kennedy, and many friends, Kennedy worked for many weeks on the book during his long and painful recovery from back surgery, noting, "often he worked while prone in bed, on heavy white paper in his loose, widely spaced hand; on better days he was propped up on the patio or the porch." Further, Kennedy played a highly active role in locating research sources, for "on an almost daily basis, Sorensen recalled, Kennedy sent him instructions about 'books to ship down, memoranda to prepare, sources to check, materials to assemble.'" Kennedy instructed Sorensen to scan more than two hundred books, journals, magazines, (and) Congressional records. Sorensen later noted, "the way Jack worked was to take all the material, mine and his, pencil it, dictate the fresh copy in his own words, pencil it again, he never used a typewriter". However, a letter Jules Davids wrote in 1957, which was made public in 1997, backed claims that he and Sorensen were in fact the key contributors to the book's history research.

In response to claims by other authors such as Fehrman and Seldes that Kennedy was deceptive in claiming the book's authorship, Logevall alleged "Kennedy had a bigger role in the writing, and certainly in the conception and framing of the book than many of these analysts suggested; the book's broad themes and overarching structure were his." Logevall also added that it was standard for American politicians in the mid-twentieth century, as well as later, to get significant assistance on books that appeared under their name alone. Had Kennedy denied authorship or not accepted the Pulitzer, it may have been damaging to his political career, and though much of the work of the book was indeed Sorensen's, by legal arrangement accepted by Sorensen, the authorship was indeed Kennedy's according to Logevall.

According to Logevall, the book's most significant contribution was not as an in-depth history, nor was it exceptional in its literary style, of which Sorensen was likely the greatest contributor. Rather, he argues the book's value lay in its "broad interpretive claims", best told in the two chapters in which Kennedy's contribution was greatest, the first and the last. Logevall wrote that for Kennedy, the book's central theme, which he and not Sorensen selected, may have been "We can compromise our political positions, but not ourselves". Kennedy further wrote, "We can resolve the clash of interests without conceding our ideals." Logevall stated that the ability to compromise while staying faithful to ideals was central to Kennedy's political aspirations.

== Accuracy ==
Author David O. Stewart has questioned the accuracy of the book's chapter on the impeachment of Andrew Johnson. Of Johnson's defenders in the Senate, Profiles in Courage stated that "Not a single one of them escaped the terrible torture of vicious criticism engendered by their vote to acquit." However, Stewart described the supposed persecution as a "myth" and continued, "None was a victim of postimpeachment retribution. Indeed, their careers were not wildly different from those of the thirty-five senators who voted to convict Andrew Johnson." However, Ross lost his bid for re-election two years after casting a vote acquitting Johnson. There is also evidence that Edmund Ross was bribed to vote for Johnson's acquittal, which is not mentioned in Profiles in Courage.

Kennedy also praised Lucius Lamar, who, while working in the public eye towards reconciliation, privately was an instigator, according to the claim of author Nicholas Lemann, of growing racial agitation. In the profile of Lamar, Kennedy had also included a single paragraph condemning Adelbert Ames, the Maine-born governor of Mississippi from 1873 to 1876, as an opportunistic carpetbagger whose administration was "sustained and nourished by Federal bayonets". Ames's daughter, Blanche Ames Ames, was outraged, and regularly wrote to Kennedy for years afterward in protest, demanding a retraction of the "defamatory insinuations" and accused him of pandering to Southern readers. The letter-writing continued even after Kennedy had been elected to the presidency. This prompted Kennedy to turn to George Plimpton, Ames's grandson and a classmate of Robert F. Kennedy's at Harvard, asking him if he could get his grandmother to cease, claiming her letters were interfering with government business. Blanche Ames Ames eventually would publish her own biography of her father in 1964.
