= Lauren Collins (journalist) =

American journalist

- Born: Lauren Zurn Collins; 1980 (age 45–46); Wilmington, North Carolina, U.S.
- Occupation: Journalist
- Children: 2

Lauren Zurn Collins (born 1980, Wilmington, North Carolina) is an American journalist who has been a staff writer at The New Yorker since 2008. She is the author of When in French: Love in a Second Language (2016), and They Stole A City.

Since 2010, Collins has been based in Europe, covering stories for the New Yorker from London, Paris, Copenhagen, and other capitals. Fluent in French, Collins currently lives in Paris with her husband and two children.

== Bibliography ==
- When in French: Love in a Second Language (2016), ISBN 9780143110736
- They Stole a City: Wilmington’s White Supremacist Coup and the Families Who Live with Its Legacy (2026) ISBN 9781984878816

=== Articles ===
- Collins, Lauren (December 6, 2004). "Who's counting?". The Talk of the Town. Top This Dept. The New Yorker. 80 (38): 52.
- — (March 21, 2005). "Stitches". The Talk of the Town. Here to There Dept. The New Yorker. 81 (5): 28, 30.
- — (May 2, 2005). "The writing wife". Ink. The New Yorker. 81 (11): 42.
- — (May 16, 2005). "Where they are now". Dept. of Photography. The New Yorker.
- — (July 4, 2005). "Don't laugh". Dept. of Education. The New Yorker.
- — (August 1, 2005). "One man show". Dept. of Multitasking. The New Yorker.
- — (August 22, 2005). "O.B.L." Close Readings. The New Yorker.
- — (April 5, 2010). "Floorscapes". The Talk of the Town. At the Casino. The New Yorker. 86 (8): 24, 26.
- — (April 26, 2010). "Talkback". The Talk of the Town. Here to There Dept. The New Yorker. 86 (10): 22.
- — (May 24, 2010). "Mari Vanna". Goings on About Town. Tables for Two. The New Yorker. 86 (14): 8.
- — (2016). When in French : love in a second Language. New York: Penguin Press.
- —, ed. (2017). The best American travel writing 2017. Boston: Houghton Mifflin Harcourt.
- — (February 27, 2017). "The children's odyssey". A Reporter at Large. The New Yorker. 93 (2): 52–61. (Note: Title in the online table of contents is "Europe's child–refugee crisis".)
- — (April 24, 2017). "Secrets in the sauce : the politics of barbecue and the legacy of a White Supremacist". Letter from South Carolina. The New Yorker. 93 (10): 66–73. (Note: Online version is titled "America's most political food".)
- — (May 8, 2017). "Can the center hold? Notes from a free-for-all election". Letter from France. The New Yorker. 93 (12): 20–26. (Note: Online version is titled "The future of Europe hinges on a face-off in France".)
- — (September 7, 2020). "Contested : Miss America's winners and losers, rule-breakers and history-makers". The Critics. Books. The New Yorker. 96 (26): 72–75. (Note: Online version is titled "Miss America's history–makers and rule–breakers".)
- — (September 21, 2020). "Roll of the dice". The Talk of the Town. Paris Postcard. The New Yorker. 96 (28): 14–15. (Note: Online version is titled "Stop doomscrolling and play a board game about class warfare".)
- — (March 29, 2021). "Repaving Memory Lane". The Talk of the Town. Brave New World. The New Yorker. 97 (6): 18–19. (Note: Online version is titled "How a personal-photo curator separates the is-this-a-rash selfies from the keepers" [sic].)
- — (June 21, 2021). "L'homme du jour : Omar Sy's breakout moment". Profiles. The New Yorker. 97 (17): 42–49. (Note: Online version is titled "The formidable charm of Omar Sy".)
- — (April 4, 2022). "The unravelling of an expert on serial killers". Dept. of Criminology. The New Yorker.
- — (May 30, 2022). "Soaking it in : taking a cure in the salty and sulfurous waters of France". Letter from Vichy. The New Yorker. 98 (14): 26–31. (Note: Online version is titled "Seeking a cure in France's waters".)

———————
