= List of Russian women writers =

This is a list of women writers who were born in Russia or whose writings are closely associated with that country.

== A ==
- Bella Akhmadulina (1937–2010), poet, short story writer, translator
- Anna Akhmatova (1899–1966), acclaimed poet, author of Requiem
- Elizaveta Akhmatova (1820–1904), "Leila" published a journal for 30 years with translations of English and French writers
- Elena Akselrod (born 1932), Belarus-born Russian poet, translator
- Ogdo Aksyonova (1936–1995), poet, short story writer, founder of Dolgan written literature
- Tatiana Aleshina (born 1961), singer-songwriter, poet, short story writer
- Margarita Aliger (1915–1992), poet, essayist, journalist
- Svetlana Alliluyeva (1926–2011), daughter of Joseph Stalin, memoirist, biographer, author of Twenty Letters to a Friend
- Al Altaev (1852–1959), writer for children
- Lou Andreas-Salomé (1861–1937), psychoanalyst, memoirist, literary essayist, novelist, often writing in German
- Domna Anisimova (19th century), poet
- Nina Pávlovna Annenkova-Bernár (1859/64–1933) actress, writer, playwright
- Varvara Annenkova (1795–1866), prominent poet
- Alexandra Nikitichna Annenskaya (1840–1915), translator and writer of feminist novels
- Olga Anstei (1912–1985), writer about the Holocaust
- Elena Ivanovna Apréleva (1846–1923), non-fiction writer, short story writer, memoirist, playwright, children's writer
- Maria Arbatova (born 1957), novelist, playwright, poet, journalist, feminist
- Olga Arefieva (born 1966), singer-songwriter, poet, musician
- Yekaterina Avdeyeva (1788–1865), non-fiction writer

== B ==
- Anna Barkova (1901–1976), poet, journalist, playwright, essayist, memoirist, novelist
- Anna Barykova (1839–1893), poet, satirist and translator
- Agniya Barto (1906–1981), poet, children's writer, screenwriter
- Olga Mihaylovna Bebutova (1879–1952), actress, novelist, magazine editor
- Maria Belakhova (1903–1969), children's writer, magazine editor, educator
- Katerina Belkina (born 1974), photographer, painter
- Nina Berberova (1901–1993), short story writer, novelist, biographer, author of the autobiography The Italics are Mine
- Lydia Yudifovna Berdyaev (1871–1945), poet
- Olga Bergholz (1910–1975), poet, playwright, journalist
- Antonina Bludova (1813–1891), salonist, memoirist
- Natella Boltyanskaya (born 1965), songwriter, poet, radio host
- Marina Boroditskaya (born 1954), poet, children's writer, translator
- Vera Broido (1907–2004), memoirist, non-fiction writer, autobiographer
- Anna Bunina (1774–1829), poet, first Russian women to earn a living from writing

== C ==
- Lidia Charskaya (1875–1938), novelist, works recently revived
- Svetlana Chervonnaya (born 1948), historian, non-fiction writer, essayist
- Elena Chudinova (born 1959), novelist, poet, playwright, columnist
- Lydia Chukovskaya (1907–1996), novelist, author of Sofia Petrovna

== D ==
- Tatyana Danilyants (born 1971), film director, photographer, poet
- Hadiya Davletshina (1905–1954), Baskir poet, prose writer, playwright
- Irina Denezhkina (born 1981), short story writer
- Marina Denikina (1919–2005), Russian-born French historical novelist, journalist
- Regina Derieva (1949–2013), widely translated poet, essayist
- Valentina Dmitryeva (1859–1947), short story writer, children's writer, autobiographer
- Aliona Doletskaya (born 1955), journalist, editor, television host, translator
- Veronika Dolina (born 1956), poet, songwriter
- Darya Dontsova (born 1952), best selling crime-fiction novelist, autobiographer
- Anna Dostoyevskaya (1846–1918), memoirist, biographer
- Lyubov Dostoyevskaya (1869–1926), biographer of Dostoyevsky, memoirist, short story writer, novelist
- Yulia Drunina (1924–1991), poet
- Svetlana Druzhinina (born 1935), actress, screenwriter, film director
- Miroslava Duma (born 1985), fashion writer, magazine editor

== E ==
- Tamara Eidelman (born 1959), contemporary historian, translator, contributor to Russian Life
- Roza Eldarova (1923–2021), journalist, memoirist, politician

== F ==
- Elena Fanailova (born 1962), journalist, poet, columnist, translator
- Dorothea de Ficquelmont (1804–1863), diarist (in French), letter writer
- Vera Figner (1852–1942), revolutionary memoirist, biographer, columnist
- Olga Forsh (1873–1961), novelist, playwright, memoirist
- Elena Frolova (born 1969), singer-songwriter, poet

== G ==
- Cherubina de Gabriak, pen name of Elisaveta Ivanovna Dmitrieva (1887–1928), poet, translator
- Nina Gagen-Torn (1900–1986), poet, short story writer, historian
- Nora Gal (1912–1991), critic, essayist, prominent translator
- Alisa Ganieva (born 1985), pen name Gulla Khirachev, novelist, short story writer, essayist
- Tatiana Garmash-Roffe (born 1959), novelist, short story writer, detective story writer
- Liudmila Gatagova, historian, since c.1993 several historical works
- Vera Gedroitz (1870–1932), medical doctor, poet
- Marina Gershenovich (born 1960), poet, translator
- Masha Gessen (born 1967), journalist, columnist, biographer, writing in Russian and English
- Lidiya Ginzburg (1902–1990), critic, historian, memoirist
- Yevgenia Ginzburg (1904–1977), educator, journalist, historian, memoirist
- Zinaida Gippius (1869–1945), modernist poet, novelist, playwright, short story writer, translator, several works translated into English
- Avdotia Glinka (1795–1863), spiritual writer, poet and translator
- Maria Golovnina (c.1980–2015), journalist, Reuters bureau chief for Afghanistan and Pakistan
- Natalya Gorbanevskaya (1936–2013), poet, translator
- Nina Gorlanova (born 1947), short story writer, novelist
- Anastasia Gosteva (born 1975), novelist, short story writer, poet, journalist
- Isabella Grinevskaya (1864–1944), novelist, playwright
- Olga Grushin (born 1971), Russian-American novelist, translator
- Elena Guro (1877–1913), playwright, poet, novelist, artist

== I ==
- Vera Inber (1890–1972), poet, essayist, translator
- Aleksandra Ishimova (1805–1881), children's writer, translator
- Nina Iskrenko (1951–1995), poet
- Lidiya Ivanova (1936–2007), journalist, television presenter
- Praskovya Ivanovskaya (1852–1935), revolutionary, memoirist

== J ==
- Nadezhda Joffe (1906–1999), memoirist, biographer

== K ==
- Vera Kamsha (born 1962), Ukrainian-born Russian journalist, fantasy novelist
- Irina Karnaoukhova (1901–1959), Ukrainian-Russian children's writer and folklorist
- Anna Kashina, Russian-American novelist, completed The Princess of Dhagabad in 2000
- Rimma Kazakova (1932–2008), poet, popular songwriter
- Elena Kazantseva (born 1956), Belarusian-born Russian poet, songwriter
- Eufrosinia Kersnovskaya (1908–1994), Gulag memoirist
- Nadezhda Khvoshchinskaya (1824–1889), novelist, poet, critic, translator
- Marusya Klimova (born 1961), prominent non-fiction writer, literary historian, translator
- Ekaterina Kniazhnina (1746–1797), poet, salonist, considered by some to be the first Russian woman writer
- Alexandra Kollontai (1872–1952), politician, writer
- Ina Konstantinova (1924–1944), wartime diarist
- Sofia Kovalevskaya (1859–1891), mathematician, non-fiction writer
- Nadezhda Kozhevnikova (born 1949), journalist, essayist
- Zoya Krakhmalnikova (1929–2008), dissident journalist, autobiographer
- Elena Krishtof (1925–2001), writer, and educator
- Yustina Kruzenshtern-Peterets (1903–1983), journalist and poet in the diaspora
- Olga Kryuchkova (born 1966), historical novelist

== L ==
- Nadezhda Lappo-Danilevsky (1874–1951), poet, novelist
- Anna Larina (1914–1996), memoirist
- Yulia Latynina (born 1966), journalist, novelist, television presenter
- Marina Lesko, since 1992, journalist, columnist
- Sonya Levien (1888–1960), screenwriter
- Olga Lipovskaya (1954–2021), poet, magazine editor, feminist
- Mirra Lokhvitskaya (1869–1905), acclaimed poet
- Nina Lugovskaya (1918–1993), Gulag diarist

== M ==
- Yelena Maglevannaya (born 1981), journalist
- Natalia Malakhovskaia (born 1947), feminist writer
- Tatiana Mamonova (born 1943), poet, journalist, feminist
- Nadezhda Mandelstam (1899–1980), memoirist, biographer
- Anna Margolin (1887–1952), Russian-American Yiddish-language poet
- Alexandra Marinina (born 1957), best selling crime fiction novelist, works widely translated
- Maria Markova (born 1982), poet
- Novella Matveyeva (1934–2016), poet, songwriter, screenwriter, playwright
- Olga Martynova (born 1962), poet, essayist, writing in Russian and German
- Larisa Matros (born 1938), sociologist, novelist, short story writer, critic, poet
- Novella Matveyeva (1934–2016), poet, screenwriter, dramatist, singer-songwriter
- Vera Matveyeva (1945–1976), poet, singer-songwriter
- Ida Mett (1901–1973), historical writer, magazine editor
- Vera Mikhailova (1907–1985), children's writer and journalist
- Elena Milashina (born 1977), investigative journalist
- Maria Moravskaya (1890–1947), poet, essayist, critic, translator
- Yunna Morits (born 1937), poet, translator, short story writer, children's writer
- Margarita Morozova (1873–1958), publisher, memoirist
- Tatyana Moskvina (1958–2022), columnist, novelist, journalist, critic, television host
- Lena Mukhina (1924–1991), wartime diarist in Leningrad

== N ==
- Maria de Naglowska (1883–1936), occultist writer, journalist, translator, wrote in French
- Vera Nazarian (born 1966), Armenian-Russian American science fiction novelist
- Tsarevna Natalya Alexeyevna of Russia (1673–1716), playwright
- Zhanna Nemtsova (born 1984), journalist, social activist
- Aleksandra Nikolaenko (born 1976), writer and winner of the 2017 Russian Booker Prize

== O ==
- Irina Odoyevtseva (1895–1990), poet, novelist, memoirist
- Raisa Orlova (1918–1989), literary historian, journalist, latterly in Germany

== P ==
- Marina Palei (born 1955), journalist, novelist, short story writer, translator
- Avdotya Panaeva (1820–1893), novelist, short story writer, memoirist, salonist
- Vera Panova (1905–1973), novelist, playwright, journalist, works translated into English
- Sophia Parnok (1885–1933), poet, children's writer, translator
- Karolina Pavlova (1807–1893), poet, novelist
- Vera Pavlova (born 1963), poet
- Olga Perovskaya (1902–1961), children's writer
- Kyra Petrovskaya Wayne (1918–2018), Russian-American non-fiction writer, autobiographer
- Maria Petrovykh (1908–1979), poet, translator
- Lyudmila Petrushevskaya (born 1938), novelist, playwright, singer
- Irina Petrushova (born 1965), journalist, newspaper editor
- Anna Politkovskaya (1958–2006), journalist, human rights activist
- Elizaveta Polonskaya (1890–1969), poet, translator, journalist
- Sofiya Pregel (1894–1972), poet
- Maria Prilezhayeva (1903–1989), children's writer, critic, novelist
- Rufina Ivanovna Pukhova (1932–2021), memoirist, wife of Kim Philby

== R ==
- Rita Rait-Kovaleva (1898–1989), memoirist, translator
- Ayn Rand (1905–1982), Russian-born American novelist, philosopher
- Maria Rasputin (1898–1977), memoirist
- Irina Ratushinskaya (1954–2017), poet, memoirist
- Helena Roerich (1879–1955), philosopher, artist, non-fiction writer, letter writer, translator
- Yevdokiya Rostopchina (1811–1858), early poet, playwright, translator
- Dina Rubina (born 1953), Russian-Israeli novelist, short story writer, essayist
- Maria Rybakova (born 1973), short story writer, novelist
- Elena Rzhevskaya (1919–2017), Second World War memoirist

== S ==
- Irina Saburova (1907–1979), journalist, short story writer, novelist, translator
- Nina Mikhailovna Sadur (1950–2023), playwright and prose writer
- Konkordiya Samoilova (1876–1921), founding editor of Pravda
- Nathalie Sarraute (1900–1999), Russian-French novelist, playwright, memoirist
- Tanya Savicheva (1930–1944), Leningrad diarist
- Olesya Shmagun (born 1987), investigative journalist
- Olga Sedakova (born 1949), poet, translator
- Ekaterina Sedia (born 1970), Russian-American fantasy novelist, author of The Alchemy of Stone
- Comtesse de Ségur (1799–1874), Russian-French novelist
- Yulia Sineokaya (born 1969), philosopher and educator
- Marietta Shaginyan (1888–1982), novelist, political activist
- Olga Shapir (1850–1916), novelist, feminist
- Margarita Sharapova (born 1962), novelist, short story writer, now living in Portugal
- Tatiana Shchepkina-Kupernik (1874–1952), poet, columnist, playwright, translator
- Natalia Sheremeteva (1714–1771), early memoirist
- Maria Shkapskaya (1891–1952), poet, essayist, journalist
- Paullina Simons (born 1963), Russian-American best selling novelist
- Olga Slavnikova (born 1957), novelist, critic, author of 2017: A Novel
- Esphyr Slobodkina (1908–2002), Russian-American children's writer, illustrator, author of Caps for Sale
- Alexandra Smirnova (1809–1882), memoirist
- Sofia Soboleva (1840–1884), short story writer, children's writer, journalist
- Polyxena Solovyova (1867–1924), Russian poet and translator
- Sabina Spielrein (1885–1942), psychoanalyst, scientific writer
- Anna Strunsky (1877–1964), Russian-American journalist, novelist, socialist activist, co-authored The Kempton-Wace Letters
- Polina Suslova (1839–1918), short story writer
- Alexandra Sviridova (born 1951), screenwriter, television presenter, now living in New York

== T ==
- Yelizaveta Tarakhovskaya (1891–1968), poet, playwright, translator, children's writer
- Nadezhda Teffi (1872–1952), playwright, short story writer
- Fatima Tlisova (born 1966), journalist, now living in the United States
- Viktoriya Tokareva (born 1937), screenwriter, short story writer
- Natalia Tolstaya (1943–2010), educator, translator, text book writer, writing in Swedish and Russian
- Sophia Tolstaya (1844–1919), wife of Leo Tolstoy, diarist, memoirist
- Tatyana Tolstaya (born 1951), novelist, essayist, television presenter
- Elsa Triolet (1896–1970), novelist, wrote in Russian and (mainly) French
- Marina Tsvetaeva (1892–1941), poet, playwright
- Evgenia Tur (1815–1892), novelist, literary critic, children's writer

== U ==
- Anya Ulinich (born 1973), novelist, short story writer
- Lyudmila Ulitskaya (born 1943), novelist, short story writer

== V ==
- Larisa Vaneeva (born 1953), short story writer
- Galina Varlamova (1951–2019), Evenk philologist, works in Russian, Evenk and Yakut
- Svetlana Vasilenko (born 1956), short story writer, novelist
- Marie Vassiltchikov (1917–1978), wartime Berlin diarist
- Tatiana Vedenska (born 1976), novelist
- Anastasiya Verbitskaya (1861–1928), novelist, playwright, screenwriter, publisher, feminist
- Seda Vermisheva (1932–2020), Armenian-born Russian poet, economist, activist
- Lidia Veselitskaya (1857–1936), novelist, short story writer, memoirist, translator
- Frida Vigdorova (1915–1965), journalist, novelist
- Mariya Vilinska (1833–1907), novelist, short story writer, translator
- Zinaida Volkonskaya (1792–1862), poet, short story writer, playwright, salonist
- Hava Volovich (1916–2000), memoirist, actress, Gulag survivor
- Yekaterina Vorontsova-Dashkova (1743–1810), memoirist
- Anna Vyrubova (1884–1964), memoirist

== Y ==
- Tatyana Yesenina (1918–1992), novelist, journalist, memoirist
- Anna Yevreinova (1844–1919), feminist writer, editor, letter writer, lawyer

== Z ==
- Lyubov Zakharchenko (1961–2008), poet, songwriter
- Yulia Zhadovskaya (1824–1883), poet, novelist
- Vera Zhelikhovskaya (1835–1896), children's writer, novelist
- Polina Zherebtsova (born 1985), poet, diarist, author of Ant in a Glass Jar
- Maria Zhukova (1805–1855), novelist, short story writer, travel writer
- Valentina Zhuravleva (1933–2004), science fiction novelist, sometimes in collaboration with her husband Genrich Altshuller
- Lydia Zinovieva-Annibal (1866–1907), novelist, playwright
- Vera Zvyagintseva (1894–1972), actress, poet, translator, memoirist

== See also ==
- List of Russian-language writers
- List of women writers
- Russian literature
