= Sviridova =

Sviridova (Russian: Свиридова) is the feminine counterpart of Russian surname Sviridov. It may refer to:

== People ==
- Alexandra Sviridova (born 1951), Russian-American writer, journalist and filmmaker
- Alyona Sviridova (born 1962), three-time winner of the Russian Golden Gramophone Award
- Elena Sviridova (born 1988), Russian athlete in category T36 sprint events
- Evgeniya Sviridova (born 1986), Russian theater and film actress
- Olesya Sviridova (born 1989), Russian shot putter; see Athletics at the 2013 Summer Universiade – Women's shot put
- Sofiya Sviridova (1882–after 1928), Russian poet, prose writer, translator, musicologist and music critic
- Valentina Sviridova (1919–2012), Soviet volleyball player; see 1952 FIVB Volleyball Women's World Championship
- Valeriya Sviridova (born 1994), Russian gymnast

== Other ==
- Sviridova, Kursk Oblast, a village in Oktyabrsky District of Kursk Oblast

== See also ==
- Sviridov (disambiguation)
