= Elena Frolova =

Russian-Latvian singer (born 1969)

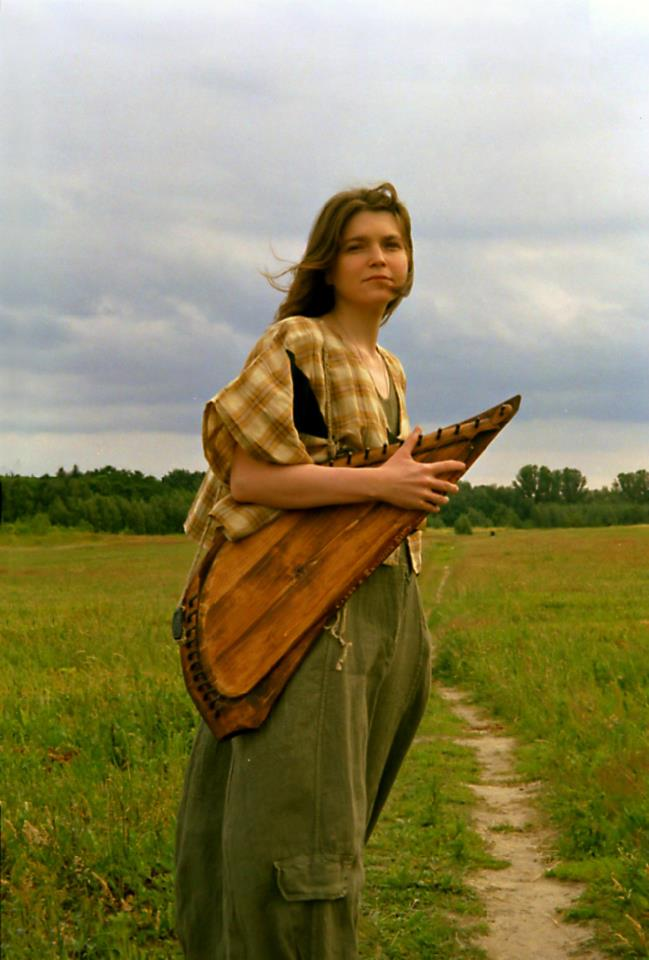
- Elena Frolova with gusli (Photo by Margarita Kabakova)

Background information
- Born: Elena Frolova; 1 October 1969 (age 57); Riga, Latvian SSR, Soviet Union
- Genres: Singer-songwriter, author song, ethnic Russian music, world music
- Occupations: singer, composer and poet
- Instruments: Vocals, guitar, gusli
- Years active: 1986–present
- Website: Her YouTube channel

Elena Borisovna Frolova (Russian: Елена Борисовна Фролова; born 1 October 1969) is a Russian singer-songwriter, composer, and poet. She has made songs based on 20th-century Russian poetry, including poems written by Marina Tsvetaeva, Sophia Parnok, Joseph Brodsky, Anna Barkova, Andrei Belyi, Varlam Shalamov, Maria Petrovykh, Veniamin Blazhenny, and Bulat Okudzhava, as well as her own poetry. Frolova is one of the few performers who use the gusli (Russian folk instrument) and the ancient harp, along with the classical six-string guitar as an accompaniment. During her 25 years of work, she created more than 630 songs and published more than 40 music albums.

== Biography ==
Born in Riga, Frolova composed her first song at the age of 15. The song is on the poem "I wrote on the slate" by Marina Tsvetaeva. She won many song and music festivals, including the Second All-Union Festival in Tallinn in 1988. Since 1988 Elena performed together with Vera Evushkina, in the author's duet "VerLen". She is a co-founder and active member of the creative group "ASiA", together with Tatiana Aleshina, Alexander Derevyagin and Nicholai Yakimov. She is a member of juries in multiple Russian art song festivals, including the Grushinsky festival. During the last few years, Elena made a number of tours in a trio named "Trilogy" with Julia Ziganshina (performer of Russian romance) and Elmira Galeeva (singer-songwriter).

Since 1989, Elena Frolova worked at the Moscow Theatre of Music and Poetry [ru] directed by Elena Kamburova. She is a member of the Union of Russian Writers. Since 1991, she made many tours with her solo concerts in Russia, Germany, Italy, France, and Israel. Her songs on poems by Russian poets of the Silver Age and her own poetry brought her wide recognition. According to Marina Gershenovich : "The cycle of songs based on poems by Marina Tsvetaeva makes you to believe in the idea of reincarnation. The image of Marina is just as real as your own perception of reality. Coming through the music and voice of Elena, Tsvetaeva rebels, loves, tell prophecies, makes fun, and creates... One can bring back from the death someone he truly loves. Elena Frolova does it with her songs."

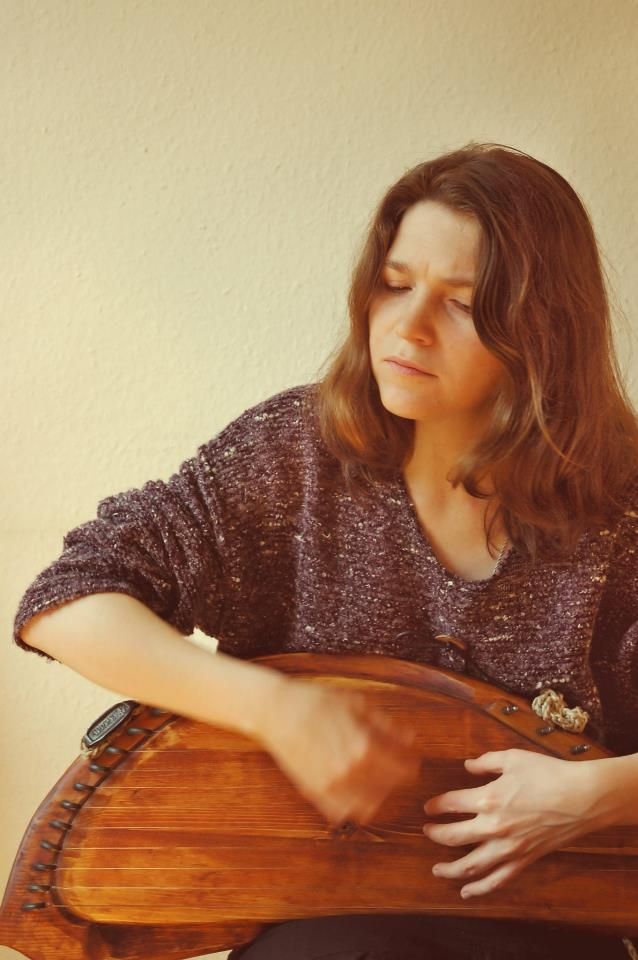
Elena Frolova playing gusli (Photo by Margarita Kabakova)

In 1996, Elena has mastered a new instrument, the gusli, to perform Russian folk and other songs.

Since 2002, she participates in World Music festivals and concerts in Russia, as well as many countries around Europe, Israel, Argentina, and Mexico. She performed in Théâtre de la Ville, Bienvenue à la Maison des Cultures du Monde [fr] and Théâtre des Abbesses in Paris, Teatro de la República in Mexico, as well as in Barcelona, Madrid, Brussels and Antwerp. Since 2008 she has been a regular guest at the Festival of Arts in Naxos.

Frolova took part in the congress "The historical experience of the Soviet Communist totalitarianism: the opposition to Gulag" in Milan in 2003 with the program on poems by Varlam Shalamov. In March 2004, she represented Russia at the First International Festival "Eurasia Diva" in Moscow.

In 2007 she published a book of her poetry, "Song for Eurydice". Frolova also participates in the creation of animated movies. She performed romance Don't wake her up at dawn... on words by Afanasy Fet in My Love by Aleksandr Petrov and composed music for the animated version of The Legend of Lady Godiva

In 2014, a documentary about Frolova's work based on Tsvetaeva's poems was realized by Irina Roerig [de]. The documentary is called "Patriotinnen"

== Poetry ==
Elena composed many songs on her own poetry, one of the most popular being A Straw. Many of her poems and songs have strong spiritual and Christian components, such as her Journey into Eden, a song dedicated to Francis of Assisi, and Disciple Day.

== Concerts published on YouTube ==
- Blessed are the humble in spirit (Introduction, Part 1, Part 2a, Part 2b, Part 3), 2010-2011.
- Russian Romance, Selected songs, Moscow, 2011
- Film-concert "Dorozhenka (That path).", Minsk, 2006
- Road to Heaven, concert in Kazan, 2003
- Concert in Yekaterinburg, 2009, where she presented songs on poetry by Marina Tsvetaeva, Sophia Parnok and Gubanov (Part 1) and her own poetry (Part 2)
- Elena Frolova and Dmitry Strotsev, part 1 and part 2, 2006
- Ten years to duet VerLen, Part 1 and Part 2, 1998
- Concerts and interviews on TV: Music of meetings and One who came to us, Above the roof, 2010

== Selected discography ==
- Songs on her own poetry
  - Wanderer 1995
  - My white sparrow, 1995
  - Heaven loves you, 1997
  - Dear road, Russian folk songs; poetry by Sergey Yesenin and Frolova, 2002
  - Travel to Paradise, 2005
  - Solar thread, 2006
  - Songs of heart, 2009
  - Lada, Russian folk songs, Esenin and Frolova, 2009, records at thankyou.ru
- Songs on poetry by Tsvetaeva
  - Angel and lion, Tsvetaeva, Blok and Mandelshtam, 1992
  - Annunciation Day, 1995 records
  - My Tsvetaeva part 1 and part 2, 2002
  - El sol de la tarde, 2008
  - Khvanyn'-Kolyvan, 2007
- Discs with Vera Evushkina
  - Verlen, 1992
  - Listen by heart, 2008 (1996–1998, 2006 records)
  - Oh, listen!, 2003
- My love, color the green, Tsvetaeva, Esenin and others, 1995
- Dove flied, 1999
- Poetry by Joseph Brodsky: Romance of a happy man, 2010
- Clouds are passing by, 2005, poetry by Parnok, Shalamov, Blazhenny, Tsvetaeva, Gershenovich and others
- A little theater on the small planet of Earth, 2009, poetry by Andrei Belyi
- Letter, 2003, poetry by Varlam Shalamov
- Wind from Viagolosa, poetry by Sophia Parnok, 2002
- A concert, 2003, songs on poems by Anna Barkova, Osip Mandelshtam, Veniamin Blazhenny, Varlam Shalamov, Anna Akhmatova and others
- Willow bird, songs on poems by Marina Gershenovich, Irina Ratushinskaya, Veniamin Blazhenny and others, 1999
- Bright holiday of homelessness, 1995, Brodsky, Tsvetaeva, Yuri Levitansky, Mikhail Kuzmin
- Poetry by Dmitry Strotsev: part 1, part 2, link, 2002
- Seconda Parte, disk in collaboration with creative group AZIA, 2002
  - A concert, part 1, part 2, 2003
- Mandelshtam Street, 2005, songs on poetry by Osip Mandelshtam
- Stairs of love, poetry by Leonid Gubanov, 2008
- Discs with Elmira Galeeva and Yulia Ziganshina
  - Trilogia, 2006
  - Rosemary, sage..., 2008
- Dear Enemy, 2007, poetry by Anna Barkova
- Russian Asian, 2007, Barkova, Frolova, Parnok
- Running girl – Russian Psyche, a concert, 2009
- IZ NEDR И НА ВЕТВЬ, 2009
- Bird Tango, Brodsky, Tsvetaeva, Blazhenny, Petrova, Frolova, 2010
- A concert, 2010
- Amor mio. Αγάπη μου. My love, Folk songs, poetic translations/texts to Russian by Frolova, 2011
- A concert, 2011
- Ves, Soundtrack to the poetry collection, poetry by Strotsev, Gershenovich, Vertinsky, Gumilev, Zabolotsky, Levitansky, 2013
