= Petrovykh =

Petrovykh is a Russian surname from the given name Pyotr, the Russian equivalent of Peter.

- Joseph Petrovykh (1872–1937), Metropolitan of Russian orthodox church
- Maria Petrovykh (1908–1979), Russian poet and translator
