= Sviridov =

Sviridov (Russian: Свиридов), a Russian masculine surname, may refer to:

== People ==
- Egor Sviridov, Russian football fan murdered in 2010
- Evgeni Sviridov (figure skater) (born 1974), Uzbekistani figure skater
- Evgeniy Sviridov (bandy) (born 1974), Belarusian bandy player
- Evgeny Sviridov (violinist) (born 1989), Russian violinist
- Georgy Sviridov (1915–1998), Soviet Russian composer
- Karp Sviridov (1896–1967), Soviet general
- Ruslan Sviridov (born 1973), Russian pianist
- Sergey Sviridov (born 1990), Russian decathlete
- Valentin Sviridov (born 1967), Russian politician
- Vladimir Sviridov (born 1990), Russian Paralympic athlete
- Vladimir Petrovich Sviridov (1897–1963), Soviet military commander
- Vladimir Sviridov (army officer) (1955–2023) , Russian military officer

== Places ==
- Sviridov, Kursk Oblast, a khutor in Medvensky District of Kursk Oblast, Russia

== See also ==
- Sviridova (disambiguation), the feminine counterpart of Sviridov
