= Perovsky =

Perovsky (feminine: Perovskaya) is a surname. Notable people with the surname include:

- Nikolay Perovsky (1785–1858), Russian politician
- Sophia Perovskaya (1853–1881), Russian revolutionary
- Olga Perovskaya (1902–1961), Soviet writer
- Vasily Perovsky (1794–1857), Russian general and statesman

== See also ==
- 2422 Perovskaya, a celestial object
