= American Library in Paris =

English-language lending library in Paris, France

Coordinates: 48.8589°N 2.2990°E

- Location: Paris, France
- Established: 1920; 106 years ago

Access and use
- Population served: 2,235,963 (city), 11,797,021 (metro)

Other information
- Director: Audrey Chapuis
- Employees: 12
- Website: americanlibraryinparis.org

The American Library in Paris is the largest English-language lending library on the European mainland. It operates as an independent, non-profit cultural association in France incorporated under the laws of Delaware. Library members have access to more than 100,000 books and periodicals (of which 20,000 books, magazines, and CDs are for children and teens), plus reference and research resources in paper and electronic form. The library serves nearly 5,000 members from more than 60 countries.

The library was established in 1920 under the auspices of the American Library Association's Library War Service with a core collection of books and periodicals donated by American libraries to United States armed forces personnel serving their allies in World War I.

== History ==
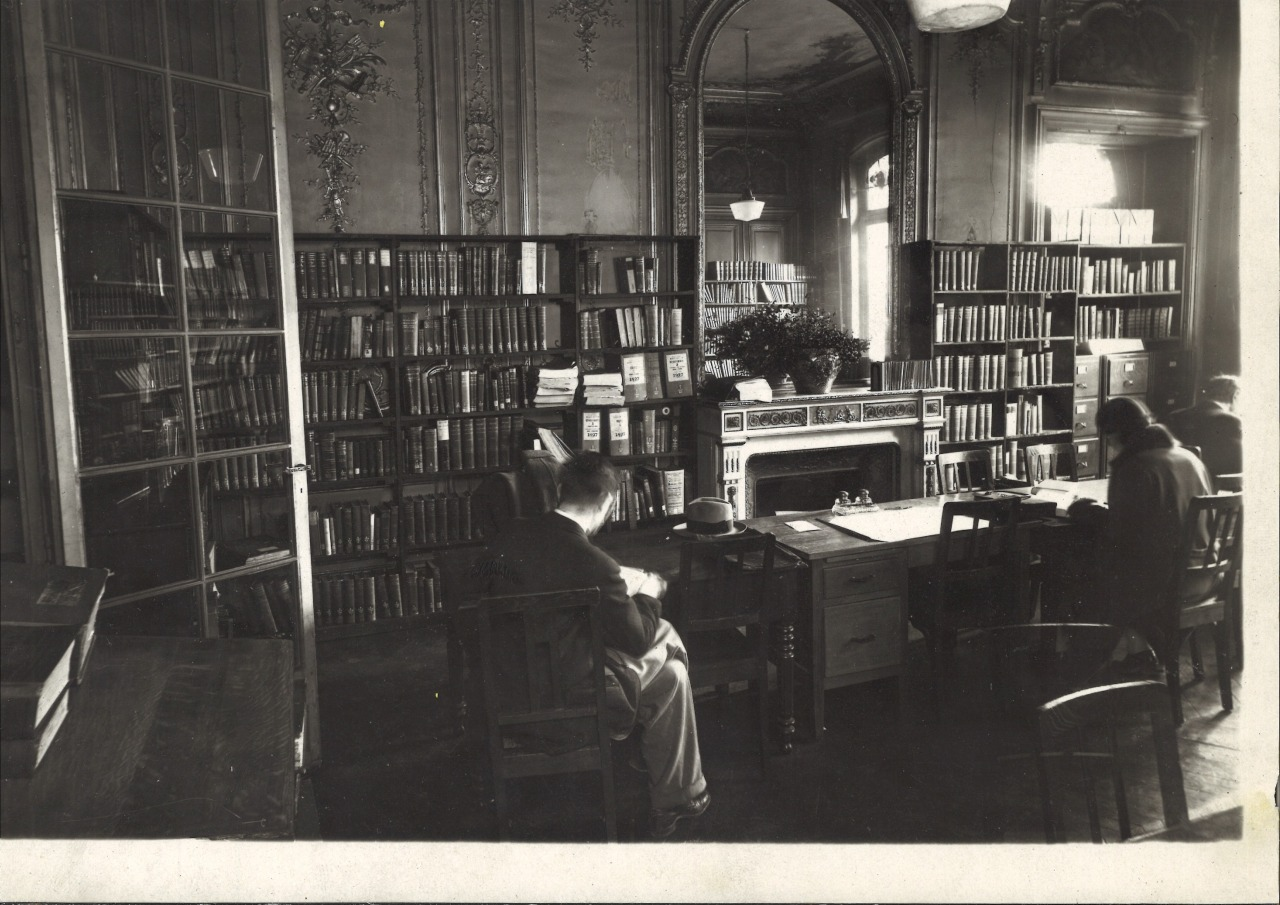
A reading room at the American Library in Paris, 10 rue de l'Élysée, circa 1927

=== Founding ===
Toward the end of World War I, when the United States entered the conflict, hundreds of American libraries launched the Library War Service, a massive project to send books to the troops fighting in Europe. By the Armistice, nearly a million and a half books had been sent across the Atlantic to soldiers. Originally known as the American Library Association's Service for the American Expeditionary Force (AEF) during World War I, the American Library in Paris was formally incorporated under the laws of the state of Delaware in 1920 with a core collection of those wartime books. The Library's motto reflects the spirit of its founding: Atrum post bellum, ex libris lux / After the darkness of war, the light of books. Director Dorothy M. Reeder, a quarter century later, described the library as a "war baby, born out of that vast number of books sent to the AEF by the American Library Association in the last war. When hostilities ceased, it embarked on a new mission, and has served as a memorial to the American soldiers for whom it has been established."

The library was initially located at 10, rue de l’Elysée, the former residence of the Papal Nuncio. The leadership of the early library was composed of a small group of American expatriates, notably Charles Seeger Sr., father of the young American poet Alan Seeger ("I have a rendezvous with Death"), who had died in the war, and great-uncle of the folk singer Pete Seeger. The library's founding was supported in part with an initial gift of 50,000 francs derived from the royalties of Alan Seeger's books Poems and Letters and Diary in 1916 and 1917. Among the first trustees of the library was the expatriate American author Edith Wharton. Ernest Hemingway and Gertrude Stein, early patrons of the library, contributed articles to the library's periodical, Ex Libris, which is still published today as a newsletter. Thornton Wilder and Archibald MacLeish borrowed its books. Stephen Vincent Benét completed his Pulitzer prize-winning book "John Brown's Body" (1928) at the Library. Much of the library staff were American librarians on temporary assignments.

The library's continuing role as a bridge between the United States and France was apparent from the beginning. The French president, Raymond Poincaré, along with French military leaders such as Joffre, Foch, and Lyautey, were present when the Library was formally inaugurated. An early chairman of the board was Clara Longworth de Chambrun, member of a prominent Cincinnati family and sister of the U.S. Speaker of the House of Representatives, Nicholas Longworth. The American Library in Paris quickly became a vital hub of reference services and educational outreach. As noted in an operational report from 1923, within just three years of existence, the library's reference room was visited by 35,000 users: 35% Americans, 33% French, 16% English, and 16% other nationalities. The library was organized using American methods that were new to France at the time and was home to the Paris Library School which in turn introduced modern librarianship to France.

Internationally in Europe, the aftermath of World War I and the model of the American Library in Paris saw the development of the new idea of free, open shelf, card-catalogued libraries in some nations, notably in Czecho-Slovakia and Poland, in the early 1920s. By the end of the decade, the library had been a supplier of approximately 8,000 fiction and nonfiction volumes to 62 academic and public libraries in twenty nations from Central Europe to the Near East. In 1927, the library determined to create a survey of American-related books held in other collections in Paris, and created a virtual library of American Law.

A succession of American librarians directed the Library through the difficult years of the Depression. It was at this time that the first evening author programs took place at the library, drawing prominent French writers including André Gide, André Maurois, Princess Marie Bonaparte, and Colette for readings. Financial difficulties ultimately drove the Library to new premises on the rue de Téhéran in 1936.

=== During World War II ===
The outbreak of World War II, and the subsequent German Occupation of France, made it difficult for the Library to continue to provide its services to the population of Paris, especially to French Jews. In spite of the difficult times, the Library did not ultimately close its doors. Under the leadership of director Dorothy M. Reeder, and later through the efforts of the Comtesse de Chambrun, the Library remained active in various capacities throughout the war.

When Nazi aggression grew, the Library staff quickly prepared the building from potential attack, pasting the doors and windows with paper to fortify the glass in case of bombing and stocking up on gas masks. In spite of the mounting fear in the city, Dorothy M. Reeder asserted, "There was never a thought that we should close." Paying subscriptions continued even as the conflict escalated. Americans who fled Paris with library books in their possession wrote back, promising to return the books safely upon their return.

In a decision that harkened back to the Library's origins in the First World War, Dorothy M. Reeder launched the Soldiers' Service, providing books to British and French troops. Soldiers wrote back to the Library, grateful for the reading material. In February 1940, just five months after the Soldiers’ Service was launched, the Paris-based Herald Tribune reported that 12,000 books had been distributed. All these titles were donated by individuals, organizations, and publishers who responded to the Library's public appeals.

In the spring of 1940, the war reached Paris in the form of the Blitzkrieg. At this point, the Library staff decided to leave the city for their safety, with the exception of Dorothy M. Reeder. Though the Library was closed to the public, Reeder continued to welcome patrons to the Library when they rang and allowed them to check out books. In September, the Library was allowed to reopen in the afternoons. At this time, Doctor Hermann Fuchs, German "Library Protector" and former director of the Berlin Library, visited the American Library in Paris. While his visit was at first a shock to Reeder, they quickly recognized each other from pre-war international library conferences. Fuchs assured Reeder that the Library would continue to be allowed to operate, though it would be bound by the same rules as the Bibliothèque Nationale de France.

One of the most troubling of these rules was the forced exclusion of Jews from the Library. However, this did not stop the American Library in Paris from providing these patrons with books. Dorothy M. Reeder and her staff, as well as the Comtesse de Chambrun, hand-delivered books to Jewish members who were barred from entering the Library. One staff member was shot by the Gestapo when he failed to raise his hands quickly enough during a surprise inspection. When Reeder was sent home for her safety, the Comtesse de Chambrun rose to the occasion to lead the Library. As a result of her son's marriage to the daughter of the Vichy prime minister, Pierre Laval, the library was ensured a friend in high places. That, along with the pre-war esteem of Dr. Hermann Fuchs for Dorothy M. Reeder and the Library, granted the institution a near-exclusive right to keep its doors open and its collections largely uncensored throughout the war. A French diplomat later said the library had been to occupied Paris "an open window on the free world."

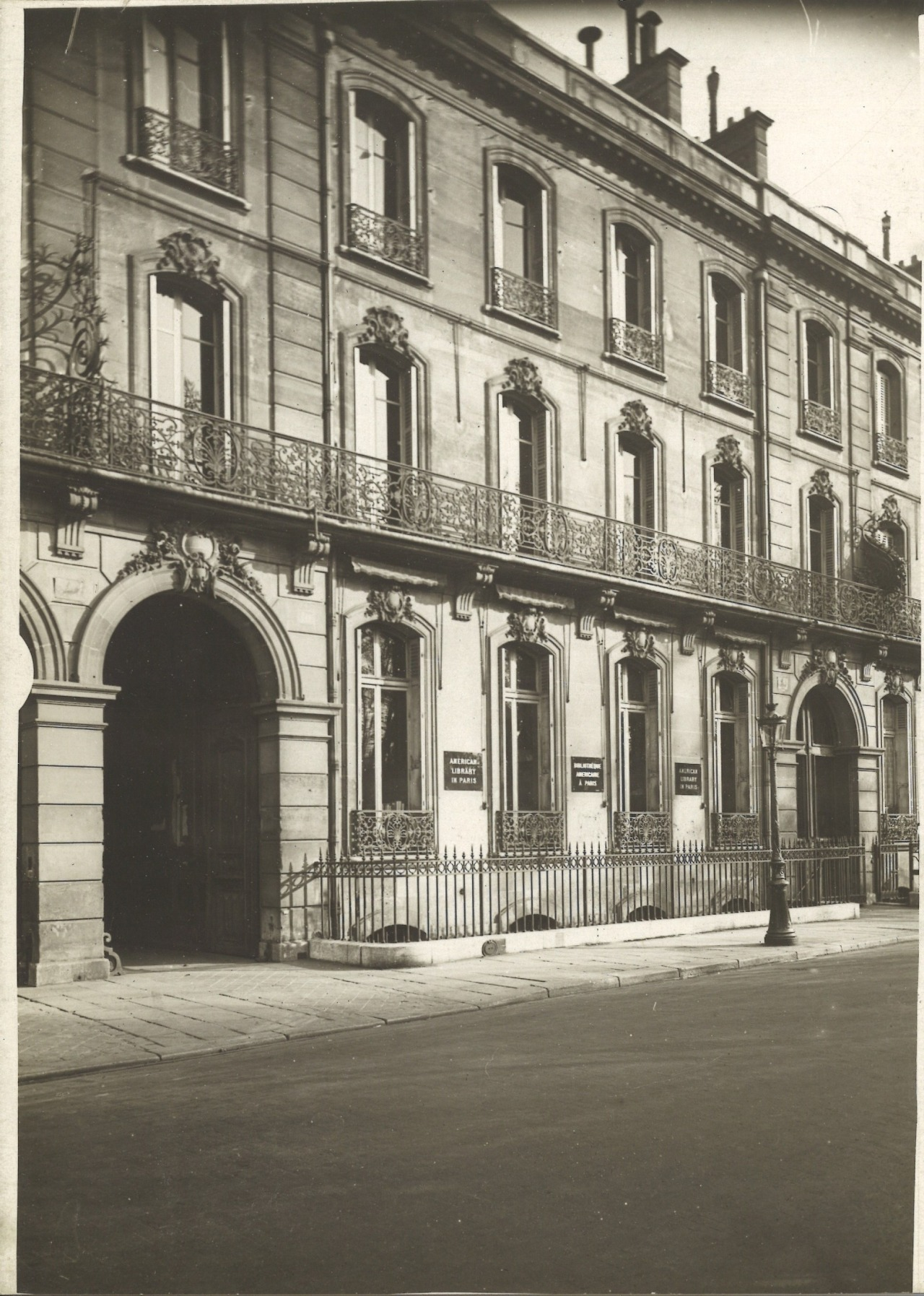
The American Library in Paris at 10 rue de l'Élysée, 75008 Paris (1920–1936)

=== Postwar period ===
The library prospered again in the postwar era as the United States took on a new role in the world. The expatriate community in Paris experienced regeneration, and a new wave of American writers came to Paris and to the library. Irwin Shaw, James Jones, Mary McCarthy, Art Buchwald, Richard Wright, and Samuel Beckett were active members during a period of growth and expansion. It was during this early Cold War period that funds from the United States government permitted the establishment of a dozen provincial branch libraries and the move to larger premises on the Champs-Elysées in 1952. It was there that Director Ian Forbes Fraser barred the door to a high-profile visit from Roy Cohn and David Schine, two aides to Joseph McCarthy, who were touring Europe in search of "red" books in American libraries.

During the Cold War years, American government funds made possible the establishment of a dozen provincial branches of the American Library in Paris. The library moved to the Champs-Elysées in 1952, where it remained for thirteen years. In 1965, the library purchased its current premises on rue du Général Camou, two blocks from the Seine and two blocks from the Eiffel Tower. There, the library helped to nurture the growth of the American University of Paris’s fledgling library. Today, as part of the American University in Paris, that library is its neighbor. The branch libraries ended their connections to the American Library in Paris in the 1990s; three survive under new local partnerships, including the English-language Library in Angers.

=== Recent history ===
By the time of its 75th anniversary in 1995, the Library's membership had grown to 2,000. The premises were renovated in the late 1990s and again in 2011 and 2013, creating an enclosed conference space, an expanded reading room, a refurbished Children's Library, a Teen Mezzanine and new restrooms. In 2016, the Library was transformed by a major renovation that included creating a new façade, new study spaces on the mezzanine and lower levels, a soundproofed reading room, and a members’ lounge. In 2018, membership was reported at 4,224.

== Programs ==
The library hosts free evening presentations by authors, scholars, journalists, and other public figures. Past speakers include: Laurent de Brunhoff, David Sedaris, Amy Tan, Douglas Kennedy, Reza Aslan, Pamela Druckerman, Richard Ford, Diane Johnson, Kwame Alexander, David Lebovitz, Patricia Wells, Viet Thanh Nguyen, Ta-Nehisi Coates, Colson Whitehead, Jacqueline Woodson, Rachel Kushner, Ottessa Moshfegh, Richard Russo, and Kristen Roupenian.

The library also hosts programs and author events for children, teens and families. Activities for children include Toddler Time, Wednesday Story Hour, weekend programs, workshops, and book clubs. Clubs for teenagers include the Teen Writing Group, Teen Advisory Group, Master Shot Film Club, and Youth Leadership Program.

The Young Authors Fiction Festival (established 2001) is held annually in the spring, and is "open to all students ages 5–18 in the greater Paris area who write in English."

== Visiting Fellowship & Writer-in-Residence ==
The American Library in Paris established the Visiting Fellowship in 2013 to "nurture and sustain cross-cultural intellectual discourse."

Past fellows include Rhae Lynn Barnes (summer 2019), Molly Antopol (summer 2019), Ian Leslie (spring 2019), Hala Alyan (fall 2018), Vanessa Manko (spring 2018), James Verini (fall 2017), Jacqueline Woodson (spring 2017), Anna Leahy and Doug Dechow (fall 2016), Megan Mayhew Bergman (spring 2016), Lan Samantha Chang (fall 2015), Susan Hiner (spring 2015), Ta-Nehisi Coates (winter 2016), Alex Danchev (fall 2014), and Anthony Flint (fall 2013).

A Writer-in-Residence position was created in 2018, for a visiting writer selected by the library. Previous appointees are Amanda Gorman (2020), Geraldine Brooks (2020), and Viet Thanh Nguyen (2018).

== Annual Gala ==
The American Library in Paris hosts an annual gala fundraising dinner, usually featuring a guest speaker. Past speakers include: Maureen Dowd (2024); Andrew Sean Greer (2023); Ann Patchett (2022); Zadie Smith (2021); Susan Orlean (2020); Martin Amis (2019); Salman Rushdie (2018); Stacy Schiff (2017); John Irving (2016); Michael Chabon (2015); Antony Beevor (2014); Joyce Carol Oates (2013); Sebastian Faulks (2012); Scott Turow (2011); Christopher Buckley (2010); Laurent de Brunhoff and Alison Lurie (2009); Adam Gopnik (2008); Antonia Fraser (2006); Gonzaque Saint Bris and Eric Frechon (2005); Paul Auster (2004); Louis Auchincloss (2003); Alberto Manguel (2001); 80th anniversary at the Musée Jacquemart-André (2000); Gore Vidal (1999); Gregory Peck (1998); Philippe de Montebello (1997); William Styron (1996); 75th anniversary at the Château de Versailles (1995); Kay Rader (1994); Lee Huebner (1993); Flora Lewis (1992); Philippe Labro (1991); Helmut Newton (1990); Edward Behr (1989).

== Book award ==
The American Library in Paris Book Award was created in 2013 with a donation from the Florence Gould Foundation. The Book Award carries a $5,000 prize and is given annually to a "distinguished" book, written originally in English, about France or the French. The 2024 award was presented to writer Adam Shatz for his book A Rebel's Clinic: The Extraordinary Lives of Frantz Fanon on November 7, 2024.

Past winners include:

- 2024 – The Rebel's Clinic: The Revolutionary Lives of Frantz Fanon by Adam Shatz
- 2023 – Joan: A Novel by Katherine Chen
- 2022 – France: An Adventure History by Graham Robb
- 2021 – Black Spartacus: The Epic Life of Toussaint Louverture by Sudhir Hazareesingh
- 2020 – The Plateau by Maggie Paxson
- 2019 – Hate: The Rising Tide of Anti-Semitism in France (and What it Means for Us) by Marc Weitzmann
- 2018 – A Certain Idea of France: The Life of Charles de Gaulle by Julian Jackson
- 2017 – The Novel of the Century: The Extraordinary Adventure of Les Misérables by David Bellos
- 2016 – The Burdens of Brotherhood: Jews and Muslims from North Africa to France by Ethan B. Katz
- 2015 – The Marquis: Lafayette Reconsidered by Laura Auricchio
- 2014 – An Officer and a Spy by Robert Harris
- 2013 – Embers of War: The Fall of an Empire and the Making of America's Vietnam by Fredrik Logevall.

== In popular culture ==
The 2022 novel, The Paris Library, by Janet Skeslien Charles, is based on the librarians at the American Library in Paris during World War II. Kirkus Reviews described it as "A novel tailor-made for those who cherish books and libraries".

== See also ==
- Libraries in Paris
- Polish Library in Paris - Oldest Polish-cultural institution outside of Poland
- Turgenev Library in Paris - Oldest Russian-language library outside of Russia
- List of libraries in France
