= Berdyaev =

Berdyaev or Berdyayev (Russian: Бердяев) is a Slavic masculine surname, its feminine counterpart is Berdyaeva or Berdyayeva. It may refer to:

- Lydia Berdyaev (1871–1945), Russian poet, wife of Nikolai
- Nikolai Berdyaev (1874–1948), Russian religious and political philosopher
  - Minor planet 4184 Berdyayev named after Nikolai Berdyaev
