= Vaneyev =

Vaneyev or Vaneyeva (Russian: Ванеев, Ванеева) is a Russian-language family name.

The surname may refer to:

- Anatoly Vaneyev (1872–1899), Russian revolutionary
- Larisa Vaneeva, Russian writer
- Olena Vaneeva, Ukrainian mathematician
- Vladimir Vaneev, Ossetian writer
