= Dorothy M. Reeder =

American librarian

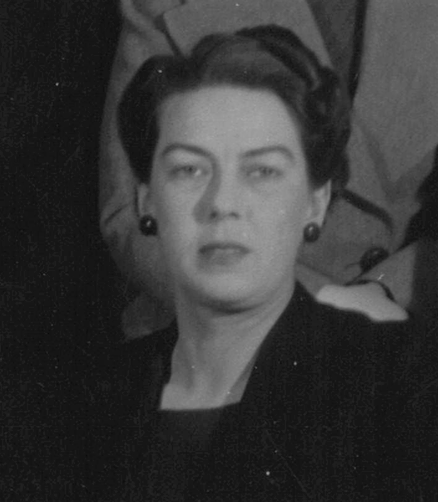
Dorothy M. Reeder, Director of the American Library in Paris, circa 1940

Dorothy Mae Reeder (June 21, 1902 – March 15, 1957) was an American librarian who dedicated her professional life to government and public service. She served as Directrice of the American Library in Paris (1936–1941) and as special advisor to the National Library and Ministry of Education in Bogotá, Colombia where she organized the country's first free lending library (1941–1943). She also served the American Red Cross in Europe (1943–1947) and worked for the Library of Congress.

== Education and early life ==
Dorothy M. Reeder was born in Philadelphia, Pennsylvania on June 21, 1902. She was the daughter of Samuel Bye Reeder and Lillian Mae Lingo Reeder, and had a younger brother, Samuel Bye Reeder Jr. A year after her birth, the Reeder family moved to Washington, D.C. where her father took up work as a plate printer for the Bureau of Engraving and Printing. She attended Central High School in Columbia Heights before graduating in May 1919 from Paul Institute, a girls' boarding school founded by attorney, law professor, author, and suffragette Nanette B. Paul, where she studied Library Science and French.

== Career ==
=== Early years ===
Reeder first worked as a clerk for the Treasury Department. She then became a librarian employed by the Library of Congress from 1925 to 1929. In 1929, the Library of Congress sent her to the Ibero-American Exposition (May 9, 1929 – June 21, 1929) in Seville, Spain to provide assistance in the American building, which featured an extensive library of books on American literature and culture.

=== American Library in Paris ===
Reeder remained in Europe and joined the staff of the American Library in Paris in September, 1929, as assistant in the circulation department, working under Director Burton E. Stevenson. The American Library was then at its original location at 10 rue de l'Élysée in Paris's 8th arrondissement, across from the French presidential palace. Reeder resided not far from the Library at 50 rue Jacob in the Saint-Germain-des-Prés neighborhood in the 6th arrondissement.

In 1930, Reeder became head of the Periodical Department at the American Library and moved to 220 Boulevard Saint-Germain. Her role and duties at the Library grew over time. In 1934, she became a member of the committee that determined the acquisition budget for books and periodicals. In 1935, she took on all publicity for the Library and became its General Secretary. She also organized events such as Book Week. The following year, the Library's Board of Trustees named her acting director, and Reeder oversaw the Library's move to 9 rue de Téhéran in Paris's 8th arrondissement. The Library's new building was inaugurated on Thanksgiving Day, 1936. Reeder was named Director of the Library in 1938.

=== War and Occupation of Paris ===
Days after war was declared, Reeder organized the American Library's Soldiers' Service, which sent over 100,000 books to British and French soldiers by the end of June 1940. The Soldiers' Service was discontinued as German occupation of Paris loomed, and Reeder urged her staff to leave the city. Reeder remained in Paris, overseeing the Library and assisting the American Embassy as their representative at the Hotel Bristol. She resided at the Bristol from June 14 to December 1, 1940, tasked with verifying that only American passport holders were admitted, and informing all others they could not live there.

Reeder left her post as Director of the American Library in Paris in June 1941, and submitted a lengthy confidential report to the Board of Trustees detailing life at the Library since September 1939. Franco-American Countess Clara Longworth de Chambrun, a longtime Library trustee, was named acting director.

=== Special Advisor to the National Library of Colombia ===
Shortly after Reeder's return to the United States on July 19, 1941, the Library of Congress sent her to the Biblioteca Nacional in Bogotá, Colombia as part of an inter-American collaboration program between the American Library Association and libraries in Colombia, Peru, and Mexico. The program was supported by funding from the Rockefeller Foundation. In 1942, Reeder supervised the creation and opening of Colombia's first circulating library, modeled after an American public library with all books classified under the Dewey Decimal System. She also organized the National Library's first general open-shelf reference collection.

=== American Red Cross ===
Reeder served with the American Red Cross in Europe from 1943 to 1947, first in England setting up Red Cross clubs for American soldiers. She returned to Paris just days after the city was liberated to set up the Red Cross War Relief's communications offices for western Europe.

=== Library of Congress ===
After several years of employment in “government service” (1948–1954), Reeder was reappointed as reference assistant at the Library of Congress in early 1956.

== Death and legacy ==
Reeder was hospitalized at National Institutes of Health in December 1956, and she died on March 15, 1957. Her funeral was held in Miami, FL on March 19, 1957.

Reeder's experiences during the Occupation are fictionalized in the novel The Paris Library by American author Janet Skeslien Charles.
