= Nadezhda Lappo-Danilevsky =

Russian writer (1874–1951)

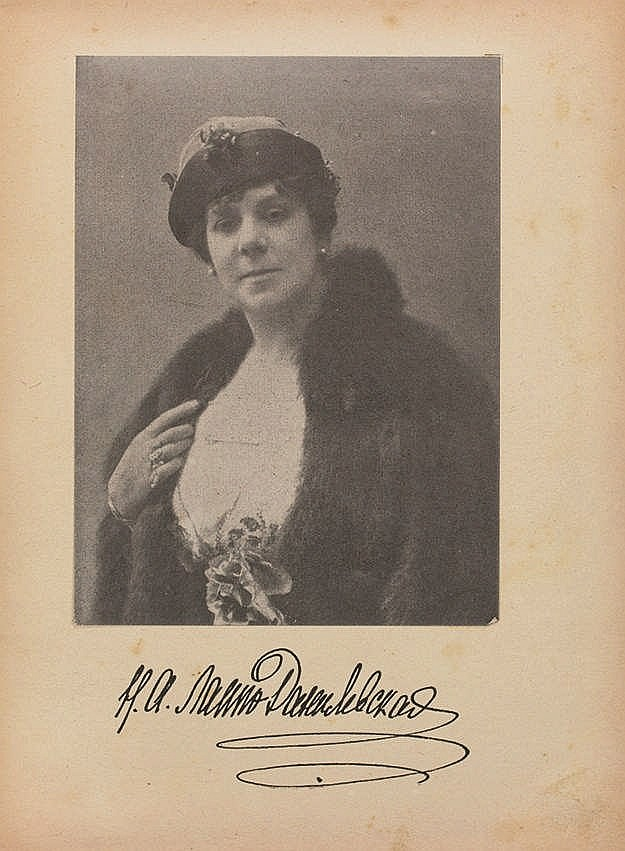
LD NA Berlin 1921.jpg

Nadezhda Lappo-Danilevsky (born in 1874, Kiev, Russian Empire - died on March 17, 1951, Charolles, Department of Saône-et-Loire, France) was a Russian writer and a member of Russian apostolate.

== Biography ==
She was born into a military family, graduated from the Saint Petersburg Institute of Elizabethan, traveled to Europe and lived in Italy, where she made her debut as a singer in the lyrical La Scala Opera House in Milan. In 1898 Danilevsky married Sergei Sergeyevich Lappo-Danilevsky, the younger brother of the historian Alexander Lappo-Danilevsky. After 1917 Nadezhda unsuccessfully tried to cross the border with Finland, was arrested and kept in jails of the Cheka, in 1920 with her children fled to Latvia. She lived in Warsaw and Berlin. In 1923 in Rome, it was received in audience by Pope Pius XI, and in 1924 in Paris she converted to Catholicism from Russian Orthodoxy. She was among the founders and active members of the Holy Trinity parish in Paris and participated in pastoral projects addressing charitable work, published in the parish edition of " Our parish ".

== Creativity ==
The first publication of the author published in 1911 was the poem "When the darkness of night ... will fall." Next Lapo-Danilevskaya became known as a writer for his novels: in 1911 published "In the mist of life" in 1912 - "Wife Minister" (Special Edition - 1913 and called "empty shell" came reprint in Riga in 1927). In 1914 published "Princess Mara" and wrote the following "Russian master," is the most famous work of Lapo-Danilevsky. In the novel, on the background of the family drama of the main characters in the image of the illiterate rural priest guessed figure Grigori Rasputin. The novel "Tinsel" published in 1916, in 1917 - "long life" (reprint in Berlin in 1922). While still in Petrograd conceived series under the title "collapse", consisting of parts of the "collapse", "collapse", "On whom wine," and "Let there be light," a work was published in Berlin in 1921 - 1922. In 1922 she wrote a novel "Catherine Nikitishna" also published in Berlin. Catholic subjects begins clearly present in the works of the writer from the novel "Fortunately," written in Paris in 1925 and then continued in the story in 1926, "had a row", as it is devoted to Russian Catholics. Immigration and the role of personal awareness of this phenomenon. Subject prerevolutionary Russia shows novels "The Manor" (Paris, 1928), and "Millions Burlakova" (first published in Riga in 1929, and the second, entitled "On the Volga" reprinted in Shanghai in 1937. According to the accounting literature issued in Turgenev Library in Paris, in 1930 Lappo-Danilevsky was among 15 of the most widely read authors. However, critics raised on the ideals of public service, were sometimes unfairly harsh on her works.

== Death ==
Danilevsky died on March 17, 1951, in Charolles, Department of Saône-et-Loire, France.

== Works ==
In the fog of life. 1911.

In the estate. Paris. 1928.

In the estate. Paris. 1928.

Long life. 1917 (pereizd. Berlin. 1922)

Catherine Nikitishna. Berlin. 1922.

Wife of the Minister. 1912. (Pereizd. 1913)

Fortunately. 1925.

Princess Mara. Pg. 1914

The collapse of the (Army). Berlin. 1922.

Little Woman: Novels and Stories. Pg. 1918.

Millions Burlakova. Riga. 1929.

Tinsel. 1916.

On the Volga. Shanghai. 1937.

Petrograd outline: Essay / / Breaking News. Revel. 06.5.1921, № 106. pp. 1–2.

Letter of women around the world / / Breaking News. Revel. 24.11.1921, № 283. C. 3.

Outraged. 1926.

Empty shell. Riga Edition Didkovsky M., 1927. 192 p.

The collapse of 1916-1917.

Russian master. Pg. 1915

Scenes Petrograd life / / Breaking News. Revel. 13/01/1921. Number 8. C. 2.; 21.4.1921, № 92. pp. 2–3.
