= Irina Karnaoukhova =

Ukrainian-Russian children's writer and folklorist (1901–1959)

- Карнаухова Ирина Валериановна
- Born: 20 November 1901; Kyiv, Russian Empire
- Died: 13 April 1959 (aged 57); Leningrad, USSR
- Education: Russian State Institute of Art History
- Writing career
- Notable work: Russkie bogatyri (1949)

Irina Valerianovna Karnaoukhova (Russian: Карнаухова Ирина Валериановна, Ukrainian: Карнаухова Ірина Валеріанівна, 20 November 1901 NS – 13 April 1959) was a Ukrainian-Russian children's writer, folklorist and collector of fairy tales. She published collections of folk tales, wrote her own children's stories and hosted a children's radio show.

== Family, education and early life ==
Karnaoukhova was born on 20 November 1901 in Kyiv, then in the Russian Empire, now in Ukraine. Karnaoukhova's mother Alla Mitrofanovna Karnaukhova (Russian: Алла Митрофановна Карнаухова) worked in the editorial offices of Kyiv newspapers. Her father was a railroad employee.

After completing her schooling in Kyiv, Karnaoukhova worked as a librarian for the Department of Public Education. In 1922, Karnaoukhova moved to Petrozavodsk to live with her mother's family. She studied advanced courses at the Russian State Institute of Art History [ru]. She became friends with figures of Russian literature such as Anna Akhmatova, Korney Chukovsky, Sophia Tolstaya, Maximilian Voloshin and Yevgeny Zamyatin, holidaying with Tolstaya and Voloshin in Koktebel in the Crimea. Among this literary circle, she was known as a performer of Russian folk tales. Karnaoukhova claimed that all women were tellers of folk tales and that not all men were, but those men who did had a wider repertoire as they could leave their homes travelling and collect new stories.

In 1926 to 1932, Karnaoukhova participated in northern folklore collecting expeditions to Mezen, Pechora, Pinega, Pomorie and Zaonezhye with Russian State Institute of Art History's Peasant Art Study Section. She collected folk legends, fairy tales, songs and music.

At the outbreak of World War II, Karnaoukhova was working at the boarding camp of the Leningrad Summer Fund. She and the children were evacuated from near the Eastern Front to the Molotov region, where she worked as a teacher until 1944. After the war, she moved to Leningrad.

== Writing ==
In 1930, Karnaoukhova joined the All-Russian Writers' Union [ru]. Around this time, she hosted a children's radio show on the nationwide Leningrad Radio (the precursor to 5TV) called Russian: Сказки бабушки Арины, romanized: Tales of grandmother Arina.

In 1934, Karnaoukhova published Skazki i predaniia severnogo kratia (Tales and Traditions of the Northern Region), using material collected during her northern folklore research, on "the state of the tale or poetic creative work of the peasant strarta of a specific territorial region in a specific section of time."

In 1949, Karnaoukhova released Russkie bogatyri (Russian Heroes), a "clean" retelling of traditional bylina epic heroes for children, where the male protagonists had no psychological struggles or doubts about their loyalty to Russia and courageously fought for the honour of their homeland. The book was popular and was republished in 1963.

== Select publications ==
- Skazki i predaniia severnogo kratia (Tales and Traditions of the Northern Region), 1934
- Russkie bogatyri (Russian Heroes), 1949, republished in 1963
- Eluosi yong shi (Brave Russian fighters), 1953

== Death ==
Karnaoukhova died on 13 April 1959 in Leningrad, USSR, aged 57.
