= Megan Mayhew Bergman =

American novelist

- Born: 1979 or 1980 (age 45–46)
- Education: Duke University; Bennington College (MFA); Wake Forest University
- Writing career
- Genres: short stories, environmental journalism
- Notable awards: Garrett Award for Fiction. Reed Environmental Journalism Award.

Megan Mayhew Bergman (born 1979 or 1980) is an American writer and environmental journalist. She is the author of the books Almost Famous Women, Birds of a Lesser Paradise, and How Strange a Season, as well as a forthcoming biography on the International Sweethearts of Rhythm. In 2015, she won the Garrett Award for Fiction.

== Life ==
She graduated from Duke University with a masters and Bennington College with an MFA.

She is the author of the short story collections Birds of a Lesser Paradise, Almost Famous Women, and How Strange a Season, which was longlisted for the 2023 Joyce Carol Oates Literary Prize, The Story Prize, and the Mark Twain American Voice in Literature Award. In 2016, she was awarded a fellowship at the American Library in Paris. The New Yorker included How Strange A Season in its Best Books of 2022.

In 2019, she wrote a column for The Guardian on the American south and climate change, which won the Reed Environmental Journalism Award from the Southern Environmental Law Center. She writes regularly for The Guardian and The New Yorker on environmental issues, art, and music.

She also wrote an environmental column for The Paris Review in 2016. Her work has twice appeared in Best American Short Stories, and on NPR's Selected Shorts.

She served as the associate director of the MFA program at Bennington College from 2015 to 2017, and later the Director of the Robert Frost Stone House Museum. She is now the Director of the Bread Loaf Environmental Writers Conference at Middlebury College, where she also teaches in the undergraduate Creative Writing Department. She lives in Shaftsbury, Vermont with her husband and two daughters.

She was a senior fellow at the Conservation Law Foundation in Boston, MA from 2019 to 2020 and founded a nonprofit called Open Field, dedicated to increasing access to environmental storytelling skills.

== Works ==
- Almost Famous Women: Stories. Scribner. 6 January 2015. ISBN 978-1-4767-8657-5.
- Birds of a Lesser Paradise: Stories. Simon and Schuster. 6 March 2012. ISBN 978-1-4516-4335-0.
- How Strange A Season. Simon and Schuster. 29 March 2022. ISBN 978-1-4767-1310-6.
