= Veniamin Blazhenny =

Belarusian poet

Veniamin Mikhailovich Eisenstadt (Belarusian: Веніямін Міхайлавіч Айзенштат; 15 October 1921, Kopys – 31 July 1999, Minsk), known by his pen name Veniamin Blazhenny (Russian: Вениамин Михайлович Блаженный), was a Belarusian Christian poet. His pseudonym, "Blazhenny" means Fool for Christ or "blessed".

== Biography ==
Blazhenny was born into a poor Jewish family. After studying for a year in the Vitebsk Teachers' Institute (the institute was evacuated during World War II in 1941), he worked as a history teacher. In 1946, he returned to Belarus and lived in Minsk. He worked as a bookbinder and a photographer in a manufacture team for people with disabilities. He started writing his first poetry in 1943 and had a correspondence with Boris Pasternak, Viktor Shklovsky and Arseny Tarkovsky who admitted his talent. However, his work remained unpublished and unknown to the public due to censorship and other publishing constraints in the Soviet Union. Being on the lowest-paying jobs and having his poetry unpublished, Blazenny lived in extreme poverty and was involuntary incarcerated in a Soviet psychiatric institution for having a "delusion" that he was a poet. Blazhenny remained bedridden during the last years of his life and survived because of help from his wife. He died two weeks after her death

The first journal publications by Blazhenny appeared in 1982, and his first book was published only in 1990. He became a central figure of Russian poetry circles in Minsk and influenced other authors, including Dmitry Strotsev. His poetry was set to music and frequently performed as songs by Elena Frolova.

His poetry attracted attention by strong spiritual component and emotion. The most common subjects of his poetry include love, pity, death, destiny and appeal to God. His lyrical hero often complains to God for the suffering of all the small creatures of the world, including people and animals. Sometimes he appears as a yurodivy who sleeps with homeless cats and dogs, suffers from the cold and hunger, bitterly complains to the higher powers for misfortune, and finally dies, but his spirit remains:

Душа, проснувшись, не узнает дома,
Родимого земного шалаша,
И побредёт, своим путем влекома...
Зачем ей дом, когда она - душа?

И всё в пути бредя необратимом
Просторами небесной колеи,
Возьмёт душа моё земное имя
И горести безмерные мои.

Возьмёт не все их, но с собой в дорогу
Возьёт душа неодолимый путь,
Где шаг за шагом я молился Богу
И шаг за шагом изнывал от пут.

Какой-то свет таинственный прольётся
На повороте времени крутом
Но цепь предвечная не разомкнется
Ни на юдольном свете, ни на том.

Translation:

The soul, waking up, will not recognize her house,
The darling earthly shelter.
She will wonder, forced by her destiny...
Why would she need a home when she is a soul?

And moving through the path of no return,
Through the vast expenses of the heavenly track,
The soul will take with her my earthly name
And my immense sorrows.

No, she will not take my every trouble,
But only the unbearable path,
Where step by step I prayed to God,
And step by step I struggled with my earthly limits.

A mysterious light will be spilled
At the turning point of time,
But the timeless chain [of spirit] will not be broken
Neither in this pitiful world, nor in the other.
