= Natalia Malakhovskaia =

Russian feminist and writer (born 1947)

(Anna) Natalia Malakhovskaia (born 1947) is a Russian feminist and writer. In 1979 Malakhovskaia helped found Zhenshchina i Rossiia (Woman in Russia), an underground almanac out of which grew the Mariia Club, an illegal Leningrad feminist organization. She was exiled to Vienna by the government of Leonid Brezhnev in 1980, along with Tatiana Mamonova, Natalia Malakhovskaia and Tatiana Goricheva, leaders of the only autonomous feminist group.
