= Turgenev Library in Paris =

Russian public library in Paris, France

Coordinates: 48.8376°N 2.3494°E

The Turgenev Library (Russian: Русская общественная библиотека имени И. С. Тургенева) is a Russian public library located in Paris, France. The library was founded in 1875. It is the oldest Russian-language library outside of Russia.

== History ==
The library was founded for Russian-speaking emigrants by German Alexandrovich Lopatin, a notable follower of Narodnik movement. The idea was to create a book depository and an accompanying centre for revolutionary youth in France. Lopatin had no means to fund the library, so it was primarily sponsored by Ivan Sergeyevich Turgenev, who lived in Paris at that time. The author's personal books formed a basis for the new library.

On February 15, 1875 Turgenev organised a matinee that brought together prominent cultural workers from Paris; including Ilya Repin, Vasily Polenov, Mark Antokolski, as well as Russian Ambassador Nikolay Alexeyevich Orlov. As a result, 2,000 francs were collected to purchase books and to pay the rent for the library. In 1883, Turgenev died and the library was named after him.

Despite the financial difficulties, the library's holdings kept increasing. It had 3,500 volumes in 1900, 17,000 in 1913, 50,000 in 1925, and 100,000 in 1937. After the 1917 Russian Revolution the library became one of the principal centers for White émigré culture. In 1937, the library gained splendid premises in a fifteenth-century mansion, the so-called Hôtel Colbert in Rue de la Bûcherie. The library held valuable rarities including first printings of Voltaire, François de La Rochefoucauld, Nikolay Karamzin, Sudebnik of Tsar Ivan IV (with the comments of Vasily Tatishchev).

The library was practically destroyed during World War II. In October 1940, all books, pictures, portraits and busts were placed in more than 900 crates and taken to an unknown destination.

The Turgenev Library was partially restored and reopened in 1959. At present, its collection consists of 60,000 books and periodicals.

== See also ==
- American Library in Paris - Largest English-language lending library on the European mainland
- Polish Library in Paris - Oldest cultural institution outside of Poland
- List of libraries in France
