= The Italics are Mine =

Autobiography of Nina Berberova

The Italics are Mine (Russian: Курсив мой, romanized: Kursiv moj) is the autobiography of Nina Berberova. It was first published in the 1960s. It was re-issued in 1992 following the success of her novellas and short story collections, written in the 1930s, which had been rediscovered in the mid-1980s and published by French publishing house Actes Sud.

Berberova was born in Saint Petersburg in 1901. She left Russia in 1922. She and her partner, the poet Vladislav Khodasevich spent time in Czechoslovakia and Berlin before settling in Paris. She left Khodasevich in the mid-1930s. "He fears the world. I do not. He fears the future. I rush towards it." She was part of a circle of literary Russian exiles, and the book has a number of portraits of them, including Boris Pasternak, Maxim Gorky, Marina Tsvetaeva and Andrey Bely. She is critical of Mayakovsky's suicide: "He did not just shoot himself. He shot a whole generation."

She left for the United States in 1950 where she found life freer than in Europe. She became a lecturer in Russian at Princeton University.

== Criticism ==
Clive James has called the book "the best single book written about Russian culture in exile." "Nina Berberova left the Soviet Union the year that Nikolay Gumilev was shot and Anna Akhmatova was proscribed - Berberova's delightful book about her life in the Russian emigration traces the whole tragically fascinating experience of exile far into her old age."
