= Sviridova, Kursk Oblast =

Rural locality in Kursk Oblast, Russia

Sviridova Свиридова
- Village
- Interactive map of Sviridova
- Location of Sviridova Sviridova (Kursk Oblast)
- Coordinates: 51°34′49″N 35°55′48″E
- Country: Russia
- Federal subject: Kursk Oblast
- Administrative district: Oktyabrsky District
- SelsovietSelsoviet: Dyakonovsky

Population (2010 Census)
  - Total: 52
  - Estimate (2010): 52 (0%)

Municipal status
  - Municipal district: Oktyabrsky Municipal District
  - Rural settlement: Dyakonovsky Selsoviet Rural Settlement
- Time zone: UTC+3 (MSK)
- Postal code: 307213
- Dialing code: +7 47142
- OKTMO ID: 38628412116
- Website: djakonovo.rkursk.ru

Sviridova (Russian: Свиридова) is a rural locality (Russian: деревня, lit. 'village') in Dyakonovsky Selsoviet Rural Settlement, Oktyabrsky District, Kursk Oblast, Russia. Population: 52 (2010 census); 66 (2002 census);

== Geography ==
The village is located on the Vorobzha River (a left tributary of the Seym River), 68 km from the Russia–Ukraine border, 20 km south-west of Kursk, 7 km south-west of the district center – the urban-type settlement Pryamitsyno, 5 km from the selsoviet center – Dyakonovo.

Climate

Sviridova has a warm-summer humid continental climate (Dfb in the Köppen climate classification).

== Transport ==
Sviridova is located 10 km from the federal route M-2 Crimea Highway (a part of the European route E105), 1.5 km from the road of regional importance 38K-010 ("Crimea Highway" – Ivanino, part of the European route E38), 5.5 km from the road 38K-004 (Dyakonovo – Sudzha – border with Ukraine), on the road of intermunicipal significance 38H-078 (38K-004 – a part of a selo Dyakonovo: 4th Okolotok), 8 km from the nearest railway station Dyakonovo (railway line Lgov I — Kursk).

The rural locality is situated 31 km from Kursk Vostochny Airport, 112 km from Belgorod International Airport and 229 km from Voronezh Peter the Great Airport.
