= Lyubov Zakharchenko =

Russian musician and poet (1961–2008)

Lyubov Zakharchenko (Russian: Захарченко, Любовь Ивановна; 4 April 1961 – 21 January 2008) was a Russian poet and singer-songwriter.

== Biography ==
Lyubov Zakharchenko was born 4 April 1961, in Rostov-on-Don. She started writing poetry and songs in 1975, when she was 14. She graduated from the Department of Law Faculty of Rostov State University in 1984 as a lawyer and criminologist. After graduation she worked as an investigator and an assistant prosecutor in the prosecutor's office, and taught state law in the University.

In 1986, she won the Grand Prix at the first Soviet all-Union festival of author song where she presented her song "Back Currant" and several others. Bulat Okudzhava called her a "discovery [of the festival] that are so rare". She was later a winner of numerous song competitions and festivals in Kharkiv, Zaporozhye, Novokuybyshevsk and other places. For several years, she was an organizer of song festival "Rostov Metro" in her home town of Rostov-on-Don. The festivals were visited by Elena Kamburova, Zinoviy Gerdt, Viktor Shenderovich and other well known artists.

In the 1990s, she was a member of juries at festivals of art song in Kyiv and St. Petersburg. She also appeared in many television and radio broadcasts.

She was married twice and had three children. On 21 January 2008, she died in Moscow from a heart condition.

== Her poetry and songs ==
Lyubov Zakharchenko created more than a hundred songs on her own poetry, some of which were published in her six music albums and several albums created in collaboration with others. Her work was mostly intimate lyrics, frequently related to Russian history, conscience and politics, such as her popular songs "Black currant" and "They all hindered us..." about controversial Russian soul and "There is a war, but this is not an event" about Chechen War.

While writing her poetry, she had an idea that every person can be viewed as a "Russian doll" that consists of many nested dolls or personalities coming from other people around or from books and ideas by other people. According to reviewers, that is why she wrote so many songs "on behalf" (from a point of view) of other people she met. According to her, she was an extravert who constantly needed other people around to produce her "dolls"

While Lyubov became a highly popular singer-songwriter after the festival she won in 1986, she wrote most her songs only after second marriage in 1996. Her second husband was a theater producer who created several short plays where she performed as a singer and actress, together with several other actors from Moscow Taganka Theater. She worked with enormous dedication during last years of her life, sleeping only a few hours a day, which possibly contributed to her death. According to reviewers, she lived by the song she wrote about herself:

To my joy and trouble,
My fingers froze to the neck.
I sing in Paradise. I sing in Hell.
I sing to my friends and foes!
My voice is my dog
That guards my life on the edge.
God forbid, it will be quiet ...

== Selected discography ==
- We look almost like people
- Reference disk 1

== Links ==
- Her website (mirror site), with her own pictures and original design
- Her site on bards.ru
- A discussion page on Vkontakte dedicated to her
- Incomplete list of her poems
