= Sviridov, Kursk Oblast =

Rural locality in Kursk Oblast, Russia

Sviridov Свиридов
- Khutor
- Interactive map of Sviridov
- Location of Sviridov Sviridov (Kursk Oblast)
- Coordinates: 51°27′47″N 35°59′57″E
- Country: Russia
- Federal subject: Kursk Oblast
- Administrative district: Medvensky District
- SelsovietSelsoviet: Vysoksky

Population (2010 Census)
  - Total: 69
  - Estimate (2010): 69 (0%)

Municipal status
  - Municipal district: Medvensky Municipal District
  - Rural settlement: Vysoksky Selsoviet Rural Settlement
- Time zone: UTC+3 (MSK)
- Postal code: 307043
- Dialing code: +7 47146
- OKTMO ID: 38624408161
- Website: visoksk.rkursk.ru

Sviridov (Russian: Свиридов) is a rural locality (a khutor) in Vysoksky Selsoviet Rural Settlement, Medvensky District, Kursk Oblast, Russia. Population: 69 (2010 census); 78 (2002 census);

== Geography ==
The khutor is located in the Reut River basin (a left tributary of the Seym), 62 km from the Russia–Ukraine border, 30 km south-west of Kursk, 8.5 km north-west of the district center – the urban-type settlement Medvenka, 4 km from the selsoviet center – Vysokoye.

Climate

Sviridov has a warm-summer humid continental climate (Dfb in the Köppen climate classification).

== Transport ==
Sviridov is located 5.5 km from the federal route M-2 Crimea Highway (a part of the European route E105), 14 km from the road of regional importance 38K-004 (Dyakonovo – Sudzha – border with Ukraine), 1 km from the road 38K-009 (M2 Crimea Highway – 38K-004), 2 km from the road of intermunicipal significance 38H-204 (38K-009 – Vysokoye), on the road 38H-206 (38N-204 – Sviridov), 21 km from the nearest railway station Dyakonovo (railway line Lgov I — Kursk).

The rural locality is situated 38 km from Kursk Vostochny Airport, 98 km from Belgorod International Airport and 227 km from Voronezh Peter the Great Airport.
