= Ethan B. Katz =

Judaic scholar and historian

Ethan B. Katz is a scholar of history and Jewish studies at the University of California, Berkeley, US.

He is the author of The Burdens of Brotherhood: Jews and Muslims from North Africa to France, a 2015 winner of the National Jewish Book Award. The book was also awarded the J. Russell Major Prize and the American Library in Paris Book Award. The book traces Jewish-Muslim relations in France and French North Africa using archival research and interviews.

Katz was reportedly considered for a position at the Office to Monitor and Combat Anti-Semitism in the 2021–2025 US Biden administration. He is the co-author of an educational video on antisemitism for an initiative at UC Berkeley, where he has served as Vice Chair of the Chancellor's Advisory Committee on Jewish Life and Campus Climate.

== Selected publications ==
- Katz, Ethan. "Between emancipation and persecution: Algerian Jewish memory in the longue durée (1930–1970)." The Journal of North African Studies 17, no. 5 (2012): 793-820.
- Katz, Ethan B. The burdens of brotherhood. Harvard University Press, 2015.
- Katz, Ethan B., Lisa Moses Leff, and Maud S. Mandel. Colonialism and the Jews. Indiana University Press, 2017.
- Katz, Ethan. "Did the Paris Mosque Save Jews? A Mystery and Its Memory." The Jewish Quarterly Review 102, no. 2 (2012): 256-287.
- Katz, Ethan. "Displaced historians, dialectical histories: George L. Mosse, Peter Gay and Germany’s multiple paths in the twentieth century." Journal of Modern Jewish Studies 7, no. 2 (2008): 135-155.
- Katz, Ethan B., and Maud S. Mandel. "9 “The French Jewish Community Speaks to You with One Voice”: Dissent and the Shaping of French Jewish Politics since World War II." In The Jews of Modern France, pp. 194-227. Brill, 2016.
- Katz, Ethan B. "An imperial entanglement: anti-Semitism, Islamophobia, and Colonialism." The American Historical Review 123, no. 4 (2018): 1190-1209.
- Katz, Ethan B. "Jewish Citizens of an Imperial Nation-State: Toward a French-Algerian Frame for French Jewish History." French Historical Studies 43, no. 1 (2020): 63-84.
- Katz, Ethan B. "How Marine Le Pen Relies on Dividing French Jews and Muslims". The Atlantic. (2017-04-19) Retrieved 2021-05-07.
- Katz, Ethan. "Sartre’s Algerian Jewish Question." In Sartre, Jews, and the Other, pp. 62-74. De Gruyter Oldenbourg, 2020.
- Katz, Ethan B. "Secular French Nationhood and Its Discontents: Jews as Muslims and Religion as Race in Occupied France." In Secularism in Question, pp. 168-186. University of Pennsylvania Press, 2015.
- Katz, Ethan B. "In the Shadow of the Republic: A Century of Coexistence and Conflict." In A History of Jewish-Muslim Relations, pp. 501-520. Princeton University Press, 2013.
- Katz, Ethan B. "Shifting Hierarchies of Exclusion: Colonialism, Anti‐Semitism, and Islamophobia in European History." CrossCurrents 65, no. 3 (2015): 357-370.
- Katz, Ethan B. "Where Do the Hijab and the Kippah Belong? On Being Publicly Jewish or Muslim in Post-Hebdo France." Jewish History 32, no. 1 (2018): 99-114.
- Joskowicz, Ari, and Ethan Katz, eds. Secularism in Question: Jews and Judaism in Modern Times. University of Pennsylvania Press, 2015.
