= Olga Mihaylovna Bebutova =

Russian actress and writer (1879 - 1952)

Olga Mihaylovna Bebutova (Russian: Ольга Миха́йловна Бе́бутова; née Danilova; 1 November 1879 — 26 March 1952) was a Russian actress and writer.

Her popularity was helped by her beauty (she was the winner of a Russian beauty contest in 1906). Her first husband was Prince Bebutov, her second Count Sollogub (she was called the "countess-actress"). She acted in Saint Petersburg theaters. She edited the paper Theater and Sport under the name Countess Sollogub, published novels under the name Princess Bebutova, and published theater chronicles under the name Gurielli. She was famous for being the source of scandals and mystifications. She left Russia after the October Revolution and settled in France, publishing her work in Riga, Latvia. She died in poverty.

She had a daughter, Tamara Nikolaevna Bebutova.

Some of her novels were Dekabristy (The Decembrists, 1906), Zhizn'-kopeika (Life isn't worth a kopeck, 1916), Novaya sila (New strength, 1926), Serdtse tsarevicha (The tsarevich's heart, 1928), and Bor'ba dvukh mirov (The struggle of two worlds, 1931).
