= Yulia Neiman =

Russian poet (1907-1994)

- Born: 22 July 1907; Ufa, Russian Empire
- Died: 1994 (aged 86–87); Moscow, Russia
- Resting place: Vostryakovo Jewish Cemetery
- Education: Moscow Institute of Philosophy, Literature and History
- Writing career
- Pen name: Yu. Novikova
- Language: Russian
- Notable awards: Order of Friendship of Peoples (1987)

Yulia Moiseevna Neiman (Russian: Юлия Моисеевна Нейман; 22 July 1907 – 1994), also known by the pen name Yu. Novikova (Russian: Ю. Новикова), was a Russian Jewish poet, essayist, and translator.

== Biography ==
Neiman's ancestors came from the Netherlands before settling in the Baltic area during the early nineteenth century. Her grandfather Solomon Neiman worked in the medical profession and all of his five sons, including Neiman's father became physicians.

Neiman attended the Higher Literary Academy, a new institution established to provide a five-year course in literature. She was accepted after presenting her manuscript of poetry. She was, however, forced to transfer to another school after it closed down after operating for four years. She graduated in 1930 from the literary faculty of the Moscow Institute of Philosophy, Literature and History.

== Works ==
Her poetry and translations—mostly from the Kalmyk and Avar languages—appeared in the pages of literary periodicals from the 1930s. Her first volume of poetry, Bonfire on the Snow, was printed in 1974, and her second collection, Thoughts on the Way, was released two years later. She published her final collection of verse, Fancies of Memory, in 1990. Her works explored different themes including the war as was the case in her poem 1941, where she recollected her view of the conflict as a child.

== Legacy ==
A street in Elista, Kalmykia is named in Neiman's honour.
