= Anna Kashina =

Russian veterinarian and writer

Anna S. Kashina is a faculty member at the University of Pennsylvania School of Veterinary Medicine, as well as a writer. Originally from Moscow, Russia, she graduated from Moscow State University, and moved to the United States in 1994 and has been living there ever since.

She published her first fantasy novel, The Princess of Dhagabad, which is the first of “The Spirits of the Ancient Sands” trilogy, in 2000. The book is about a romance between an Arabian princess and her djinn who in turn becomes her slave, teacher and steadfast companion. Kashina has published two other books in Russia, one under the pen name Ann Porridge. The Princess of Dhagabad was her first English-language publication.

== English-language novels ==
- The Princess of Dhagabad, The Spirits of the Ancient Sands: BOOK ONE (2000)
- The Goddess of Dance, The Spirits of the Ancient Sands: BOOK TWO (2012)
- Mistress of the Solstice (A fantasy novel set in the world of Russian myth) (2013)
- Blades of the Old Empire, The Majat Code, BOOK ONE (2014)
- The Guild of Assassins, The Majat Code, BOOK TWO (2014) (double Prism Award winner 2015)
- Assassin Queen, The Majat Code, BOOK THREE (2016)
- Shadowblade (2019)
- Lacrimosa of Dana (2023)
- Monstrum Nox (2026)

== Foreign language novels ==
- Mistress of the Solstice (Die Sonnwendherrin) (In German, Deutscher Taschenbuch Verlag, 2008)
- The First Sword (Das Erste Schwert) (In German, Deutscher Taschenbuch Verlag, 2008)
- In the Name of the Queen (In Russian, Moscow, NK, 1996)
