= Yustina Kruzenshtern-Peterets =

Russian-born journalist, poet and author

Yustina Vladimirovna Kruzenshtern-Peterets (Russian: Юсти́на Влади́мировна Крузенште́рн-Пе́терец; June 19, 1903 – June 8, 1983) was a Russian-born journalist, poet, and author.

After spending much of her childhood in Harbin, China, Kruzenshtern-Peterets became a significant contributor to Russian diaspora publications both there and in Shanghai. After the Communist takeover, she left for Brazil and later the United States, where she worked both for Voice of America and for Russian-language media in New York and California. In addition to her journalistic writing, she produced short stories and poetry, which was heavily influenced by her youth in China.

== Birth and family ==
Yustina Kruzenshtern was born in 1903 in Vladivostok, in what was then the Russian Empire. She was descended from the Estonian noble family that included the famous admiral Adam Johann von Krusenstern. Her father, a captain, died fighting in World War I.

== Life in China ==
During the wave of migration amid the Russian Revolution, she emigrated with her mother and brother to Harbin, China, where she had already spent a portion of her childhood while her father was stationed there. Her time in China left a significant impact on her work as a writer, and she would later identify the country as her "second motherland." After settling in Harbin, she began contributing to the local newspaper Gong Bao and magazine Rubezh. She was involved in the young writers association Churaevka, alongside such Russian diaspora writers as Valery Pereleshin, Alexey Achair, and Larissa Andersen.

In late 1930, she moved to Shanghai. There, she worked as a feuilletonist and political columnist for the newspaper Shanghai Dawn from 1931 to 1934, as well as for the English-language North China Daily News, as she spoke fluent English. She was also fluent in French, and translated books from French in this period. In addition to her journalistic writing, she published works of poetry, including the 1946 collection Poems. Book 1. Her work helped her to support her chronically ill mother and brother. While in Shanghai, in 1935, she married the poet Nikolai Peterets, whom she had met in Harbin and moved to Shanghai with. He died young in 1944, of tuberculosis, a tragedy that would mark the rest of Kruzenshtern-Peterets' life.

During World War II, she was a vocal "defencist." She also opposed Zhdanovism, in 1948 publishing the magazine Antigone, which aimed to reflect the "free thought" of Russians in the Far East and contained articles about the life of the intelligentsia in the Soviet Union. Throughout her career, she wrote under many pseudonyms, including Snorre, Sibilla Ven, T. Stern, and Merry Devil.

== Later years ==
Kruzenshtern-Peterets left China for Brazil in the 1950s, following the Chinese Communist Revolution, and then in the early 1960s moved to the United States. There, she spent 10 years working for the Russian department of the U.S. government's Voice of America broadcaster, and she wrote for the New Russian Word newspaper. She also continued to write poetry, and in 1969 she published a short story collection, Ulybka psishi. After her retirement from VOA, she settled in the San Francisco area, where starting in 1982 she worked as an editor for the newspaper Russian Life. She died in San Mateo in 1983, at the age of 79.
