= Olga Arefieva =

Russian singer-songwriter (born 1966)

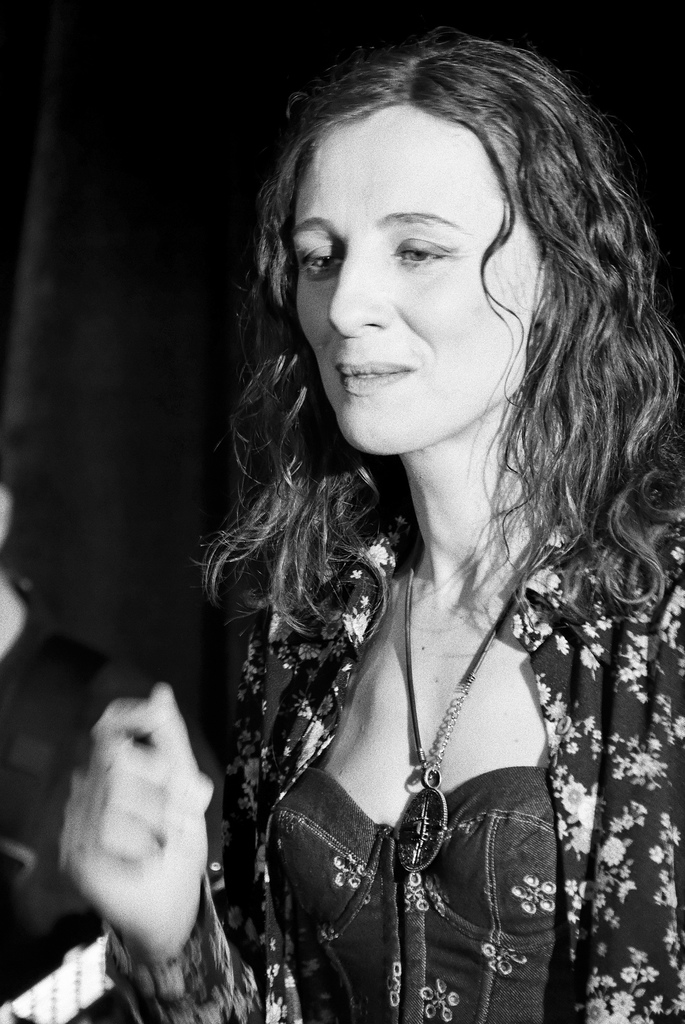

Background information
- Born: Olga Arefieva; 21 September 1966 (age 59); Verkhnyaya Salda, Russia
- Genres: Singer-songwriter, rock, folk, dance, reggae
- Occupations: Singer, composer, poet
- Instrument: Vocals
- Years active: 1985–current
- Website: www.ark.ru/ins/english/index.html

Olga Arefieva (Arefeva, Russian: Ольга Арефьева) (born 1966 in Verkhnyaya Salda) is a Russian singer-songwriter, poet and musician.

Her poetry was described by literary critics as a combination of realism and mysticism, possibly inspired by the absurdism of Daniil Kharms or the magic realism of Gabriel Márquez. She is a member of the Union of Russian Writers.

== Discography ==
- Batakakumba, Arefieva and band The Ark, 2000
- Anatomy, Disk 1 and Disk 2, 2000
- Concert on radio, 2002
- Snow, 2011
- Theater, 2013
- Jan, 2016
- Clay, 2016
- Angel and girl, 2017
- Trybirds, 2017
- Yiao, 2018
- Hina, 2020
- Ko-Mix, 2021
- Amona Fe, 2023
