= Larisa Matros =

Russian poet and academic

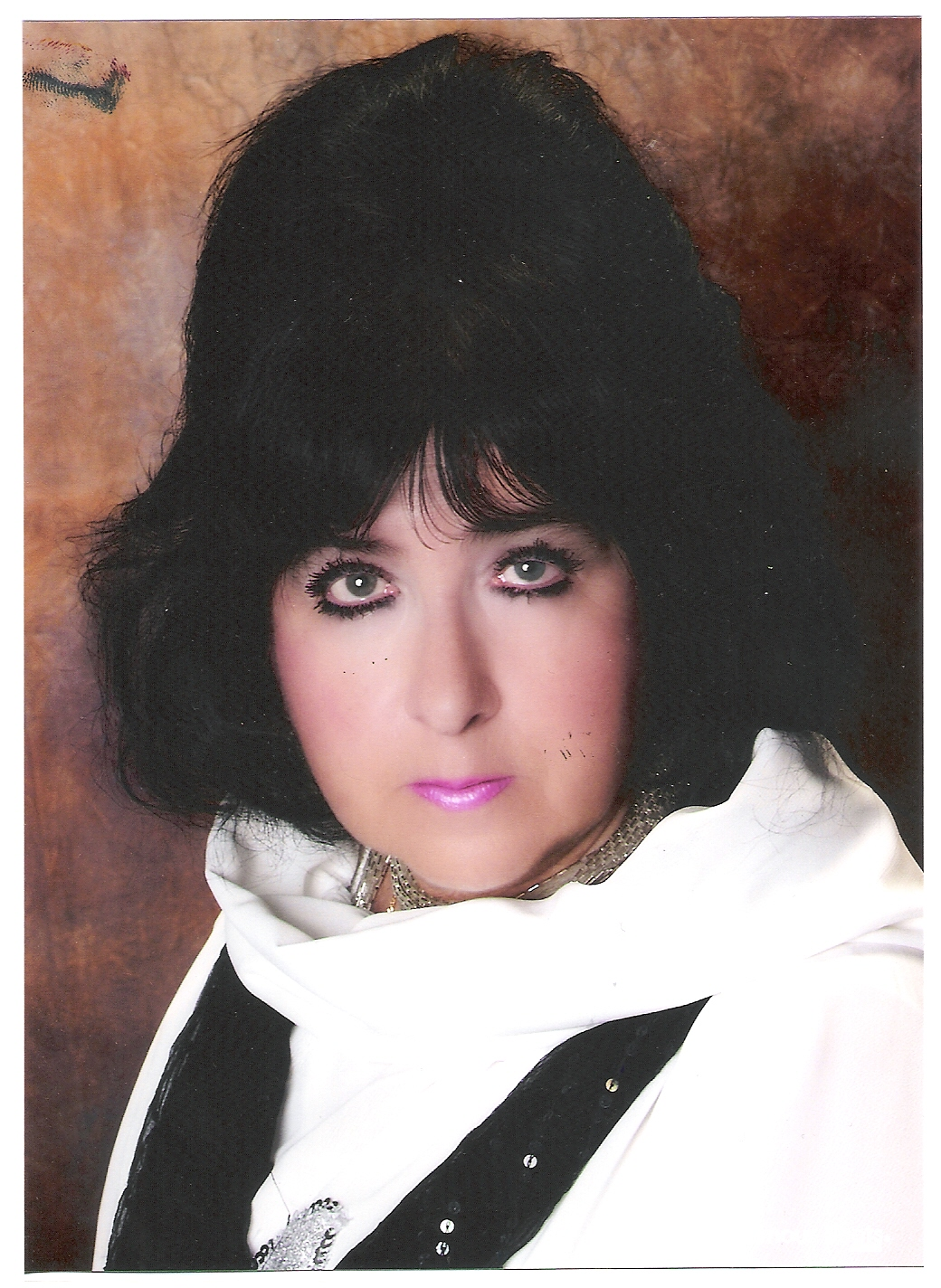
- L. Matros
- Born: Odesa, Ukrainian SSR

Larisa Grigorievna Matros (Russian: Лариса Григорьевна Матрос, Ukrainian: Лариса Григорівна Матрос) is a philosopher and writer of fiction.

== Life and career ==
Matros was born in 1938 in Odesa, Ukraine, where she graduated from the Law Department of the Odesa State University in 1963. The first steps in her career were defined by the legal profession—a job in law enforcement from 1960 to 1962 and a job as a legal adviser in the Trade Company from 1962 to 1964. After moving to Akademgorodok in 1964, L. Matros’ career took a turn, from practicing lawyer to scientist. In Akademgorodok, she started as a post graduate student at the Department of Philosophy of the Novosibirsk State University, where she received a PhD in philosophy in 1972. After that, during the years 1974–1991, she worked in the Siberian Branch of the Academy of Medical Sciences. where eventually she was promoted to the position of chair of the Philosophy Department of the Presidium of the Siberian Branch. During those years Matros published about one hundred scholarly works, including a book The Right to Health [Pravo na zdorovie], with co-author, well-known academician V. Kaznacheev, 1979.

The main publication of Matros that reflects a generalized analysis of her research, is the monograph Social Aspects of Health Problems (Sotsial’nye aspekty problemy zdorovya), which appeared in print in 1992 and became until now one of the basic publications and quotation book in the field of the science of sociology of medicine.

Matros’ research and academic work were always combined with corresponding science-organizing activity".

== Literary activity ==
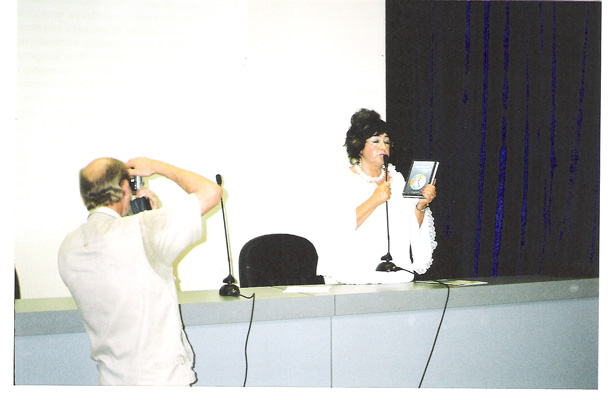
Larisa Matros presents the second part of her dilogy novel It Is Called Life at the House of Scientists in Akademgorodok in June 2007

In 1992 Larisa Matros moved to the United States and turned to literary activity. Since the first years of this period of her life she became engaged in cultural and literary life of both the United States and Russia.

The main publications at this part of Matros’ creative career are two large sociological novels Presumption of Guilt (published in 2000) and It Is Called Life (published in 2007).

In the first novel Matros applies her former scientific experience and knowledge to fiction, in which "alongside fictional characters act real people," well-known persons: politicians, academicians, public figures. It is a novel about the history of Soviet sociology, fate of Russian intelligentsia, humanities scientists, their input into social processes, their hopes, illusions, and disappointments in Khrushchev's reforms and Gorbachev's perestroika. In historical and fictional plots the author addresses the "main theme of the novel [which is] the responsibility of [scientific] intelligentsia for society and the responsibility of society for intelligentsia."

One of the main subjects that made this book special is the historical and sociological analysis of the phenomenon of the world-famous science center in Siberia – Akademgorodok where the author spent 27 years.

She was a winner of the Contest "Russia-France" in 2015 carried out by the Moscow city organization of the Union of Writers of Russia.

== Major publications ==
=== Books ===
- Matros L.G, Social Aspects of Health Problems. (Sotsial’nye aspekty problemy zdorovya), monograph, Nayka, Novosibirsk, 1992.
- Matros, Larisa, And Life, and Tears, and Love, (I jiz’n, i sliozy, i l’ubov’), poetry collection, St. Petersburg, Nasibulin, 1998.
- Matros, Larisa, Presumption of Guilt (Prezumtsiya vinovnosti), sociological novel, Liberty Publishing House, New York, 2000 (first part of dilogy).
- Matros, Larisa, It Is Called Life (Nazyvaetsya jiz’n), sociological novel, Art-Avenue, Novosibirsk, 2007 (second part of dilogy).
- Matros, Larisa, Not So Small Tragedies (Nemalen’kye tragedii), collection of short stories and small novels, M-Graphics, Boston, 2010.
- Matros, Larisa, Geometry of Thoughts (Geometriya myslei), collection of journalist and literary reviews, New York, 2009.
- Matros, Larisa, Asymmetry of the Senses (Assimetriya chuvstv), collection of short stories and essays, New York, 2010.
- Matros, Larisa, Sometimes It Happens (Tak uzh byvaet), New York, 2012.
- Kaznacheev, V. P, Matros L.G, The right to health (Pravo na zdorov’e), Znanie, Moscow, 1979.
- Matros, Larisa, Poeziia russkikh filisofov dvadtsatogo veka. Antologiia [Poetry of 20th-Century Russian Philosophers. An Anthology], collected by M. Sergeev and L. Stolovich, Boston: M-Graphics, 2011, pp. 183–195.

Larisa Matros audio book " Everything Started From Love" St. Petersburg, Writing by Pen. 2015

=== Editor of scientific anthologies ===
- Methodological Problems in Medicine and Biology (Metodologicheskie problemy meditsiny i biologii), Nauka, Novosibirsk, 1985.
- Human Health in the Condition of Scientific and Technological Revolution (Zdorovie cheloveka v usloviakh nauchno-tekhnicheskoi revolutsii), Nauka, Novosibirsk, 1989.
