= Olga Lipovskaya =

Russian feminist (1954–2021)

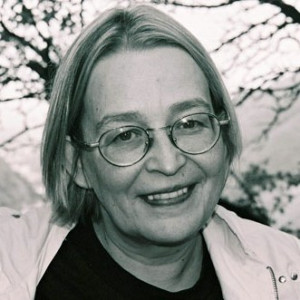

Olga Gennadyevna Lipovskaya (Russian: Ольга Геннадьевна Липовская; 09.02.1954 – 24.08.2021) was a Russian journalist and feminist. Working in Leningrad during the glasnost period from 1989 to 1991 Lipovskaya edited Women's Reading (Женское чтение, Zhenskoe Chtenie), a samizdat journal of about 30 copies per issue that she produced at home and circulated for other women to reproduce and pass along.

Lipovskaya acted as chairperson of the Saint Petersburg Centre for Gender Issues since 1992. She worked as a journalist and interpreter. From 1988 to 1991 she was a member of the Coordinating Committee of the Saint Petersburg branch of the Democratic Union.

In the last years of her life, the writer supported various feminist projects, including the "FemInfoteka" project.

On 24 August 2021, the feminist library "FemInfoteka" published news of her death. She was 67.
