= Nina Berberova =

Russian writer (1901–1993)

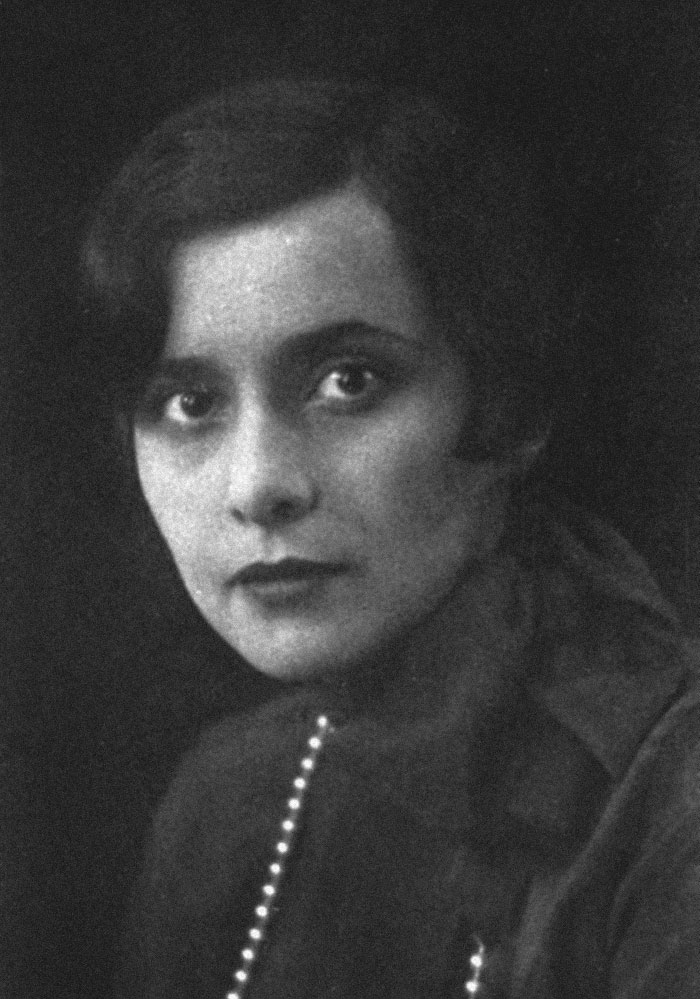
- Born: July 26, 1901; St. Petersburg, Russian Empire
- Died: September 26, 1993 (aged 92); Philadelphia, Pennsylvania, United States
- Occupation: writer

Nina Nikolayevna Berberova (Russian: Ни́на Никола́евна Бербе́рова; 26 July 1901 – 26 September 1993) was a Russian writer who chronicled the lives of anti-communist Russian refugees in Paris in her short stories and novels. She visited post-Soviet Russia. Her 1965 revision of the Constance Garnett translation of Leo Tolstoy's Anna Karenina with Leonard J. Kent was considered by the academic Zoja Pavlovskis-Petit to be the best translation before 2000.

== Life ==
Born in 1901 to an Armenian father and a Russian mother, Nina Berberova was brought up in Saint Petersburg. She emigrated from Soviet Russia to the Weimar Republic in 1922 with the poet Vladislav Khodasevich (who died in 1939). The couple lived in Berlin until 1924 and then settled in Paris. There, Berberova became a permanent contributor to the White émigré publication Posledniye Novosti ("The Latest News"), where she published short stories, poems, film reviews and chronicles of Soviet literature. She also wrote for many other Russian émigré publications based in Paris, Berlin and Prague. The stories collected in Oblegchenie Uchasti ("The Easing of Fate") and Biiankurskie Prazdniki ("Billancourt Fiestas") were written during this period. She also wrote the first book-length biography of composer Pyotr Ilyich Tchaikovsky in 1936, which was deeply controversial at the time for its openness about the composer's homosexuality. In Paris, she was part of a circle of poor but distinguished literary Russian refugees that included Vladimir Nabokov, Marina Tsvetaeva and Vladimir Mayakovsky. From its inception in 1940, she became a permanent contributor to the weekly Russkaia Mysl’ ("Russian Thought").

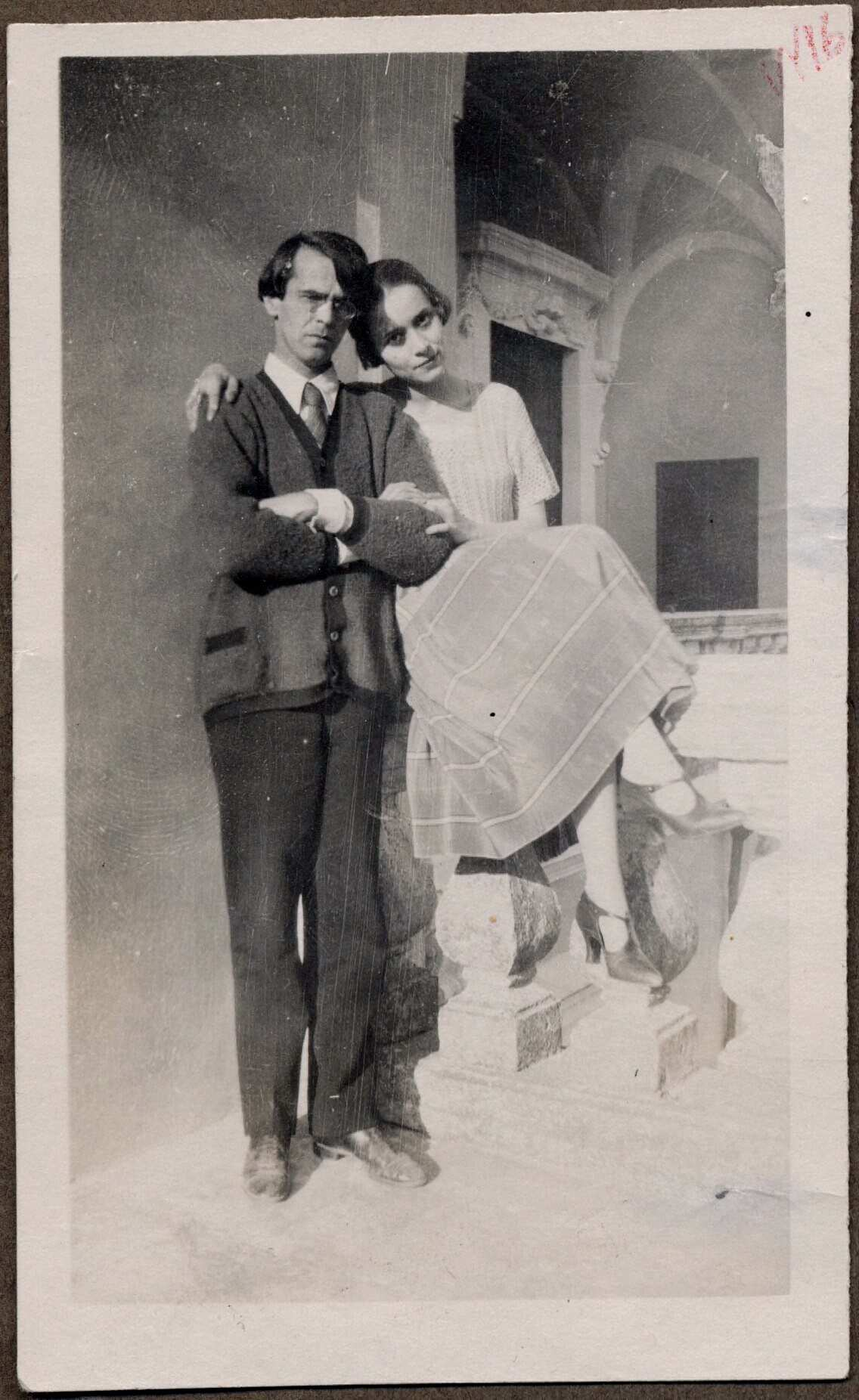
Nina Berberova and her husband, writer Vladislav Khodasevich in Sorrento in 1925

After living in Paris for 25 years, Berberova emigrated to the United States in 1950 and became an American citizen in 1959. In 1954, she married George Kochevitsky, Russian pianist and teacher. She began her academic career in 1958 when she was hired to teach Russian at Yale. She continued to write while she was teaching and published several povesti (long short stories), literary criticism and some poetry. She left Yale in 1963 for Princeton, where she taught until her retirement in 1971. Berberova moved from Princeton, New Jersey, to Philadelphia in 1991.

Berberova's autobiography, which details her early life and her years in France, ending with her move to the United States and her first few years there, was written in Russian but published first in English as The Italics are Mine (Harcourt, Brace & World, 1969). The Russian edition, Kursiv Moi, was not published until 1983.

== English translations ==
- Anna Karenina, with Leonard J. Kent Random House 1965, republished by Modern Library 2000.
- The Accompanist, William Collins Sons, 1987.
- The Italics are Mine, Vintage, 1993.
- Aleksandr Blok: A Life, George Braziller, 1996.
- Cape of Storms, New Directions 1999.
- The Ladies from St. Petersburg, New Directions, 2000.
- The Tattered Cloak and Other Stories, Knopf 1991, reprinted New Directions 2001.
- The Book of Happiness, New Directions, 2002.
- Moura: The Dangerous Life of the Baroness Budberg, NYRB Classics, 2005.
- Billancourt Tales, New Directions, 2009.

== Bibliography ==
- (1920s) Бийанкурские праздники, Biiankurskie Prazdniki ("Billancourt Holidays", stories published in the 1920s in the Parisian Russian language daily Последние новости, Poslednie novosti). English translation: Billancourt Tales, New York : New Directions, 2001.
- (1930) Последние и первый, Poslednie i pervyi ("Last and First")
- (1932) Повелителъница, Povelitel'nitsa ("Mistress")
- (1936) Чайковский: история одинокой жизни, Chaikovskii: istoriia odinokoi zhizni ("Tchaikovsky: The Story of a Lonely Life")
- (1938) Без заката, Bez zakata ("Without a Sunset")
- (1930s) Облегчение участи, Oblegchenie uchasti ("The Relief of Fate", stories published in the 1930s in Современные записки Sovremennye zapiski and collected in 1947)
- (1947) Alexandre Blok et son temps ("Alexander Blok and his time")
- (1969) The Italics are Mine (English version of Курсив мой, Kursiv Moi)
- (1982) Железная женщина, Zheleznaia zhenshchina ("Iron Woman")
- (1986) Люди и ложи, Lyudi i lozhi

== Sources ==
- Barker, Murl G. 1994. In Memoriam: Nina Nikolaevna Berberova 1901–1993. The Slavic and East European Journal 38(3):553-556.
- Kasack, Wolfgang. 1988. Dictionary of Russian literature since 1917. New York: Columbia University Press.
- Buck, Joan Juliet 1993. "Postscript: Nina Berberova." The New Yorker, 25 October 1993.
