= The Princess of Dhagabad =

- Author: Anna Kashina
- Language: English
- Series: The Spirits of the Ancient Sands
- Genre: Fantasy novel
- Publisher: Herodias
- Publication date: 15 May 2000
- Publication place: United States
- Pages: 272 pp
- ISBN: 1-928746-07-1
- OCLC: 43481820
- Dewey Decimal: 813/.54 21
- LC Class: PS3561.A6965 P7 2000
- Followed by: The Goddess of Dance

The Princess of Dhagabad is a 2000 novel, the first book of a trilogy by Anna Kashina.

== Plot introduction ==
The Princess of Dhagabad follows the princess as she grows up, in fictional Dhagabad, into a young woman of seventeen, when she proves that she more than capable of taking her destiny—and the destiny of Dhagabad—into her hands.

== Plot summary ==
The Princess of Dhagabad is the first in a trilogy of fantasy novels. This sensual and vividly imagined novel is about the coming-of-age of an Arabian princess, who is destined to be heiress to the throne of Dhagabad, and her relationship with Hasan, an all-powerful djinn who becomes her slave, teacher and steadfast companion. The Princess of Dhagabad follows the princess as she grows from a child of twelve into a young woman of seventeen, while she proves, against all tradition, that she is more than capable of taking her destiny-and the destiny of Dhagabad-in hand.

Hasan, her devoted djinn, whose power and omniscience crush him under an unbearable burden, gradually releases himself from his centuries-old pain and apathy. He grows to enjoy spending time with his mistress, until one day-against all odds-he discovers a power greater than wisdom or immortality, greater than suffering—love.

== Characters in "The Princess of Dhagabad" ==
- Princess - The Princess of Dhagabad, protagonist
- Hasan the Djinn - The princess' slave djinn
- The Sultan- The princess' father, Sultan of Dhagabad
- The Sultana- The princess' mother, Sultana of Dhagabad

== Major themes ==
- Djinn
- Arabian Nights
- Princesses
- Marriage
- Fictional places

== Release details ==
- 2000, USA, Herodias ISBN 1-928746-07-1, Pub date 15 May 2000, Hardcover

== Sources, references, external links, quotations ==
- Anna Kashina's official book website
