= Margarita Sharapova =

Russian novelist and short story writer (born 1962)

Margarita Sharapova (Russian: Маргарита Шарапова; born 15 April 1962) is a Russian novelist and short story writer whose tales often draw on her former experience as an animal trainer in a circus.

== Biography ==
Born in 1962 in Moscow, Sharapova completed studies at the Film Institute and at the Literature Institute. After working as a shorthand typist, she became an animal keeper and stage assistant for circus performances.

Sharapova's radio play Circus Train, based on her work in a circus, has been broadcast by the BBC. It tells the story of what happens after two circus performers and their huge dog are abandoned by their touring train, bringing them into contact with several eccentric travellers. Several of her other works depict the hardships of Moscow's gay scene made up of broken lives and jealousy between members of the gay community rather than any pressure from the authorities. The extent of violence is clearly brought out in her 2004 novel Moscow, the Station of Lesbos in which the rich, domineering Anastasia kills the 22-year-old drug addict Lucinda for making passes at her lover Masha.

Sharapova has received a number of literary awards and is a member of the Moscow Union of Writers.

As a result of the oppression she had suffered from the authorities in Moscow, in 2013 Sharapova sought political asylum in Portugal. "LGBT literature has no future in Russia," she explained. "When I told the government officials I wrote my stories before the gay propaganda law came into force, they replied 'You wrote before and will answer for it now.'" She is now living in Portugal.
