= Tatiana Aleshina =

Russian singer (born 1961)

Tatiana Aleshina Russian: Татьяна Владимировна Алёшина
- Born: July 3, 1961 (age 64); Nizhyn, Nizhyn Raion, Chernihiv Oblast, Ukraine, USSR
- Website: http://www.asia-plus.ru/cgi-bin/persons.cgi?id=5

Tatiana Aleshina (Russian: Татьяна Владимировна Алёшина, born 3 July 1961, Nizhyn) is a Russian composer, singer-songwriter, theater artist, and poet. She is a music director of the St. Petersburg Demmeni Marionette Theatre, the oldest professional puppet theatre in Russia. She is a member of Union of Theatre Workers of the Russian Federation.

== Biography ==
She was born in the city of Nizhyn. Three months later, her family moved to the closed city of Chelyabinsk-40, and then to the Tula region. She graduated from the School of Music in Kurgan. In 1987 she graduated from the Urals Mussorgsky State Conservatoire. Since 1996 Aleshina works as a music director in the Demmeni Marionette Theatre in St. Petersburg. Since 1992 she collaborates with theater of Elena Kamburova.

== Awards ==
- Honored worker of culture of the Russian Federation

== Selected discography ==
- Her CDs, additional links
- As we were flying on the ball, , songs by Tatiana Aleshina, performed by Elena Kamburova, Elena Frolova, Alena Chie and others
- 2000: I'm not asking for love
- 2002: Seconda Parte, disk in collaboration with creative group AZIA
- 2005: Mandelshtam Street, songs on poetry by Osip Mandelshtam
- 2007: Where are you, father's house...

== Links ==
- Her website in ASIA
- Her website on bards.ru
- Facebook page
- VK page
- Records on her Soundcloud site
