= Anna Barkova =

Russian writer (1901–1976)

- А́нна Алекса́ндровна Барко́ва
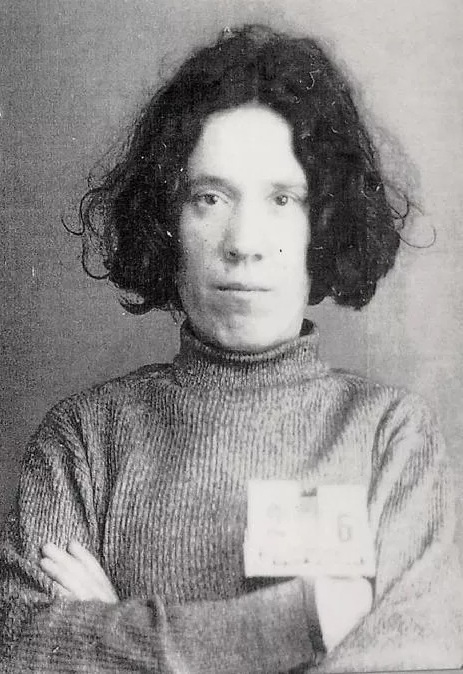
- Barkova after her first arrest in 1934
- Born: Anna Alexandrovna Barkova; 16 July 1901; Ivanovo, Vladimir Governorate, Russian Empire
- Died: 29 April 1976 (aged 74); Moscow, Soviet Union
- Writing career
- Pen name: Kalika perekhozhaia ("the wandering cripple")

Anna Alexandrovna Barkova (Russian: А́нна Алекса́ндровна Барко́ва), 16 July 1901 – 29 April 1976, was a Soviet Russian poet, journalist, playwright, essayist, memoirist, and writer of fiction. She was imprisoned for more than 20 years in the Gulag.

== Early life ==
Anna Alexandrovna Barkova was born into the family of a private school janitor in the textile town of Ivanovo in 1901. She was allowed to attend the school because of her father's position, a rare opportunity for a young working-class girl in pre-revolutionary Russia.

In 1918, she enrolled as a member of the Circle of Genuine Proletarian Poets, a writers group based in Ivanovo. Soon after joining she began to write short pieces for the group's paper The Land of the Workers. She also published poetry in the paper under the pseudonym Kalika perekhozhaia ("the wandering cripple"), a name given to blind or maimed singers who went from village to village singing devotional ballads to obtain alms.

== Literary work ==
Barkova's early poetry attracted the attention of the Bolshevik literary establishment, including the leading critic Aleksandr Voronsky and the Commissar of Enlightenment Anatoly Lunacharsky. Lunacharsky became her patron, and in 1922 she moved to Moscow to act as his secretary. Also in 1922, her first poetry collection Woman was published with a foreword by Lunacharsky. In 1923 her play Nastasya Bonfire was published.

She also attended the writer's school in Moscow directed by Valery Bryusov, and wrote for his paper Print and Revolution. Later, Maria Ulyanova, the sister of Vladimir Lenin, found Anna a position at the paper Pravda, and helped her to put together a second collection of poems that was never published.

== Imprisonment and exile ==
Barkova became increasingly disillusioned with Soviet life in the late 1920s. Her poems of the early 1930s were highly critical of Soviet life and institutions. She wrote in 1925:

Пропитаны кровью и желчью
Наша жизнь и наши дела.
Ненасытное сердце волчье
Нам судьба роковая дала.

Разрываем зубами, когтями,
Убиваем мать и отца,
Не швыряем в ближнего камень-
Пробиваем пулей сердца.

А! Об этом думать не надо?
Не надо—ну так изволь:
Подай мне всеобщую радость
На блюде, как хлеб и соль.

Scarlet blood and yellow bile
Feed our life, and all we do;
Malignant fate has given us
Hearts insatiable as wolves,

Teeth and claws we use to maul
And tear our mothers and our fathers;
No, we do not stone our neighbors,
Our bullets rip their hearts in two.

Oh! Better not to think like this?
Very well, then – as you wish.
Then hand me universal joy,
Like bread and salt upon a dish.

In 1934, Barkova was denounced and arrested, and some of her poetry was used against her as evidence. She was sentenced to five years imprisonment. She endured a repeat arrest in November 1947, when she was sentenced to 10 years imprisonment and five years of restricted rights. Her second conviction was overturned in December 1955 and she was freed. She was rehabilitated in October 1957, then arrested for a third time in November, and sentenced again to 10 years in prison and five years of restricted rights. She was finally freed when this third conviction was overturned in May 1965. She also suffered two periods of exile from 1940 to 1947 (spent in Kaluga) and from 1965 to 1967.

In 1967, she was allowed to return to Moscow after the intervention of a group of writers led by Alexander Tvardovsky and Konstantin Fedin. She lived out the remainder of her life in relative poverty in a communal flat in the Garden Ring, where she preserved her enthusiasm for books, friends, and conversation.

== Film ==
In 2017, a film about her life was released by Czech Television titled 8 hlav sílenství (8 Heads of Madness), starring the popular singer Aneta Langerová. The film is mainly about her life in the camps and the women she loved.

== English translations ==
- A Few Autobiographical Facts and Tatar Anguish, (poems), from An Anthology of Russian Women's Writing, 1777–1992, Oxford, 1994.
