= Olga Perovskaya =

Soviet children's writer (1902–1961)

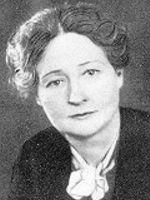
Olga Perovskaya

Olga Vasilievna Perovskaya (Russian: О́льга Васи́льевна Перо́вская; 9 April 1902 – 1961) was a Soviet children's literature writer. Her most notable work Rebyata i Zveryata (Kids and Cubs) was published in 1925. It is a series of stories about the various pets she and her sisters (Sonya, Yulia and Natasha) kept during their childhood. She was arrested on 15 March 1943 and sentenced to 10 years imprisonment in labour camps during the Great Purge. Her sentence was later modified to one of exile. During 1940–50, her books were not published. She was rehabilitated toward the end of the fifties. Rebyata i Zveryata has been translated into a number of languages including English, Malayalam and Tamil. In English, it has been published under two different titles Kids and Cubs and The Wolf in Olga's Kitchen.

== Publications ==
- Rebi︠a︡ta i zveri︠a︡ta : rasskazy, 1929
- Menschen- und Tierkinder, 1933
- Marmotka, 1939
- Tygřík Vaska, 1958
- Tigrënok vasʹka, 1959
- Kids and cubs, 1966
- The wolf in Olga's kitchen, 1969
- Storie di animali, Ed. Progress Mosca 1972
- Mały tiger Waska powědančce, 1984
- Rebi︠a︡ta i zveri︠a︡ta : povesti o zhivotnykh, 1993
