= Larisa Vaneeva =

Russian writer

Larisa L'vovna Vaneeva (Russian: Лариса Ванеева; born 1953) is a Russian writer.

== Life ==
Larisa Vaneeva was born in 1953 in Novosibirsk.

Throughout the 1980s Vaneeva found it impossible to publish, and was forced to work as a caretaker. As a woman writer Vaneeva even faced criticism for her "menstrual prose". She joined with Svetlana Vasilenko and others to form a feminist literary group, The New Amazons, who published an anthology of women's writing in Russia in 1990.

Vaneeva lives in the Pühtitsa Convent in Estonia and has not written for a long time.

== Works ==
- (ed.) Ne pomni︠a︡shchai︠a︡ zla : novai︠a︡ zhenskai︠a︡ proza. 1990.
- Iz Kuba : rasskazy, povestʹ [Out of the Cube]. Moscow, 1990.
- Igra tuchi s dozhdem. Moscow, 1991.
- Liki: rasskazy i povesti. Tallinn, 2002.
