= Lydia Berdyaev =

Russian writer (1871–1945)

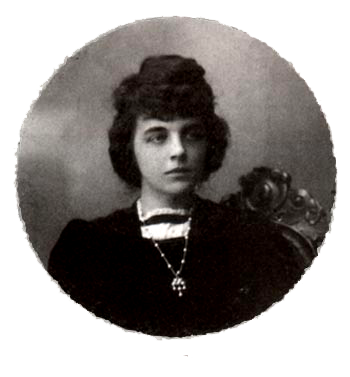
Lydia Berdyaev in 1900s

Lydia Yudifovna Berdyaev ( 20 August 1871, Kharkov, Russian Empire - September 1945, Clamart, France) was a Russian poet, member of Russian Greek Catholic Church and a philanthropist and intellectual leader among the Russian diaspora in France.

== Biography ==
She was born in Kharkov, into an Orthodox family. Her father served as a Civil law notary at the Kharkov District Court.

Her first marriage was with Baron Victor Ivanovich Rapp, an official of Kharkov Chamber of Control and coowner of the publishing house "V.I. Rapp and V. Potapov."

She was member of the Kharkov Union of the Russian Social Democratic Labour Party, for which she was arrested on 6 January 1900 and jailed for a month. After her release, she went to Paris to study at the School of Social Sciences. She divorced her first husband.

On 19 February 1904 she met her future second. husband, the philosopher Nikolai Berdyaev, in Kiev. In 1918, when he was seriously ill with pneumonia, she was reading a book about Saint Teresa of Avila, which is how she developed an interest in Catholic mysticism. Berdyaev introduced her to the priest Vladimir Abrikosov and on 7 June 1918 she was received into Catholicism of the Byzantine Rite. In 1922, Berdyaev was in exile, living first in the Weimar Republic and then in France. Berdyaev became an assistant of her husband, editing his articles and books, preparing them for publication. In addition, she was an active parishioner of Fr Alexander Evreinov's Russian Catholic chapel of the Holy Trinity, located near the Porte d'Italie in Paris, where she took the lead in many charitable and pastoral projects. She died at Clamart in 1945 from throat cancer.
