= Maria Petrovykh =

Russian poet and translator (1908–1979)

- Born: 26 March 1908; Norskii Posad village near Yaroslavl, Russian Empire
- Died: 1 June 1979 (aged 71); Moscow, Russian SFSR, Soviet Union

Maria Sergeyevna Petrovykh (Russian: Мария Сергеевна Петровых, IPA: [mɐˈrʲijə sʲɪrˈɡʲe(j)ɪvnə pʲɪtrɐˈvɨx]; 26 March [O.S. 13 March] 1908 – 1 June 1979) was a Soviet poet and translator.

== Early life ==
Petrovykh was born in Norskii Posad, a village now within the city limits of Yaroslavl, where her engineer father worked in a cotton factory; her parents were married in 1896, and she was the youngest of five children. Her sister Ekaterina "suggests that the thoughtfulness and alertness that accompanied Petrovykh throughout her life were formed during their slow childhood walks with their nanny along the Volga; her sister claims as well that Petrovykh's characteristic independence and determination to carry through her decisions appeared early in life." Her mother's brother Dmitri Aleksandrovich Smirnov (1870–1940) and her father's brother Ivan Semyonovich Petrovykh (metropolitan Joseph, 1872–1937) were both priests who fell victim to Stalinist repression. From 1922 she lived in Yaroslavl, where she taught school and attended Writers' Union meetings; her poetry began to be appreciated there.

== Career and private life ==
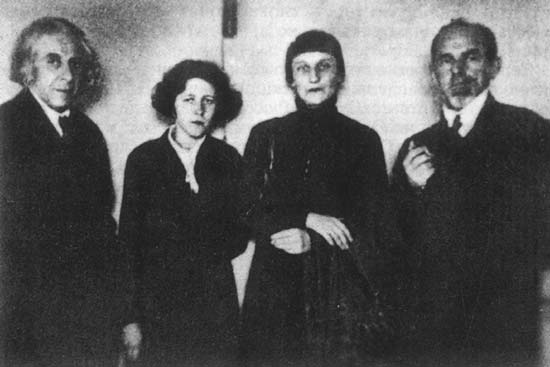
Poets of Silver Age, 1930s. Left to right:Georgy Chulkov, Mariya Petrovykh, Anna Akhmatova, Osip Mandelstam.

In 1925 she moved to Moscow, where she continued her studies at the State Higher Literary Courses (fellow students were Arseny Tarkovsky, Yuliya Neiman, Daniil Andreyev, and Yuri Dombrovsky; Tarkovsky described Petrovykh as the best poet of the group). At this time she married Petr Granditsky, but the marriage did not last long. She became a friend of both Anna Akhmatova, with whom she remained close until Akhmatova's death, and Osip Mandelstam, who fell in love with her in 1933 and dedicated to her what Akhmatova called "the best love poem of the twentieth century," "Masteritsa vinovatykh vzorov" (tr. by Richard and Elizabeth McKane as "The expert mistress of guilty glances"). In 1936 she married Vitaly Golovachev, and in 1937 their daughter Arina was born; a few months after her birth Golovachev was arrested and sentenced to five years in the Gulag (where he died in 1942). Petrovykh worked as an editor and translator for Moscow publishing houses; in the summer of 1941 she and her daughter were evacuated to Chistopol in Tatarstan, where they spent World War II. Her translations were primarily from Polish and Armenian but also from Serbo-Croatian, Bulgarian, and other languages. From 1959 to 1964 she conducted a seminar for young translators along with David Samoylov.

== Legacy ==
As a poet she was much appreciated by a small circle but little known to the wider public; the only book of poems she published during her lifetime was Dalnee derevo (A distant tree), published in Yerevan in 1968. But Akhmatova considered her "Naznach' mne svidan'e na etom svete" (Make me a date on this earth) "one of the masterpieces of twentieth-century lyric poetry." Stephanie Sandler writes:

Her obscurity seems to have been at least partially of her own making. Petrovykh's adult professional identity as editor and translator suitably allegorized the deferential, secondary position she came to prefer. ... Petrovykh did not write a great deal, but she left some exquisite love lyrics and a number of admirably precise poems of natural description. Her poems typically include some revelation of spiritual truth, and in this they are comparable to work by Anna Akhmatova, to whom Petrovykh knew she would be compared and come out the poorer.

== Death ==
Petrovykh died in 1979 and is buried in Vvedenskoye Cemetery in Moscow.
