= Alexandra Sviridova =

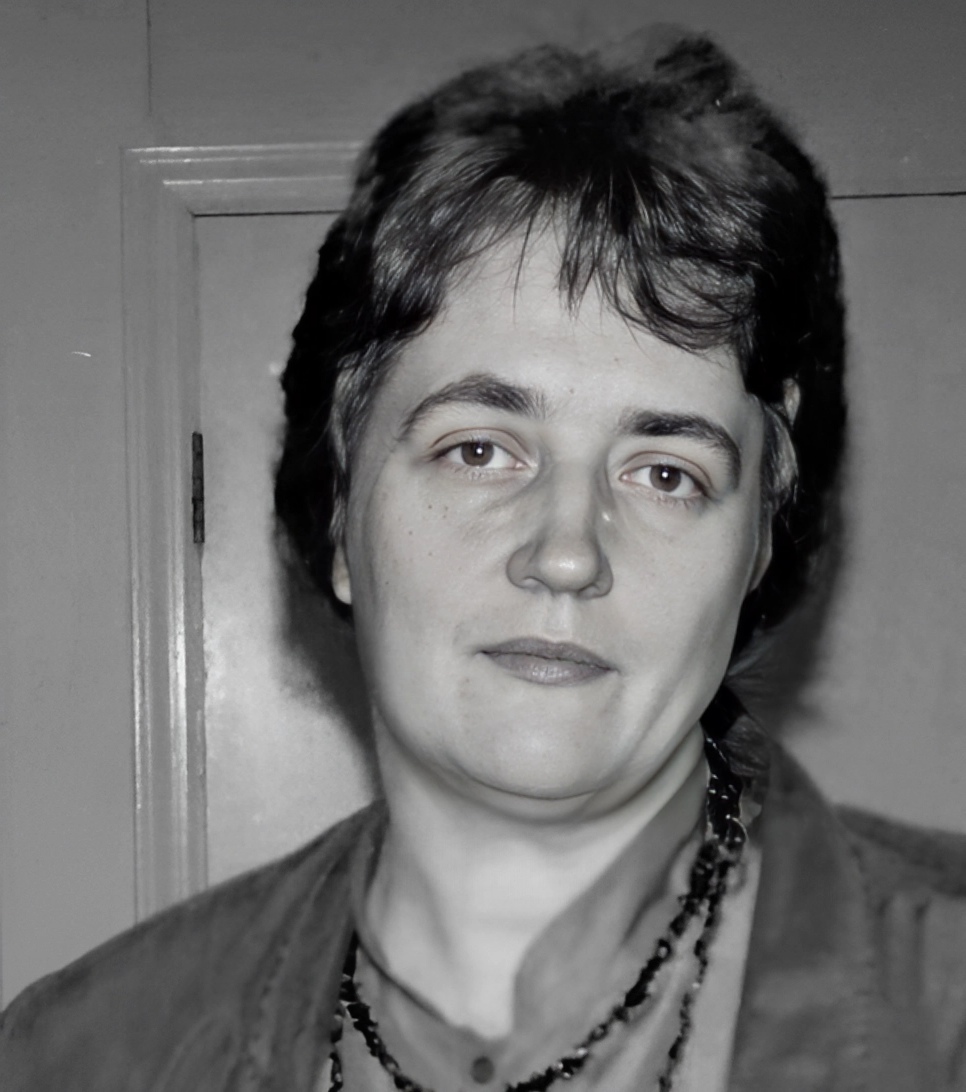
- Born: 18 August 1951; Kherson Ukraine, USSR
- Occupations: journalist, writer
- Children: Lev Sviridov, born 1982
- Writing career
- Period: since 1981
- Notable awards: Mark Aldanov award 2009

Alexandra Alexandrovna Sviridova (Russian: Александра Свиридова, alternate spellings: Alexandra Sviridov, Aleksandra Sviridov, and Aleksandra Sviridova) is a writer, journalist and filmmaker from Moscow, Russia.

== Biography ==
Alexandra Sviridova was born in the Soviet city Kherson. In 1976, having been student of Vasily Solovyov, she graduated from the Gerasimov Institute of Cinematography aka VGIK and started working as a TV screenwriter. In 1993, she immigrated from the post Soviet Russia to America, with her son Lev Sviridov (who later won a Rhodes Scholarship while a student at the City College of New York). She wrote scenarios for about 20 films and wrote over 500 essays.

Prior to leaving Russia, she wrote the scenario and co-directed (with Andrey Yerastov) the Russian language film "Varlam Shalamov. Several of My Lives" ("Варлам Шаламов. Несколько моих жизней" ) (1991) about Varlam Shalamov, an author of a collection of short stories about his experience in Gulag labor camps.

In 1986, she wrote the screenplay for a short animated film called "One Doll's Story" "История одной куклы" directed by Boris Ablymin about the Auschwitz Nazi concentration camp. It received the "Silver Dragon", major award of XXII Kraków International Film Festival. "Using stop-action animation, this inspiring film is one of the most engaging films ever made about the Holocaust" Patricia Kowal, Los Angeles View, 1996.

She also produced Twelve one-hour shows for Russian television called "Top Secret". They dealt with such topics as Boris Pasternak's personal letters and manuscripts that were held by the KGB for thirty years, the Central Committee's secret files on the 1986 Chernobyl disaster, and former KGB agents who were serving as President Yeltsin's advisers or were lodged in other high positions. Twelve documentaries were on the top of the rating charts when they were shown during the period between March 1992 and April 1993.

For several years, she worked for Survivors of the SHOAH Visual History Foundation, Founder and Chair: Steven Spielberg. She left in protest when it departed from the initially set goal: to record testimonies of all of the remaining survivors of the Holocaust (the work was stopped after collecting about 55,000 interviews, with 25,000 letters with apologies sent to people left unrecorded ).

She and other journalists claimed that while in the United States, they were not free to write truly independently. As an example she said her interviews with human rights activists, such as Yelena Bonner, were censored.

In 2019, she wrote the biography of Nicolas Iljine "BIG NIC" in 4 volumes published by LULU Press, New York.

In 2023, she was awarded the prize for best essay in the literary Journal ZVEZDA.

== Private life ==
She lives in New York. Her son is Lev Sviridov, born 1982.

== Filmography ==
- 1982 In the Sky of the Night Witches
- 1985 Miracle Tree
- 1986 One Doll's Story
- 1989 Boy and Frog
- 1991 Confession of A Kept Woman
- 1991 Varlam Shalamov. Several of My Lives

== Books ==
- 1985 My Metamorphoses
- 1987 Scroll
- 2009 Inhalation of Fish On the Mountain

== Prizes and awards ==
- 2009 Mark Aldanov award
