= Marina Gershenovich =

Russian poet and translator (born 1960)

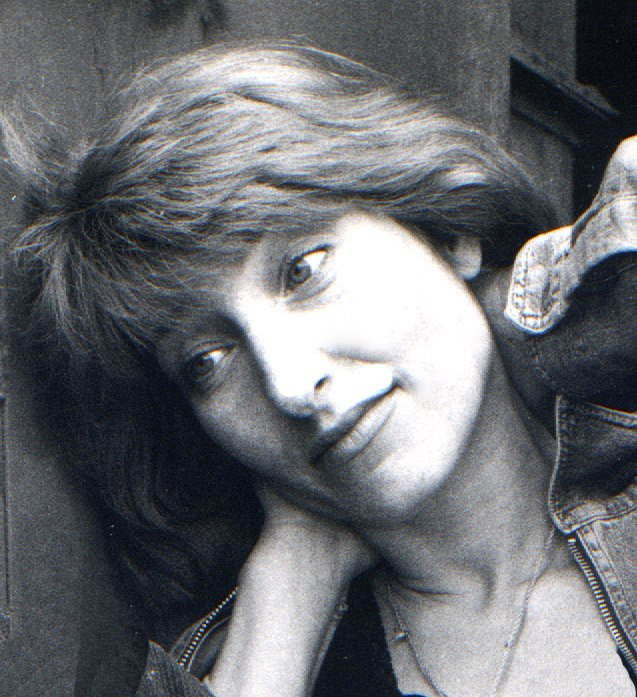
- Gershenovich in 1998
- Born: September 28, 1960 (age 65); Novosibirsk
- Children: son Anton
- Writing career
- Language: Russian
- Genres: Poetry, Poetry Translations

Marina Iosifovna Gershenovich (Russian: Мари́на Ио́сифовна Гершено́вич, IPA: [mɐˈrʲinə ɪˈosʲɪfəvnə ɡʲɪrʂɨˈnovʲɪtɕ]; born September 28, 1960) is a Russian poet and translator born in the city of Novosibirsk, Soviet Union, who resides in Düsseldorf, Germany.

== Bibliography ==
- Razgovory na rasput’e (1995)
- V poiskah angela (2002)
- Kniga na četveryh (2005)
- Mascha Kaleko: Žizn’ i stihi (2007)
