= Sergei Efron =

Russian and Soviet soldier, poet, emigre, and NKVD agent

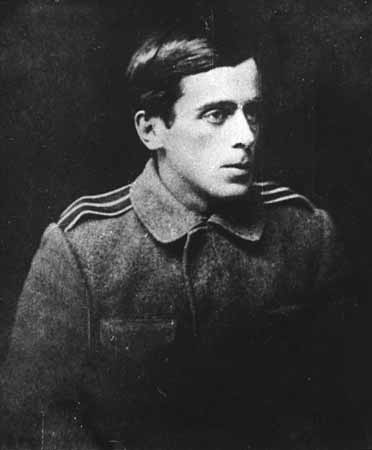
Sergei Efron

Sergei Yakovlevich Efron (Russian: Сергей Яковлевич Эфрон; 8 October 1893 – 11 October 1941) was a Russian poet, White Army officer, and the husband of fellow poet Marina Tsvetaeva. While in exile, he was recruited by the Soviet NKVD. After returning to the USSR from France, he was executed.

== Family life ==
Sergei was born in Moscow on 8 October 1893. He was the sixth of nine children born to Elizaveta Durnovo (1853–1910) and Yakov Konstantinovich Efron (1854–1909). Both were Russian revolutionaries and members of the Black Repartition. Yakov worked as an insurance agent and died of cancer in 1909. The following year, one of Sergei's brothers died by suicide and his mother soon followed suit. Yakov was from a Jewish family, while Elizaveta came from a line of Russian nobility and merchants; Yakov converted to the Lutheran faith to marry Elizaveta.

Efron contracted tuberculosis as a teenager and his mental and physical health was strained further upon learning of his mother's death. After becoming a student at Moscow University, Sergei volunteered for the military as a nurse. Due to his poor health, though, he was unable to serve in that capacity. Instead, he enrolled in the officer cadet academy.

When Efron was a 17-year-old cadet in the officers' academy, he met 19-year-old Marina Tsvetaeva on 5 May 1911 at Koktebel ("Blue Height"), a well-known Crimean haven for writers, poets and artists. They fell in love and were married in January 1912. While they had an intense relationship, Tsvetaeva had affairs, such as those with Osip Mandelstam and poet Sofia Parnok.

Tsvetaeva and her husband spent summers in the Crimea until the revolution. They had two daughters: Ariadna, or Alya, (born 1912) and Irina (born 1917), and one son, Georgy.

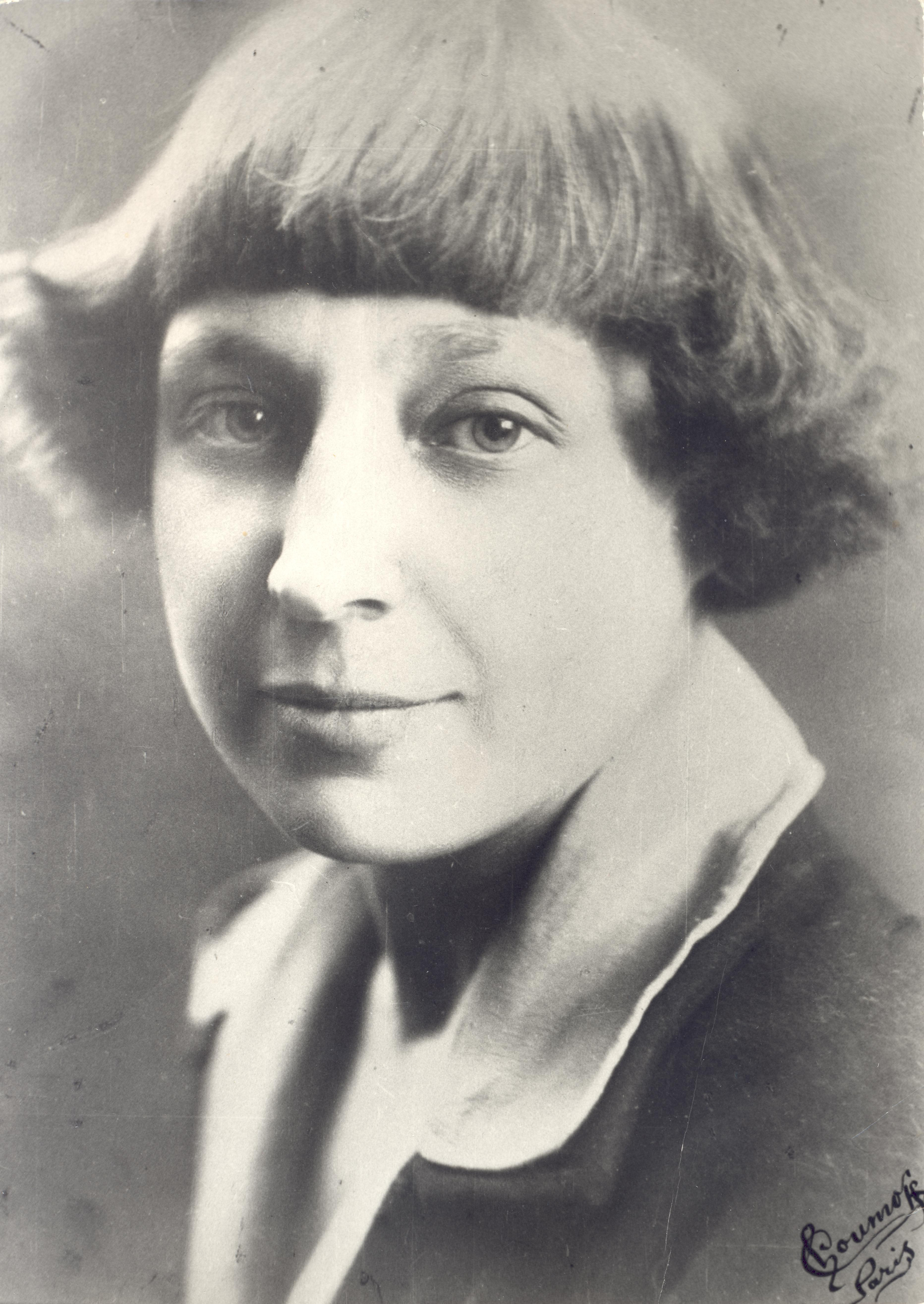
Marina Tsvetaeva, Sergei Efron's wife and poet

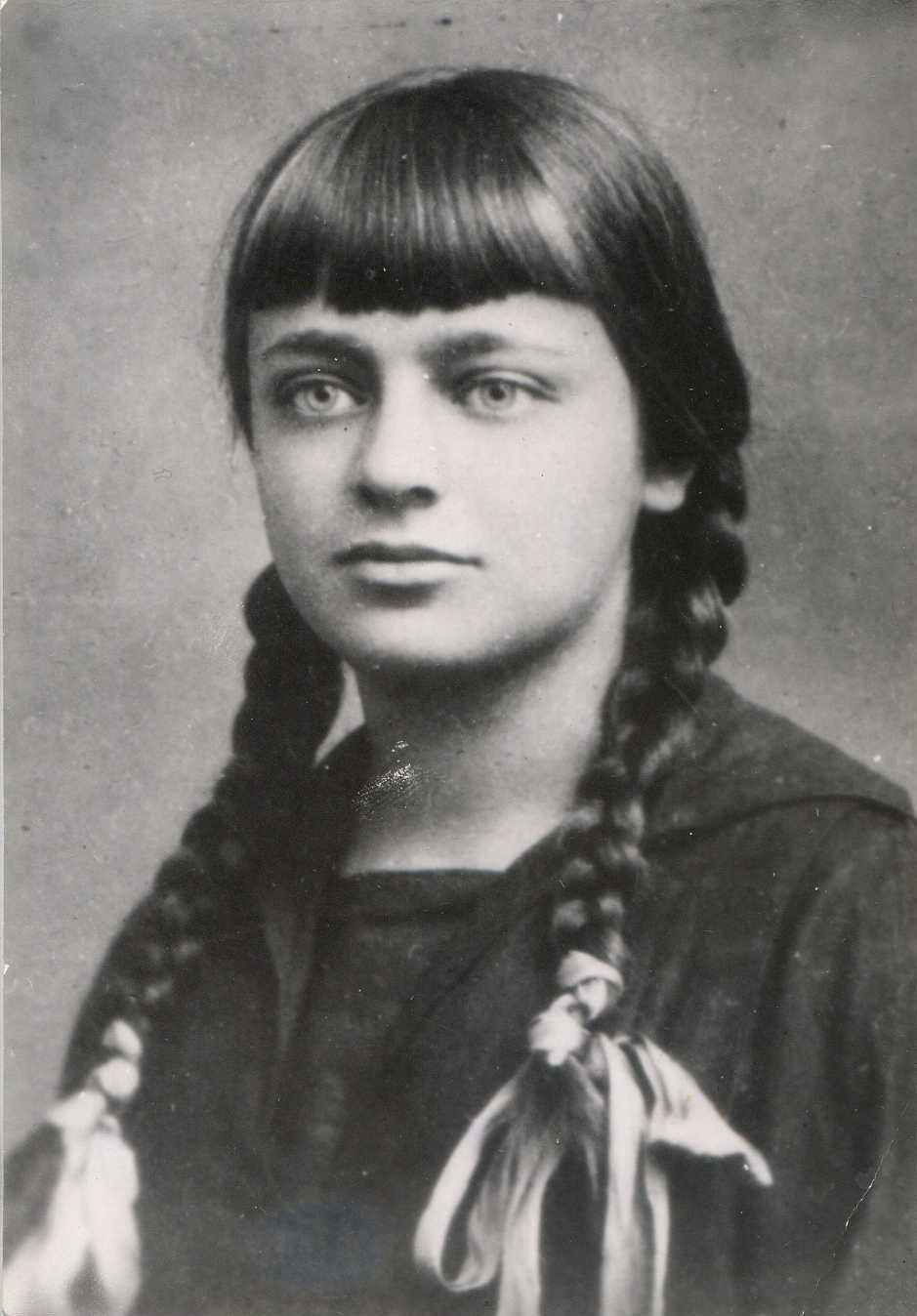
Ariadna (Alya) Efron, Sergei Efron's daughter, 1926

== Russian Revolution and civil war ==
Efron volunteered for the military in 1914 and by 1917 was an officer stationed in Moscow with the 56th Reserve. In October 1917, he participated in the fighting against the Bolsheviks in Moscow, then he joined the White Army and participated in the Ice March and defense of the Crimea, while Tsvetaeva returned from the Crimea to Moscow hoping to be reunited with her husband. During that time, though, the relationship between Efron and Tsvetaeva was strained, with little communication. Efron was disenchanted with what he felt was a revolution largely unsupported by the Russian people, the expression of which inspired Tsvetaeva's Daybreak on the Rails.

Tsvetaeva was trapped in Moscow for five years, during which there was a severe famine. The famine was to exact a toll on her, with starvation and worry eroding her looks. With no immediate family, she had no way to support herself or her daughters. In 1919, she placed them in a state orphanage, mistakenly believing that they would be better fed there. Alya became ill and Tsvetaeva removed her but Irina died there of starvation in 1920.

== Post civil war ==
At the end of the civil war, Efron emigrated to Berlin. There, in May 1922, Efron was reunited in Berlin with his wife, Tsvetaeva, and daughter Ariadna who had left the Soviet Union. In August 1922, the family moved to Prague. Living in unremitting poverty, unable to afford living accommodation in Prague itself, with Efron studying politics and sociology at the Charles University and living in hostels, Tsvetaeva and Ariadna found rooms in a village outside the city. She writes "we are devoured by coal, gas, the milkman, the baker... the only meat we eat is horse-meat".

In summer 1924, Efron and Tsvetaeva left Prague for the suburbs, living for a while in Jíloviště, before moving on to Všenory, where Tsvetaeva conceived their son, Georgy, whom she was to later nickname 'Mur'. He was a difficult child but Tsetaeva loved him obsessively. With Efron now rarely free from tuberculosis, their daughter Ariadna was relegated to the role of the mother's helper and confidante, and consequently felt robbed of much of her childhood.

In 1925, the family settled in Paris, where they would live for the next 14 years. During this time Tsvetaeva contracted tuberculosis.

While residing in Prague, Efron became associated with the Eurasianists and became one of their leaders. In 1926 he and his family moved to Paris where he edited the journal of the Eurasianists and became one of the representatives of the "left Eurasianist" trend which was openly sympathetic to the Soviet Union. In 1929, the Eurasianists were divided and their journal ceased to be published.

== NKVD agent ==
While still in Paris, Efron was homesick for Russia. He was afraid of returning because of his past as a White soldier. Eventually, either out of idealism or to garner acceptance for his repatriation from the Communists, he began spying for the NKVD, the forerunner of the KGB, and in doing so was established in a dacha, a safe house in the countryside. Alya shared his Stalinist views, and increasingly turned against her mother. In 1937, she returned to the Soviet Union. Later that year, Efron too had to return to USSR. In September 1937, an investigation by French and Swiss police implicated Efron in the murder of former NKVD spymaster and defector Ignace Reiss (also known as Ignaty Reyss and Ignatz Reiss), on a country lane near Lausanne, Switzerland.

After defecting and then criticizing Stalin and Yezhov, Soviet spy Reiss had promised not to reveal any state security secrets and fled with his wife and child to the remote village of Finhaut, Valais canton, Switzerland, to hide. After they had been hiding for a month, they were contacted by a refugee member of the Communist Party of Germany Gertrude Schildbach under orders from Roland Lyudvigovich Abbiate, alias Francois Rossi, alias Vladimir Pravdin, codename LETCHIK ("Pilot"), a Russian expatriate, citizen of Monaco, and an NKVD agent. Schildbach wrote to Reiss to request a meeting and ask his advice. On 4 September 1937, Reiss agreed to meet Schildbach in Lausanne. Reiss, who was using the alias Eberhardt, was lured by Gertrude Schildbach onto a side road near Lausanne where Roland Abbiate was waiting for him with a Soviet PPD-34 sub-machine gun. Reiss was hit by twelve bullets and killed instantly. The two then dumped Reiss's body on the side of the road. Schildbach was never seen again.

Efron was allegedly in the car with the two assassins. He was also alleged to be an NKVD spymaster and to be running a "Union for Repatriation" office as a cover for recruiting NKVD operatives from within the Russian community in Paris. A police search of both the office and Efron's flat, however, yielded no evidence.

After Efron fled Paris, the police interrogated Tsvetaeva at the Paris Surete Nationale headquarters on 22 October 1937. She was confused by their questions, answered incoherently, but is quoted as saying that in September he had been fighting in Spain and that "His trust might have been abused—my trust in him remains unchanged." The French police concluded that she was deranged and knew nothing of the murder. In fact, Efron had returned to Moscow under NKVD orders and was held under house arrest in a dacha until he was arrested on 10 December 1937.

Tsvetaeva may not even have known that her husband was a Soviet spy, or the extent to which he was compromised.

== Return to the Soviet Union ==
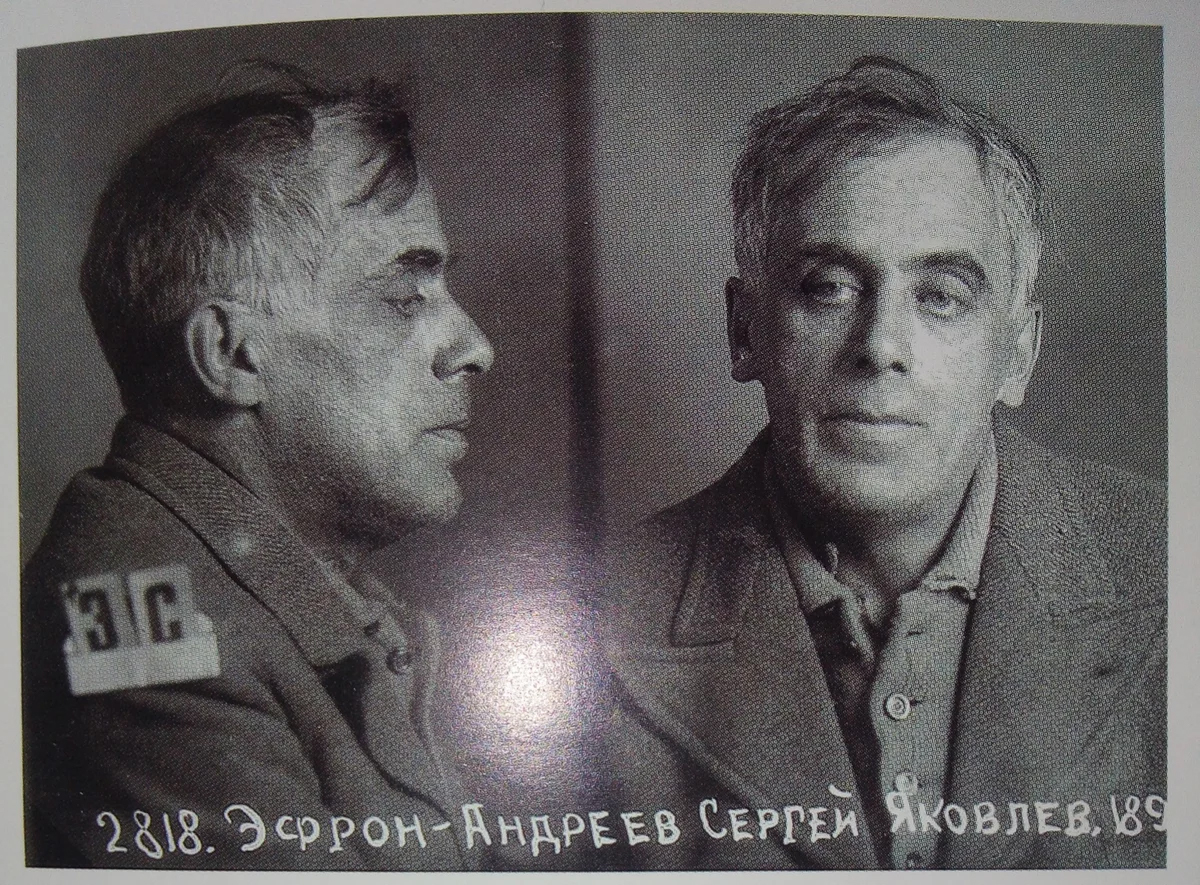
Photo of Efron after his arrest by the NKVD, 1939

In 1939, Tsvetaeva and son Georgy returned to Moscow, unaware of the reception she would receive.

Efron and Alya were arrested for espionage. Alya's fiancé was actually an NKVD agent who had been assigned to spy on the family. Under torture Efron was pressed to give evidence against Tsvetaeva, but he refused to testify against her or anyone else. His daughter, however, confessed under beatings that her father was a Trotskyite spy, which led to his execution. Efron was shot in 1941 in the Medvedev Forest massacre; Alya served over eight years in prison. Both were exonerated after Stalin's death.

In 1941, Tsvetaeva and her son were evacuated to Yelabuga. On 31 August 1941, while living in Yelabuga (Elabuga), Tsvetaeva hanged herself.
