= Novoseltsev =

Novoseltsev (Russian: Новосельцев) is a Russian masculine surname, its feminine counterpart is Novoseltseva. It may refer to

- Anatoly Novoseltsev (1933–1995), Russian orientalist
- Ivan Novoseltsev (born 1979), Russian ice hockey player
- Ivan Yevgenyevich Novoseltsev (born 1991), Russian football player
- Larisa Novoseltseva, Russian singer-songwriter and composer
- Ruslan Novoseltsev (born 1974), Russian figure skater
- Yuri Novoseltsev (born 1964), Russian football player
