= Zlata =

- Gender: Female

Origin
- Origin: Slavic
- Meaning: zlato (gold or golden)

Other names
- Variant form: Zlatan (m)

Zlata (Cyrillic: Злата) is a female given name of South Slavic origin meaning "golden". It is common amongst all South Slavic countries in the Balkans, such as Bosnia and Herzegovina, Bulgaria, Croatia, North Macedonia and Serbia. The name is popular in Bosnia because it is considered ethnically neutral amongst the three dominant Bosnian ethnicities: Bosniaks, Serbs and Croats. The name is derived from the South Slavic word zlato - from the Old Slavic root zolto (gold).

Notable people with the name include:

- Zlata Adamovská (born 1959), Czech actress
- Zlata Arkatova (born 2010), Kyrgyzstani rhythmic gymnast
- Zlata Bartl (1920–2008), Bosnian scientist
- Zlata Bizova (1927–2013), Russian painter
- Zlata Filipović (born 1980), Bosnian writer
- Zlata Kolarić-Kišur (1894–1990), Croatian writer
- Zlata of Meglen (died 1795), Bulgarian saint
- Zlata Ognevich (born 1986), Ukrainian singer and politician
- Zlata Petković (1954–2012), Serbian actress
- Zlata Petrović (born 1962), Serbian singer
- Zlata Razdolina (born 1959), Russian musician

== See also ==
- Slavic names
