= Marina Tsvetaeva =

Russian poet (1892–1941)

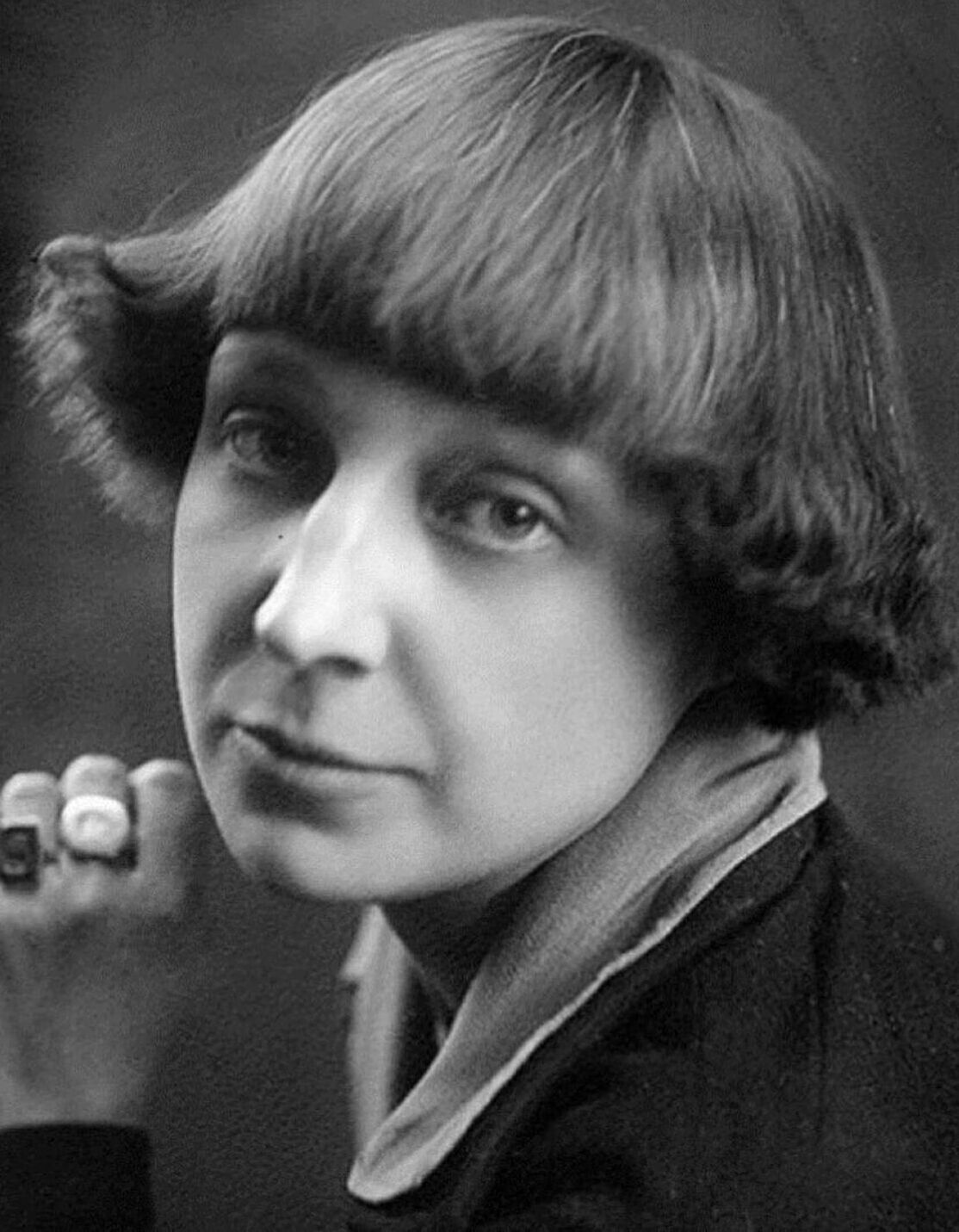
- Tsvetaeva in 1925
- Born: Marina Ivanovna Tsvetaeva; 8 October 1892; Moscow, Russian Empire
- Died: 31 August 1941 (aged 48); Yelabuga, Russian SFSR, Soviet Union
- Education: Sorbonne, Paris
- Occupations: Poet and writer
- Spouse: Sergei Efron (m. 1912)
- Children: 3, including Ariadna Efron
- Writing career
- Movement: Russian symbolism

Marina Ivanovna Tsvetaeva (Russian: Марина Ивановна Цветаева, IPA: [mɐˈrʲinə ɪˈvanəvnə tsvʲɪˈta(j)ɪvə]; 8 October [O.S. 26 September] 1892 – 31 August 1941) was a Russian poet. Her work is some of the best known in twentieth-century Russian literature. She lived through and wrote about the Russian Revolution of 1917 and the subsequent Moscow famine.

Marina attempted to save her daughter Irina from starvation by placing her in a state orphanage in 1919, where Irina died of hunger. Tsvetaeva left Russia in 1922 and lived with her family in increasing poverty in Paris, Berlin and Prague before returning to Moscow in 1939. Her husband Sergei Efron and their daughter Ariadna (Alya) were arrested on espionage charges in 1941, when her husband was executed.

Tsvetaeva hanged herself in 1941. A lyrical poet of passion and daring linguistic experimentation, she chronicled her times and the depths of the human condition.

== Early years ==
Marina Tsvetaeva was born in Moscow, the daughter of Ivan Vladimirovich Tsvetaev, a professor of Fine Art at the University of Moscow, who later founded the Alexander III Museum of Fine Arts (known from 1937 as the Pushkin Museum). Tsvetaeva's mother, Maria Alexandrovna Mein, Ivan's second wife, was a concert pianist, highly literate, with German and Polish ancestry. Growing up in considerable material comfort, Tsvetaeva later came to identify herself with the Polish aristocracy.

Tsvetaeva's two half-siblings, Valeria and Andrei, were the children of Ivan's deceased first wife, Varvara Dmitrievna Ilovaiskaya, daughter of the historian Dmitry Ilovaisky. Tsvetaeva's only full sister, Anastasia, was born in 1894. The children quarrelled frequently and occasionally violently. There was considerable tension between Tsvetaeva's mother and Varvara's children, and Tsvetaeva's father maintained close contact with Varvara's family. Tsvetaeva's father was kind, but deeply wrapped up in his studies and distant from his family. He was also still deeply in love with his first wife; he would never get over her. Likewise, Tsvetaeva's mother Maria had never recovered from a love affair she had had before her marriage. Maria disapproved of Marina's poetic inclination; holding the opinion that Marina's poetry was poor, Maria wanted her daughter to become a pianist.

In 1902, Maria contracted tuberculosis. A change in climate was recommended to help cure the disease, and so the family travelled abroad until shortly before her death in 1906, when Tsvetaeva was 14. They lived for a while by the sea at Nervi, near Genoa. There, away from the rigid constraints of a bourgeois Muscovite life, Tsvetaeva was able for the first time to run free, climb cliffs, and vent her imagination in childhood games. There were many Russian émigré revolutionaries residing at that time in Nervi, who may have had some influence on the young Tsvetaeva.

In June 1904, Tsvetaeva was sent to school in Lausanne. Changes in the Tsvetaev residence led to several changes in school, and during the course of her travels she acquired the Italian, French, and German languages. She gave up the strict musical studies that her mother had imposed and turned to poetry. She wrote "With a mother like her, I had only one choice: to become a poet".

In 1908, aged 16, Tsvetaeva studied literary history at the Sorbonne. During this time, a major revolutionary change was occurring within Russian poetry: the flowering of the Russian symbolist movement, and this movement was to colour most of her later work. It was not the theory that attracted her, but the poetry and the gravity that writers such as Andrei Bely and Alexander Blok were capable of generating. Her own first collection of poems, Vecherny Albom (Evening Album), self-published in 1910, promoted her considerable reputation as a poet. It was well received, although her early poetry was held to be insipid compared to her later work. It attracted the attention of the poet and critic Maximilian Voloshin, whom Tsvetaeva described after his death in A Living Word About a Living Man. Voloshin came to see Tsvetaeva and soon became her friend and mentor.

== Family and career ==
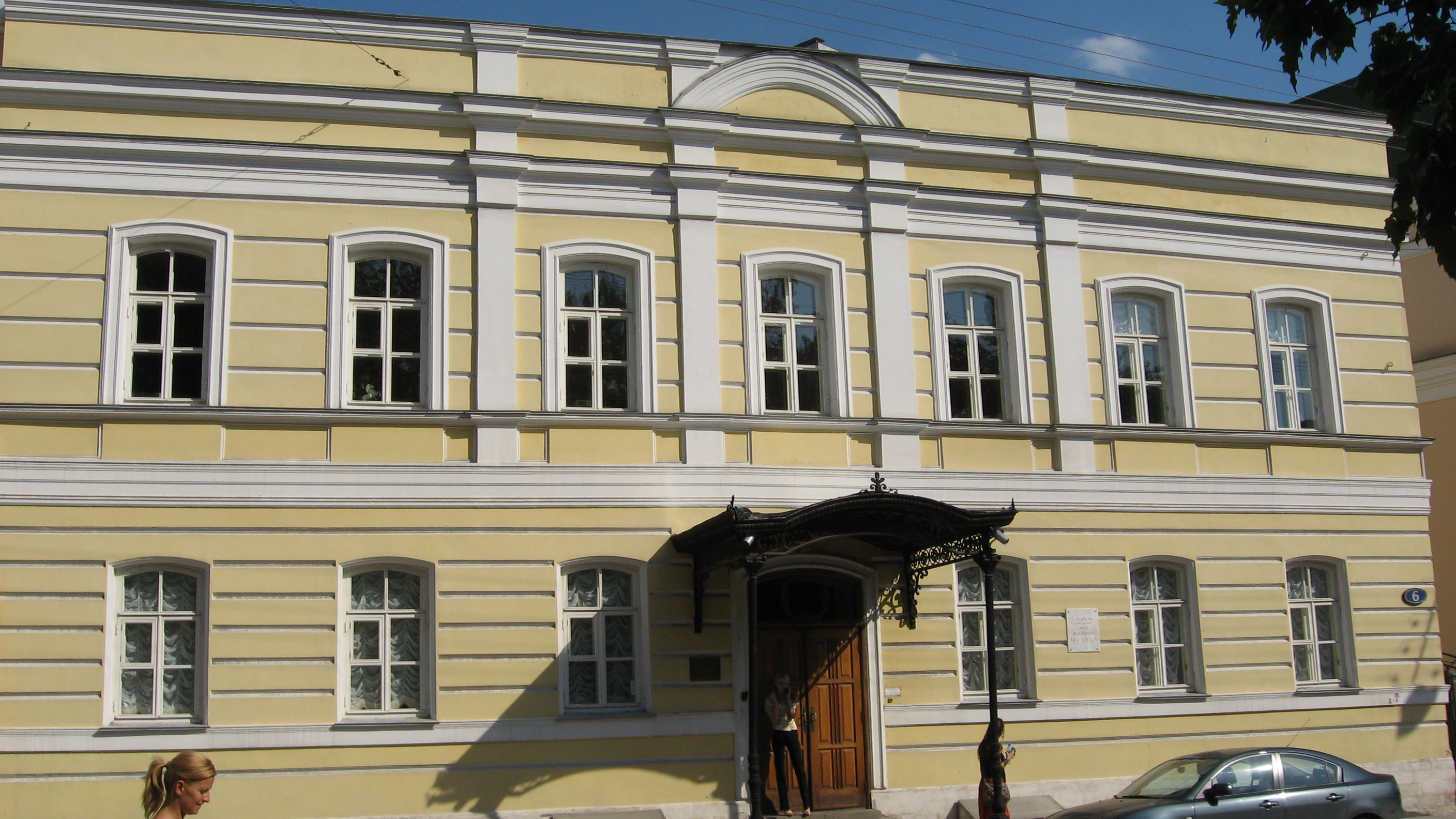
The house where Marina lived in Moscow

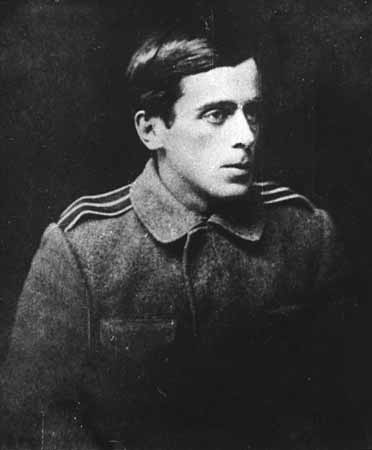
Tsvetaeva's husband Sergei Efron

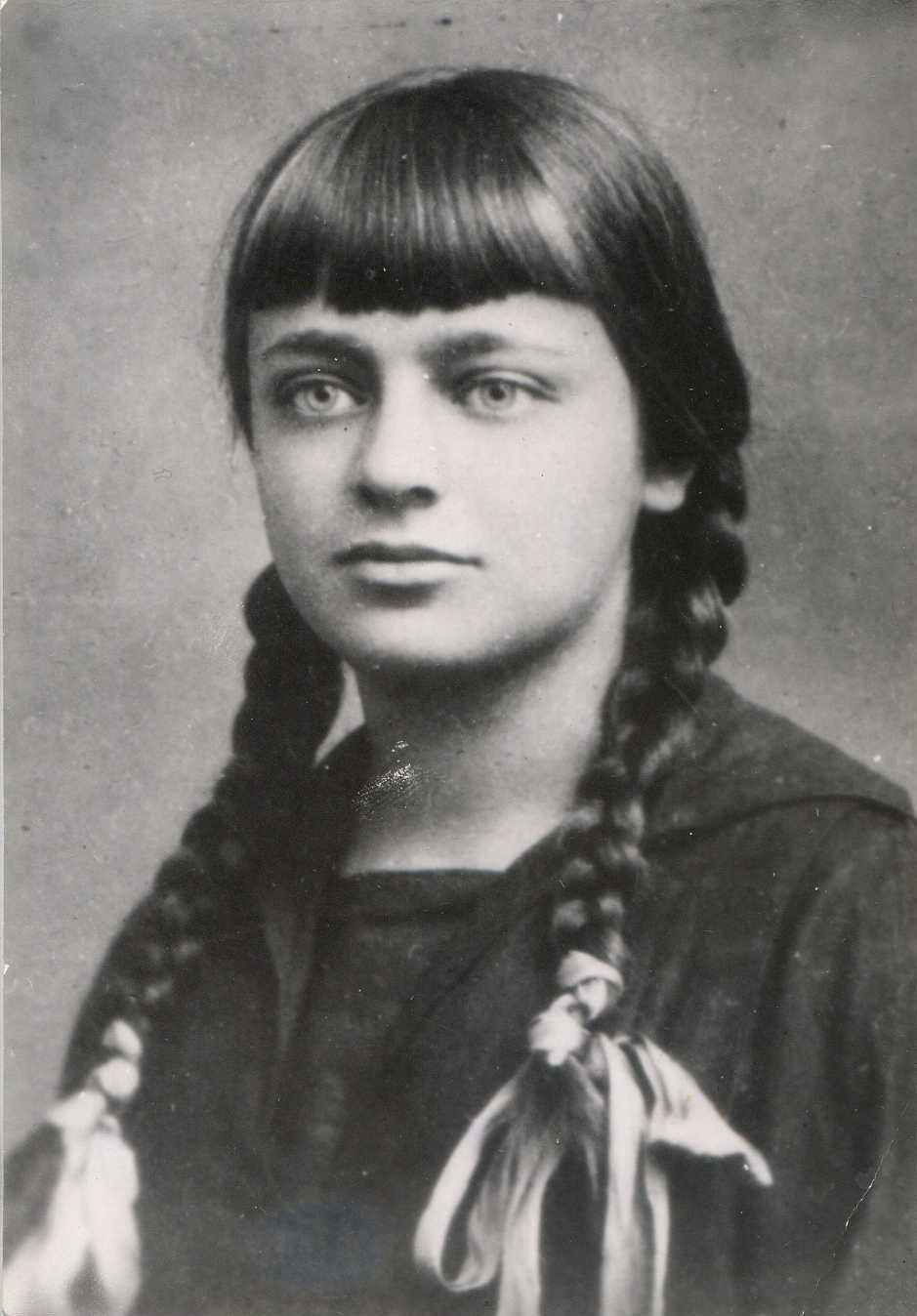
Ariadna (Alya) Efron, 1926

Tsvetaeva began spending time at Voloshin's home in the Black Sea resort of Koktebel, which was a well-known haven for writers, poets and artists. She became enamoured of the work of Alexander Blok and Anna Akhmatova, although she never met Blok and did not meet Akhmatova until the 1940s. Describing the Koktebel community, the émigré Viktoria Schweitzer wrote: "Here inspiration was born." At Koktebel, Tsvetaeva met Sergei Yakovlevich Efron, a cadet in the Officers' Academy. She was 19, he 18; they fell in love and were married in 1912, the same year as her father's project, the Alexander III Museum of Fine Arts, was ceremonially opened, an event attended by Tsar Nicholas II. Tsvetaeva's love for Efron was intense, but this did not preclude her from having affairs, including one with Osip Mandelstam, which she celebrated in a collection of poems called Mileposts. At around the same time, she became involved in an affair with the poet Sophia Parnok, who was 7 years older than Tsvetaeva, an affair that caused her husband great grief. The two women fell deeply in love, and the relationship profoundly affected both women's writings. She deals with the ambiguous and tempestuous nature of this relationship in a cycle of poems which at times she called The Girlfriend, and at other times The Mistake. Tsvetaeva and her husband spent summers in the Crimea until the revolution, and had two daughters: Ariadna, or Alya (born 1912), and Irina (born 1917).

In 1914, Efron volunteered for the front and by 1917 he was an officer stationed in Moscow with the 56th Reserve.

Tsvetaeva was a close witness of the Russian Revolution, which she rejected. On trains, she came into contact with ordinary Russian people and was shocked by the mood of anger and violence. She wrote in her journal: "In the air of the compartment hung only three axe-like words: bourgeois, Junkers, leeches." After the 1917 Revolution, Efron joined the White Army, and Marina returned to Moscow hoping to be reunited with her husband. She was trapped in Moscow for five years, where there was a terrible famine.

She wrote six plays in verse and narrative poems. Between 1917 and 1922 she wrote the epic verse cycle Lebedinyi stan (The Encampment of the Swans) about the civil war, glorifying those who fought against the communists. The cycle of poems in the style of a diary or journal begins on the day of Tsar Nicholas II's abdication in March 1917, and ends late in 1920, when the anti-communist White Army was finally defeated. The 'swans' of the title refer to the volunteers in the White Army, in which her husband was fighting as an officer.

The Moscow famine exacted a toll on Tsvetaeva. With no immediate family to turn to, she had no way to support herself or her daughters. In 1919, she placed both her daughters in a state orphanage, mistakenly believing that they would be better fed there. Alya became ill, and Tsvetaeva removed her, but Irina died there of starvation in 1920. The child's death caused Tsvetaeva great grief and regret. In one letter, she wrote, "God punished me."

During these years, Tsvetaeva maintained a close and intense friendship with the actress Sofia Evgenievna Holliday, for whom she wrote a number of plays. Many years later, she would write the novella Povest o Sonechke (Story about Sonechka) about her relationship with Holliday.

== Exile ==
=== Berlin and Prague ===
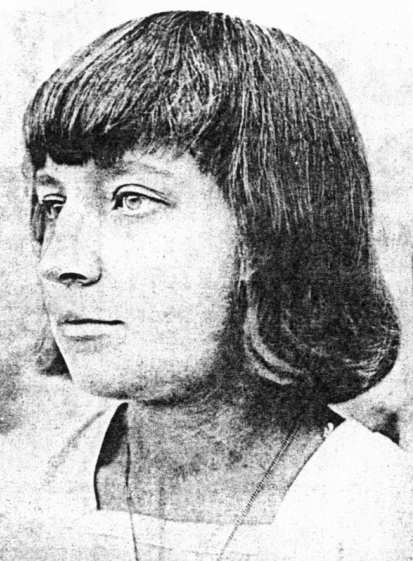
Marina Tsvetaeva (1913)

In May 1922, Tsvetaeva and Ariadna left Soviet Russia and were reunited in Berlin with Efron, who she had thought had been killed by the Bolsheviks. There she published the collections Separation, Poems to Blok, and the poem The Tsar Maiden. Much of her poetry was published in Moscow and Berlin, consolidating her reputation. In August 1922, the family moved to Prague. Living in unremitting poverty, unable to afford living accommodation in Prague itself, with Efron studying politics and sociology at the Charles University and living in hostels, Tsvetaeva and Ariadna found rooms in a village outside the city. She wrote: "We are devoured by coal, gas, the milkman, the baker... the only meat we eat is horsemeat." When offered an opportunity to earn money by reading her poetry, she had to beg a simple dress from a friend to replace the one she had been living in.

Tsvetaeva began a passionate affair with Konstantyn Rodziewicz, a former military officer, a liaison which became widely known throughout émigré circles. Efron was devastated. Her break-up with Rodziewicz in 1923 was almost certainly the inspiration for her The Poem of the End and "The Poem of the Mountain". At about the same time, Tsvetaeva began correspondence with poet Rainer Maria Rilke and novelist Boris Pasternak. Tsvetaeva and Pasternak were not to meet for nearly twenty years, but maintained friendship until Tsvetaeva's return to Russia.

In summer 1924, Efron and Tsvetaeva left Prague for the suburbs, living for a while in Jíloviště, before moving on to Všenory, where Tsvetaeva completed "The Poem of the End", and was to conceive their son, Georgy, whom she was to later nickname 'Mur'. Tsvetaeva wanted to name him Boris (after Pasternak); Efron insisted on Georgy. He was to be a most difficult child but Tsvetaeva loved him obsessively. With Efron now rarely free from tuberculosis, their daughter Ariadna was relegated to the role of mother's helper and confidante, and consequently felt robbed of much of her childhood. In Berlin, before settling in Paris, Tsvetaeva wrote some of her greatest verse, including Remeslo ("Craft", 1923) and Posle Rossii ("After Russia", 1928). Reflecting a life in poverty and exile, the work holds great nostalgia for Russia and its folk history, while experimenting with verse forms.

=== Paris ===
I Know the Truth

I know the truth—give up all other truths!
No need for people anywhere on earth to struggle.
Look—it is evening, look, it is nearly night:
what do you speak of, poets, lovers, generals?

The wind is level now, the earth is wet with dew,
the storm of stars in the sky will turn to quiet.
And soon all of us will sleep under the earth, we
who never let each other sleep above it.

— "I know the truth" Tsvetaeva (1915).
Trans. by Elaine Feinstein

In 1925, the family settled in Paris, where they would live for the next 14 years. At about this time Tsvetaeva had a relapse of the tuberculosis she had previously contracted in 1902. She received a small stipend from the Czechoslovak government, which gave financial support to artists and writers who had lived in Czechoslovakia. In addition, she tried to make whatever she could from readings and sales of her work. She turned more and more to writing prose because she found it made more money than poetry. Tsvetaeva did not feel at all at home in Paris's predominantly ex-bourgeois circle of Russian émigré writers. Although she had written passionately pro-'White' poems during the Revolution, her fellow émigrés thought that she was insufficiently anti-Soviet, and that her criticism of the Soviet régime was altogether too nebulous. She was particularly criticised for writing an admiring letter to the Soviet poet Vladimir Mayakovsky. In the wake of this letter, the émigré paper Posledniye Novosti, to which Tsvetaeva had been a frequent contributor, refused point-blank to publish any more of her work. She found solace in her correspondence with other writers, including Boris Pasternak, Rainer Maria Rilke, the Czech poet Anna Tesková, the critics D. S. Mirsky and Aleksandr Bakhrakh, and the Georgian émigré princess Salomea Andronikova, who became her main source of financial support. Her poetry and critical prose of the time, including her autobiographical prose works of 1934–7, is of lasting literary importance. But she felt "consumed by the daily round", resenting the domesticity that left her no time for solitude or writing. Moreover her émigré milieu regarded Tsvetaeva as a crude sort who ignored social graces. Describing her misery, she wrote to Tesková: "In Paris, with rare personal exceptions, everyone hates me, they write all sorts of nasty things, leave me out in all sorts of nasty ways, and so on". To Pasternak she complained "They don't like poetry and what am I apart from that, not poetry but that from which it is made. [I am] an inhospitable hostess. A young woman in an old dress." She began to look back at even the Prague times with nostalgia and resent her exiled state more deeply.

Meanwhile, Tsvetaeva's husband Efron was developing Soviet sympathies and was homesick for Russia. Eventually, he began working for the NKVD, the forerunner of the KGB. Their daughter Alya shared his views, and increasingly turned against her mother. In 1937, she returned to the Soviet Union. Later that year, Efron too had to return to the USSR. The French police had implicated him in the murder of the former Soviet defector Ignace Reiss in September 1937, on a country lane near Lausanne, Switzerland. After Efron's escape, the police interrogated Tsvetaeva, but she seemed confused by their questions and ended up reading them some French translations of her poetry. The police concluded that she was deranged and knew nothing of the murder. Later it was learned that Efron possibly had also taken part in the assassination of Trotsky's son in 1936. Tsvetaeva does not seem to have known that her husband was a spy, nor the extent to which he was compromised. However, she was held responsible for his actions and was ostracised in Paris because of the implication that he was involved with the NKVD. World War II had made Europe as unsafe and hostile as the USSR. In 1939, Tsvetaeva became lonely and alarmed by the rise of fascism, which she attacked in Stikhi k Chekhii ("Verses to Czechia" 1938–39).

== Last years: return to the Soviet Union ==
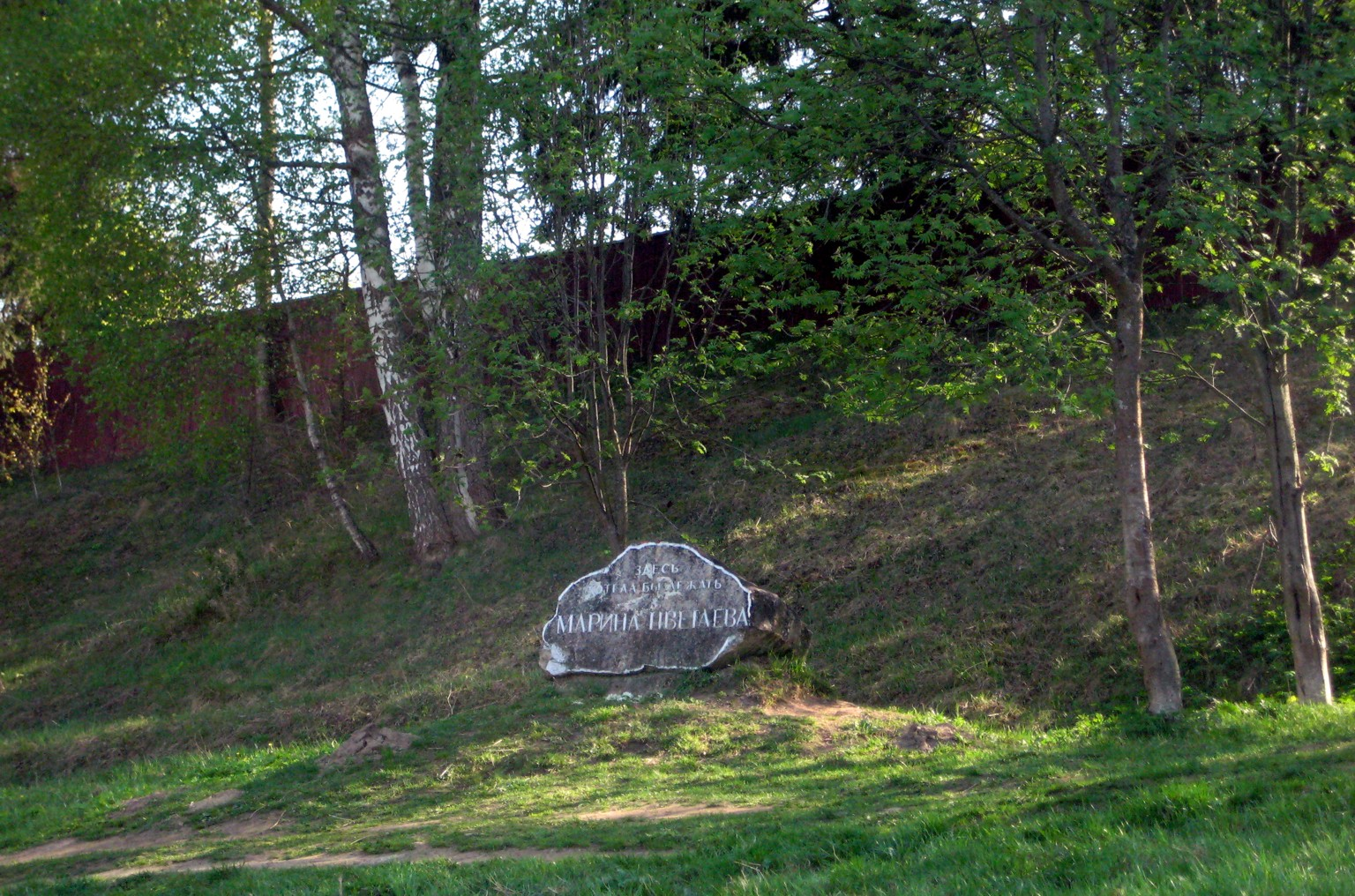
Сenotaph to Tsvetaeva

In 1939, she and her son returned to Moscow, unaware of the reception she would receive. In Stalin's USSR, anyone who had lived abroad was suspect, as was anyone who had been among the intelligentsia before the Revolution. Tsvetaeva's sister had been arrested before Tsvetaeva's return; although Anastasia survived the Stalin years, the sisters never saw each other again. Tsvetaeva found that all doors had closed to her. She got bits of work translating poetry, but otherwise the established Soviet writers refused to help her, and chose to ignore her plight; Nikolai Aseev, who she had hoped would assist, shied away, fearful for his life and position.

Efron and Alya were arrested on espionage charges in 1941; Efron was sentenced to death. Alya's fiancé was actually an NKVD agent who had been assigned to spy on the family. Efron was shot in September 1941; Alya served over eight years in prison. Both were exonerated after Stalin's death. In 1941, Tsvetaeva and her son were evacuated to Yelabuga (Elabuga), while most families of the Union of Soviet Writers were evacuated to Chistopol. Tsvetaeva had no means of support in Yelabuga, and on 24 August 1941 she left for Chistopol desperately seeking a job. On 26 August, Marina Tsvetaeva and poet Valentin Parnakh applied to the Soviet of Literature Fund asking for a job at the LitFund's canteen. Parnakh was accepted as a doorman, while Tsvetaeva's application for a permission to live in Chistopol was turned down and she had to return to Yelabuga on 28 August.

On 31 August 1941, Tsvetaeva hanged herself in Yelabuga. She left a note for her son Georgy ("Mur"): "Forgive me, but to go on would be worse. I am gravely ill, this is not me anymore. I love you passionately. Do understand that I could not live anymore. Tell Papa and Alya, if you ever see them, that I loved them to the last moment and explain to them that I found myself in a trap."

According to the book The Death of a Poet: The Last Days of Marina Tsvetaeva, the local NKVD department tried to force Tsvetaeva to start working as their informant, which left her no choice other than to kill herself.

Tsvetaeva was buried in Yelabuga cemetery on 2 September 1941, but the exact location of her grave remains unknown.

Her son Georgy volunteered for the Eastern Front of World War II and died in battle in 1944. Her daughter Ariadna spent 16 years in Soviet prison camps and exile and was released in 1955. Ariadna wrote a memoir of her family; an English-language edition was published in 2009. She died in 1975.

== Work ==
Amidst the dust of bookshops, wide dispersed
And never purchased there by anyone,
Yet similar to precious wines, my verse
Can wait – its time will come.

— Tsvetaeva (1913).
Trans. Vladimir Nabokov, 1972

Tsvetaeva's poetry was admired by poets such as Valery Bryusov, Maximilian Voloshin, Osip Mandelstam, Boris Pasternak, Rainer Maria Rilke, and Anna Akhmatova. Later, that recognition was also expressed by the poet Joseph Brodsky, pre-eminent among Tsvetaeva's champions. Tsvetaeva was primarily a lyrical poet, and her lyrical voice remains clearly audible in her narrative poetry. Brodsky said of her work: "Represented on a graph, Tsvetaeva's work would exhibit a curve – or rather, a straight line – rising at almost a right angle because of her constant effort to raise the pitch a note higher, an idea higher (or, more precisely, an octave and a faith higher.) She always carried everything she has to say to its conceivable and expressible end. In both her poetry and her prose, nothing remains hanging or leaves a feeling of ambivalence. Tsvetaeva is the unique case in which the paramount spiritual experience of an epoch (for us, the sense of ambivalence, of contradictoriness in the nature of human existence) served not as the object of expression but as its means, by which it was transformed into the material of art." Critic Annie Finch describes the engaging, heart-felt nature of the work. "Tsvetaeva is such a warm poet, so unbridled in her passion, so completely vulnerable in her love poetry, whether to her female lover Sofie Parnak, to Boris Pasternak. [...] Tsvetaeva throws her poetic brilliance on the altar of her heart’s experience with the faith of a true romantic, a priestess of lived emotion. And she stayed true to that faith to the tragic end of her life.

Tsvetaeva's lyric poems fill ten collections; the uncollected lyrics would add at least another volume. Her first two collections indicate their subject matter in their titles: Evening Album (Vecherniy albom, 1910) and The Magic Lantern (Volshebnyi fonar, 1912). The poems are vignettes of a tranquil childhood and youth in a professorial, middle-class home in Moscow, and display considerable grasp of the formal elements of style. The full range of Tsvetaeva's talent developed quickly, and was undoubtedly influenced by the contacts she had made at Koktebel, and was made evident in two new collections: Mileposts (Versty, 1921) and Mileposts: Book One (Versty, Vypusk I, 1922).

Three elements of Tsvetaeva's mature style emerge in the Mileposts collections. First, Tsvetaeva dates her poems and publishes them chronologically. The poems in Mileposts: Book One, for example, were written in 1916 and resolve themselves as a versified journal. Secondly, there are cycles of poems which fall into a regular chronological sequence among the single poems, evidence that certain themes demanded further expression and development. One cycle announces the theme of Mileposts: Book One as a whole: the "Poems of Moscow." Two other cycles are dedicated to poets, the "Poems to Akhmatova" and the "Poems to Blok", which again reappear in a separate volume, Poems to Blok (Stikhi k Bloku, 1922). Thirdly, the Mileposts collections demonstrate the dramatic quality of Tsvetaeva's work, and her ability to assume the guise of multiple dramatis personae within them.

The collection Separation (Razluka, 1922) was to contain Tsvetaeva's first long verse narrative, "On a Red Steed" ("Na krasnom kone"). The poem is a prologue to three more verse-narratives written between 1920 and 1922. All four narrative poems draw on folkloric plots. Tsvetaeva acknowledges her sources in the titles of the very long works, The Maiden Tsar: A Fairy-tale Poem (Tsar-devitsa: Poema-skazka, 1922) and "The Swain", subtitled "A Fairytale" ("Molodets: skazka", 1924). The fourth folklore-style poem is "Byways" ("Pereulochki", published in 1923 in the collection Remeslo), and it is the first poem which may be deemed incomprehensible in that it is fundamentally a soundscape of language. The collection Psyche (Psikheya, 1923) contains one of Tsvetaeva's best-known cycles "Insomnia" (Bessonnitsa) and the poem The Swans' Encampment (Lebedinyi stan, Stikhi 1917–1921, published in 1957) which celebrates the White Army.

=== Emigrant ===
Subsequently, as an émigré, Tsvetaeva's last two collections of lyrics were published by émigré presses, Craft (Remeslo, 1923) in Berlin and After Russia (Posle Rossii, 1928) in Paris. There then followed the twenty-three lyrical "Berlin" poems, the pantheistic "Trees" ("Derev'ya"), "Wires" ("Provoda") and "Pairs" ("Dvoe"), and the tragic "Poets" ("Poety"). "After Russia" contains the poem "In Praise of the Rich", in which Tsvetaeva's oppositional tone is merged with her proclivity for ruthless satire.

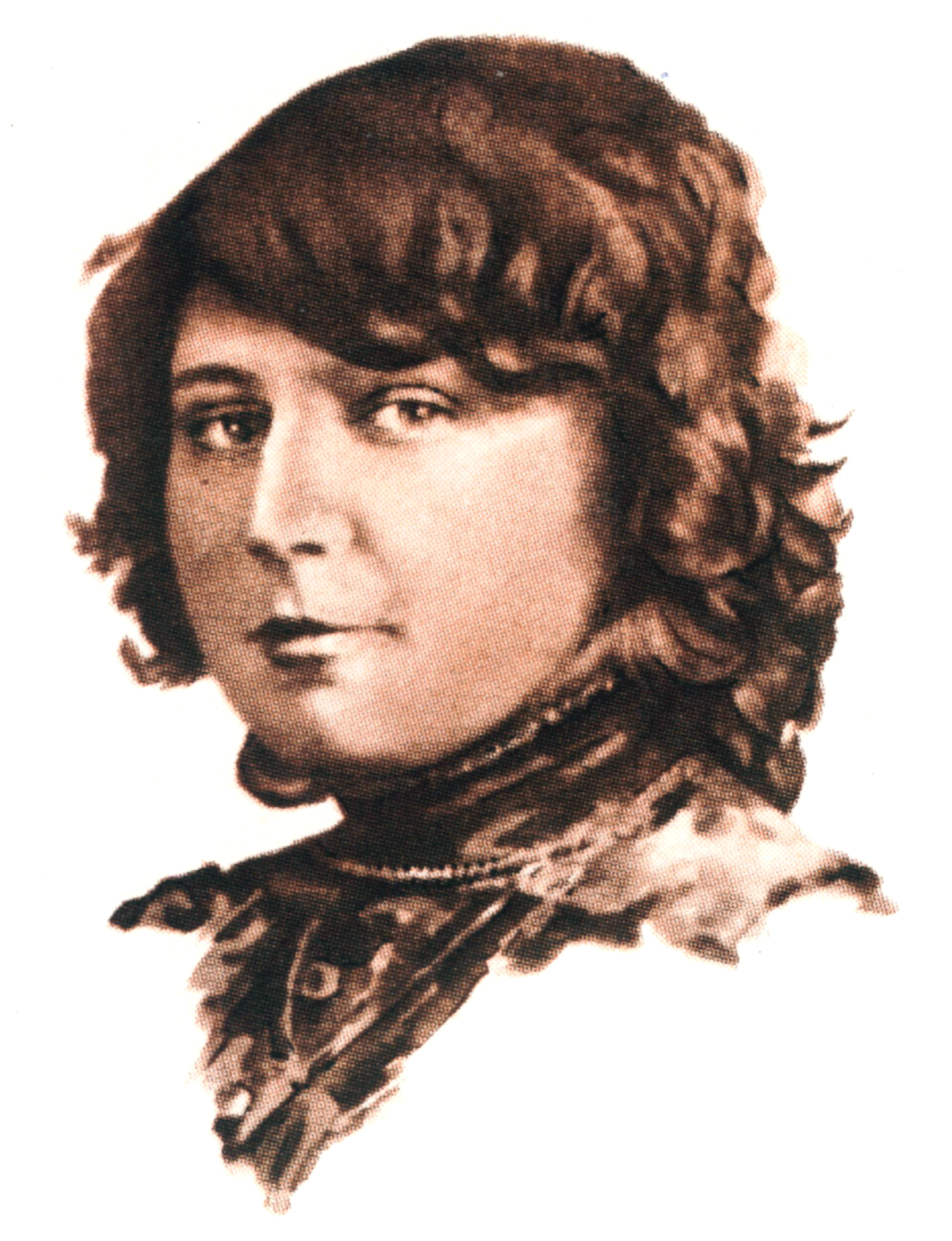
USSR stamp featuring Tsvetaeva (1991)

=== Satire ===
Satire is a secondary element after lyricism in Tsvetaeva's poetry. Several satirical poems, moreover, are among Tsvetaeva's best-known works: "The Train of Life" ("Poezd zhizni") and "The Floorcleaners' Song" ("Poloterskaya"), both included in After Russia, and The Ratcatcher (Krysolov, 1925–1926), a long, folkloric narrative. The target of Tsvetaeva's satire is everything petty and petty bourgeois. Unleashed against such dull creature comforts is the vengeful, unearthly energy of workers both manual and creative. In her notebook, Tsvetaeva writes of "The Floorcleaners' Song": "Overall movement: the floorcleaners ferret out a house's hidden things, they scrub a fire into the door... What do they flush out? Coziness, warmth, tidiness, order... Smells: incense, piety. Bygones. Yesterday... The growing force of their threat is far stronger than the climax." The Ratcatcher poem, which Tsvetaeva describes as a lyrical satire, is loosely based on the legend of the Pied Piper of Hamelin. The Ratcatcher, which is also known as The Pied Piper, is considered by some to be the finest of Tsvetaeva's work. It was also partially an act of homage to Heinrich Heine's poem Die Wanderratten. The Ratcatcher appeared initially, in serial format, in the émigré journal Volya Rossii in 1925–1926 whilst still being written. It was not to appear in the Soviet Union until after the death of Joseph Stalin in 1956. Its hero is the Pied Piper of Hamelin who saves a town from hordes of rats and then leads the town's children away too, in retribution for the citizens' ingratitude. As in the other folkloric narratives, The Ratcatcher's story line emerges indirectly through numerous speaking voices which shift from invective, to extended lyrical flights, to pathos.

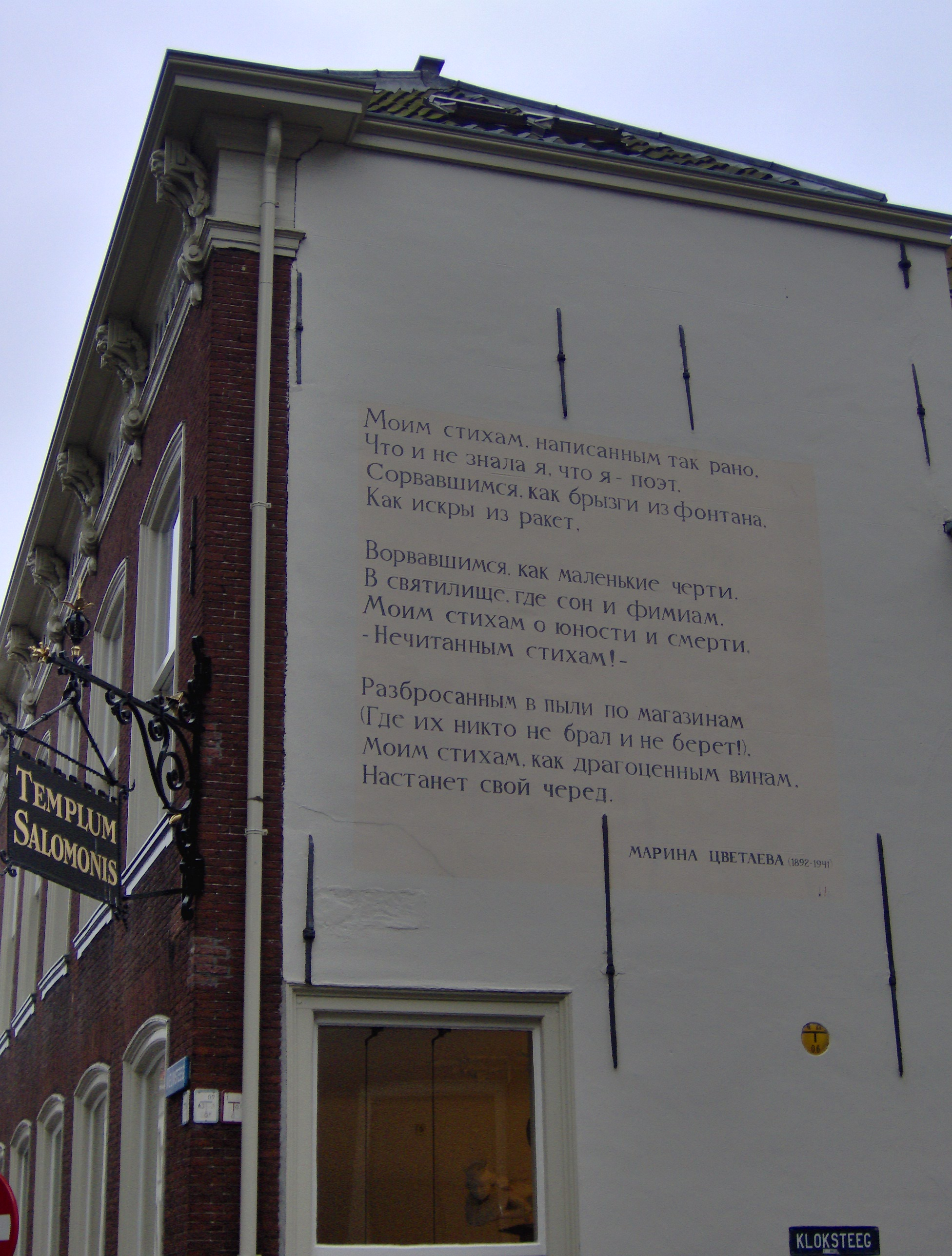
The poem "For my poems" by Tsvetaeva on a wall of the building at Nieuwsteeg 1, Leiden, Netherlands

Tsvetaeva's last ten years of exile, from 1928 when "After Russia" appeared until her return in 1939 to the Soviet Union, were principally a "prose decade", though this would almost certainly be by dint of economic necessity rather than one of choice.

=== Translators ===
Translators of Tsvetaeva's work into English include Elaine Feinstein and David McDuff. Nina Kossman translated many of Tsvetaeva's long (narrative) poems, as well as her lyrical poems; they are collected in three books, Poem of the End (bilingual edition published by Ardis in 1998, by Overlook in 2004, and by Shearsman Books in 2021), In the Inmost Hour of the Soul (Humana Press, 1989), and Other Shepherds (Poets & Traitors Press, 2020). Robin Kemball translated the cycle The Demesne of the Swans, published as a separate (bilingual) book by Ardis in 1980. J. Marin King translated a great deal of Tsvetaeva's prose into English, compiled in a book called A Captive Spirit. Tsvetaeva scholar Angela Livingstone has translated a number of Tsvetaeva's essays on art and writing, compiled in a book called Art in the Light of Conscience. Livingstone's translation of Tsvetaeva's "The Ratcatcher" was published as a separate book. Mary Jane White has translated the early cycle "Miles" in a book called "Starry Sky to Starry Sky", as well as Tsvetaeva's elegy for Rilke, "New Year's", (Adastra Press 16 Reservation Road, Easthampton, MA 01027 USA) and "Poem of the End" (The Hudson Review, Winter 2009; and in the anthology Poets Translate Poets, Syracuse U. Press 2013) and "Poem of the Hill", (New England Review, Summer 2008) and Tsvetaeva's 1914–1915 cycle of love poems to Sophia Parnok. In 2002, Yale University Press published Jamey Gambrell's translation of post-revolutionary prose, entitled Earthly Signs: Moscow Diaries, 1917–1922, with notes on poetic and linguistic aspects of Tsvetaeva's prose, and endnotes for the text itself.

== Tributes and reception ==
In the town of Yelabuga, the Tsvetaeva house is now a museum; there is a monument to her. The apartment in Moscow where she lived from 1914 to 1922 is now a museum as well. Much of her poetry was republished in the Soviet Union after 1961, and her passionate, articulate and precise work, with its daring linguistic experimentation, brought her increasing recognition as a major Russian poet.

A minor planet, 3511 Tsvetaeva, discovered in 1982 by Soviet astronomer Lyudmila Karachkina, is named after her.

In 1989, in Gdynia, Poland, a special-purpose ship was built for the Russian Academy of Sciences and named Marina Tsvetaeva in her honor. From 2007, the ship served as a tourist vessel to the polar regions for Aurora Expeditions. In 2011, she was renamed MV Ortelius and is currently operated by Oceanwide Expeditions as a tourist vessel in the polar regions.

On 8 October 2015, Google Doodle commemorated her 123rd birthday.

In 2017, Zerkalo ("Mirror"), American magazine in MN for Russian-speaking readers made a special publication to the 125th Anniversary of Tsvetaeva's birth. The article "Marina Tsvetaeva in America" was written by Dr. Uli Zislin, the founder and director of the Washington Museum of Russian Poetry and Music.

=== Music and songs ===
In 1973, Soviet composer Dmitri Shostakovich set six of Tsvetaeva's poems in his Six Poems by Marina Tsvetayeva. Later the Russian-Tatar composer Sofia Gubaidulina wrote an Hommage à Marina Tsvetayeva featuring her poems. Her poem "Mne Nravitsya..." ("I like that..."), was performed by Alla Pugacheva in the film The Irony of Fate. In 2003, the opera Marina: A Captive Spirit, based on Tsvetaeva's life and work, premiered from American Opera Projects in New York with music by Deborah Drattell and libretto by poet Annie Finch. The production was directed by Anne Bogart and the part of Tsvetaeva was sung by Lauren Flanigan. The poetry by Tsvetaeva was set to music and frequently performed as songs by Elena Frolova, Larisa Novoseltseva, Zlata Razdolina and other Russian bards. In 2019, American composer Mark Abel wrote Four Poems of Marina Tsvetaeva, the first classical song cycle of the poet in an English translation. Soprano Hila Plitmann recorded the piece for Abel’s album The Cave of Wondrous Voice.

== Translations into English ==
- Selected Poems, trans. Elaine Feinstein. (Oxford University Press, 1971; 2nd ed., 1981; 3rd ed., 1986; 4th ed., 1993; 5th ed., 1999; 6th ed. 2009 as Bride of Ice: New Selected Poems) ISBN 0-19-211803-X
- The Demesne of the Swans, trans. Robin Kemball (bilingual edition, Ardis, 1980) ISBN 978-0882334936
- Marina Tsvetayeva: Selected Poems, trans. David McDuff. (Bloodaxe Books, 1987) ISBN 978-1852240257
- "Starry Sky to Starry Sky (Miles)", trans. Mary Jane White. (Holy Cow! Press, 1988), ISBN 0-930100-25-5 (paper) and ISBN 0-930100-26-3 (cloth)
- In the Inmost Hour of the Soul: Poems by Marina Tsvetayeva , trans. Nina Kossman (Humana Press, 1989) ISBN 0-89603-137-3
- Black Earth, trans. Elaine Feinstein (The Delos Press and The Menard Press, 1992) ISBN I-874320-00-4 and ISBN I-874320-05-5 (signed ed.)
- "After Russia", trans. Michael Nayden (Ardis, 1992).
- A Captive Spirit: Selected Prose, trans. J. Marin King (Vintage Books, 1994) ISBN 0-86068-397-4
- Poem of the End: Selected Narrative and Lyrical Poems , trans. Nina Kossman (Ardis / Overlook, 1998, 2004) ISBN 0-87501-176-4 ; Poem of the End: Six Narrative Poems, trans. Nina Kossman (Shearsman Books, 2021) ISBN 978-1-84861-778-0)
- The Ratcatcher: A Lyrical Satire, trans. Angela Livingstone (Northwestern University, 2000) ISBN 0-8101-1816-5
- Letters: Summer 1926 (Boris Pasternak, Marina Tsvetayeva, Rainer Maria Rilke) (New York Review Books, 2001)
- Earthly Signs: Moscow Diaries, 1917–1922, ed. & trans. Jamey Gambrell (Yale University Press, 2002) ISBN 0-300-06922-7
- Phaedra: a drama in verse; with New Year's Letter and other long poems, trans. Angela Livingstone (Angel Classics, 2012) ISBN 978-0946162819
- "To You – in 10 Decades", trans. by Alexander Givental and Elysee Wilson-Egolf (Sumizdat 2012) ISBN 978-0-9779852-7-2
- Moscow in the Plague Year, translated by Christopher Whyte (180 poems written between November 1918 and May 1920) (Archipelago Press, New York, 2014), 268pp, ISBN 978-1-935744-96-2
- Milestones (1922), translated by Christopher Whyte (Bristol, Shearsman Books, 2015), 122p, ISBN 978-1-84861-416-1
- After Russia: The First Notebook, translated by Christopher Whyte (Bristol, Shearsman Books, 2017), 141 pp, ISBN 978-1-84861-549-6
- After Russia: The Second Notebook, translated by Christopher Whyte (Bristol, Shearsman Books, 2018) 121 pp, ISBN 978-1-84861-551-9
- "Poem of the End" in "From A Terrace in Prague, A Prague Poetry Anthology", trans. Mary Jane White, ed. Stephan Delbos (Univerzita Karlova v Praze, 2011) ISBN 978-80-7308-349-6
- Youthful Verses, translated by Christopher Whyte (Bristol, Shearsman Books, 2021), 114 pp, ISBN 9781848617315
- Head on a Gleaming Plate: Poems 1917-1918, translated by Christopher Whyte (Bristol, Shearsman Books, 2022), 120 pp, ISBN 9781848618435
- Poems, trans. Alyssa Gillespie (Columbia University Press, forthcoming)
- Three by Tsvetaeva, trans. Andrew Davis (New York Review Books, 2024)
