= Nina Kossman =

Russian-American writer, translator and artist

Nina Kossman (Нина Косман)
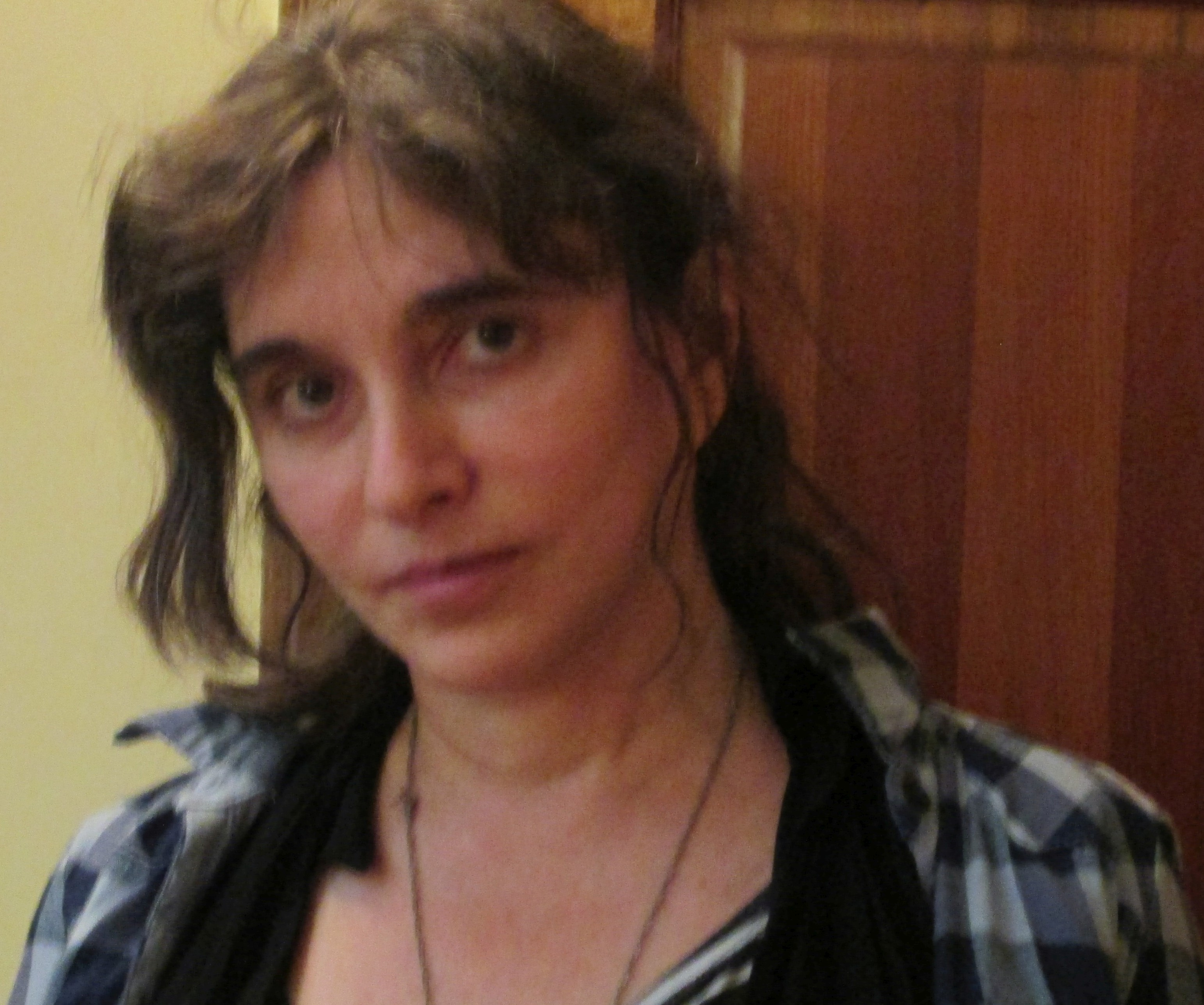
- Born: Moscow
- Citizenship: American
- Education: Bennington
- Occupation: Author
- Writing career
- Language: English, Russian
- Genres: Migrant Literature, Immigration in Literature, Immigrant Literature, Bilingual Poetry, Russian poetry

Nina Kossman (Russian: Нина Косман [Kosman]; born in Moscow, USSR) is a Soviet-born American author, short story writer, poet, memoirist, playwright, translator of Russian poetry, editor, and artist.

== Life and career ==
Nina Kossman was born in Moscow and emigrated from the Soviet Union in 1972 with her family. She resides in New York. She has authored, edited, and/or translated more than nine books in English and Russian. She is the recipient of an NEA (National Endowment for the Arts) fellowship and grants from the Foundation for Hellenic Culture and the Onassis Public Benefit Foundation. Her work has been translated from English into French; Russian; Spanish; Hebrew; Persian; Chinese; Italian; Bulgarian; Danish; Albanian, Greek, and Dutch, while Behind the Border, her book of short stories about her childhood in the Soviet Union, has been translated into Japanese. In addition to writing in English (her second language), she writes poetry and prose in her first language, Russian, and has an extensive list of publications in major Russian-language journals, in and outside of Russia. In 2021, she became the founding editor of EastWest Literary Forum, a bilingual literary magazine, published in Russian & English.

=== Critical reception ===
Literary critic Cynthia Haven writes in The Book Haven, in her review of Kossman's book "Other Shepherds": "Twenty years ago, critic Harold Bloom wrote to the young poet Nina Kossman to tell her that her "intensely eloquent" translations of the poet Marina Tsvetaeva manage to "capture the doom-eager splendor of a superbly gifted poet." W.S. Merwin wrote that these are "direct, strong, audible translations," adding, "I hear Tsvetaeva's voice, more of it, and in a new pitch, which makes something clear in her poems that I had only guessed at".

Poet and literary critic Emma Lee writes in her review of Kossman's book "Other Shepherds": "Nina Kossman was born in Russia and is bilingual in Russian and English. Initially, she wrote in Russian because 'English was the language I had to use in the outside world—at school, in the city, etc. Instead, my poems sprang from the interior world, and at that age, I resisted the outside world and created—possibly at the expense of a comfortable co-existence with my peers—a world of my own.' The themes of alienation in Marina Tsvetaeva's poems spoke to Kossman's experience."

Canadian culture and literary critic Donald Brackett writes about Kossman in his review of her book published in Critics at Large: "Alienation and nostalgia are, of course, the bread and butter of most exiles, but in the case of Kossman, displaced in America during its own time of social and political upheaval (one hauntingly like our own era today), those emotional states, shared by the older poet, were intangibles that could potentially damage or even destroy a person if they gave in to them without resistance but which could, as Tsvetaeva herself so clearly demonstrated in a model manner, also transform themselves into the raw material for the art of poetry. Initially, consumed by and consuming what she called this "cocktail of nostalgia, alienation, and immersion in Tsvetaeva" enabled Kossman to embark upon the writing of her own poems, in Russian despite the fact that she was now living in English."

Russian literary critic and poet Daniil Chkonia writes in his introduction to Kossman's poems in Emigrantskaya Lira, a major Russian poetry journal: "Nina Kossman's poems … combine ancient Greek myths with modern sensibility…She skillfully interweaves historical/cultural layers with events of our time, creating her own picture of life, in its continuity and unity."

Aleksey Sinitsyn, a Russian literary critic and novelist, writes in his review of the Russian edition of Kossman's novel: "...this is intellectual prose of outstanding artistic merit [...] The author manages to show subtleties of communication between the individual and the collective, the factual and the mythological, the historical and the personal, and to demonstrate the connection that makes the fate of an individual inseparable from the fate of her people."

Another Russian critic, Olga Bugoslavskaya, writes in her review of Kossman's novel "Queen of the Jews": "…our former compatriot Nina Kossman offers her own version of a love story, set against a backdrop of animosity. ... Her novel… is poetic, beautiful and stylistically original. It rehabilitates the concept of the literary use of ideology and points out a fatal mistake we all make when we begin to rely on common clichés, averting our eyes from reality."

=== Early life and family ===
Nina Kossman emigrated from the Soviet Union with her family in 1972 and came to the US in 1973. Her father, Leonid Kossman, was a linguist, philologist, author of textbooks on German phraseology and English usage and grammar for Russian speakers, and journalist who emigrated from Russia twice (in 1918 and 1972). He managed to leave Riga (Latvia) three days before the occupation of Latvia by the Nazi army. All the remaining members of his family, including his wife (Teresa Jacobi) and mother (Ruth Brenson), perished in the Holocaust in Riga. Nina Kossman's maternal grandfather was killed by Stalinists during the Great Terror; his wife, Nina Kossman's maternal grandmother, was sentenced to a term in a GULAG camp as "a member of a family of an enemy of the people". Nina Kossman's mother, Maya Borisovna Shternberg, was a biologist, whose career was cut down by Lysenkoism. Her maternal great-grandmother's family was killed in the Holocaust in Ukraine. Her paternal great-grandfather was Isidor Brenson, a physician and historian of Baltic medicine.

== Selected bibliography ==
=== Books ===
- No One Talks About the War: Travels in Ukraine During the War (Open Ends Press, 2026)
- Gods of Unfinished Business (poetry). Massachusetts: Cervena Barva Press, 2025.-Nina-Kossman/dp/195006364X/ref=sr_1_4?crid=NXYSEEBT1O7J&dib=eyJ2IjoiMSJ9.vPvzJqm1YIj697wQdW2YfcmwNp-Fvz2bJ7nTshBz5pfeFHC26zuG04mkgDp77jnX5qBndXRSKQd2g1F983_JtTw9whZjpXO4gXYZRW-WZy1LTgxfXi7LuWEVSu9wn6xs848zLPyHBCk-Eo8ezSJeP99biYT6JRBYiM6gwJcEJcVxmRhxuMfqOuIyWTjcWwCVKJePwrXNMuFLXHclcgPX8Us-eeJCwp6UpTElmp7Xvdo.2LCt7_tjS5cFFuVUpfm3zZBXep6tde901jjEQJlZpvA&dib_tag=se&keywords=nina+kossman+books&qid=1759167373&sprefix=nina+kossman+books%2Caps%2C243&sr=8-4</ref>
- Оправдание мартышки (a collection of short stories in Russian). Kyiv: Друкарський двір, 2024.
- Poem of the End. 6 Narrative Poems. Translated by Nina Kossman. Swindon, UK: Shearsman Books, 2021.
- "Other Shepherds" (a collection of original poems by Nina Kossman alongside her translations of Marina Tsvetaeva's poems). New York: Poets & Traitors Press, 2020.
- "Царица иудейская" Москва: Рипол, 2019. (The original was published in London in 2015, 2017.)
- "Gods and Mortals: Modern Poems on Classical Myths" anthology (editor). New York: Oxford University Press, 2001.
- Behind the Border. New York, 1994 (hardcover), 1996 (paperback).
- Behind the Border in Japanese. Tokyo: Asunaro Shobo, 1994.
- Poem of the End: Selected and Narrative Lyrical Poems of Marina Tsvetaeva. Translated by Nina Kossman. Ann Arbor: Ardis Publishers, 1998. New York: Overlook Press, 2004. New York: Abrams Press, 2009.
- По правую руку сна. (Transliteration): Po Pravuyu ruku sna. Poems in Russian. Philadelphia, 1996.
- In the Inmost Hour of the Soul. Selected poems by Marina Tsvetaeva. Translated by Nina Kossman. Clifton: Humana Press, 1989.
- Перебои (Pereboi), Poems in Russian. Художественная литература, 1990. Нина Косман (Коссман) Moscow: Hudozhestvennaya Literatura, 1990.

=== Selected poems in anthologies ===
- Two poems, with English translations by Dmitri Manin, in "Dislocation" (an Anthology of Poetic Response to Russia's War in Ukraine), Slavica, 2024
- Poems in "Disbelief: 100 Russian Anti-War Poems" (Smokestack Books, 2023).
- "Like Lambs" (translated by Mary Jane White) in "101 Jewish Poems for the Third Millennium", an anthology edited by Nancy Carlson & M. Silverman. Ashland Press, 2020. (First line of the original, in Russian: "Как ягнят")
- Five poems in Russian Women Poets. Modern Poetry in Translation
- Poems. An Anthology of Contemporary Russian Women Poets. Edited by Daniel Weissbort and Valentina Polukhina. University of Iowa Press, Iowa City, 2005
- Russian Women Poets, Modern Poetry in Translation, No. 20, King's College, London, 2002
- Four poems in Modern Poems on Classical Myths, an anthology of modern poetry based on classical mythology. Oxford University Press. New York, 2001.
- Poems in Nuestra Voz / Our Voice, Antología del Comité de Escritoras del PEN Club Internacional, Salta, Argentina, 2001.
- Two poems in the anthology "The Gospels in Our Image". New York / San Diego: Harcourt Brace, 1995.
- Two poems in International Women Poets Anthology, LIPS, 1993.

=== Selected poetry in literary journals ===
- Poems in Pratik. Nepal, Kathmandu: Nirala Publications, 2025.
- Poems in Kelp Journal
- "Kharkiv" in Fantastic Imaginary Creatures (an anthology of contemporary prose poems), 2024
- "About the Pied Piper and his Flute" in The Red Wheelbarrow, #16. 2023
- Three poems in Atunis Poetry
- Untitled 2 in Third Wednesday Magazine
- "Ismul, the Boy Warrior" Orpheus, Agamemnon's Shadow Speaks in Carmina Magazine, September 2021.
- Ariadne in Literary Yard
- Three Poems in Trafika Europe/European Literature Network
- Poems in Fictional Cafe
- Poetry in Vox Populi. 2021
- Poetry in Vox Populi. 2021
- Poetry in Vox Populi. 2022
- Giordano Bruno's Unwritten Letter 2021
- Three Poems About a Head (2) Vox Populi. February 2022
- Poetry in Vox Populi. January 2022
- One by One in Another Chicago Magazine, 2021.
- Poems in The Cafe Review, Winter 2021
- Long Poem in Среда Moscow, Russia, 2020
- Four poems in Среда Moscow, Russia, 2020
- Poems in Word City Lit
- Texts in Eratio Postmodern Poetry
- "Flock" in Ekphrastic Review 2020
- Poems in The Classical Outlook, Volume 95, Number 1.
- "Empty Rock" Seven poems in Live Encounters (January 2020).
- "See how they watch you" Seven poems in Live Encounters (December 2019).
- "Lament for Odysseus" Six poems in Live Encounters (September 2019)
- "Forever and Ever", " Show Cooled", and "As I Pass Your Jail Door" in Unlikely Stories.
- A cycle of poems in "Why NiCHT?", a trilingual literary journal (Vienna, Austria). #7, Spring 2018.
- "Shape of a Whisper" in Contemporary Verse 2. The Canadian Journal of Poetry and Critical Thinking, vol. 38, issue 4. Spring 2016.
- "Ismul the Boy Warrior" in Modern Poetry Review. Issue 2, March 2015.
- Four poems in Gods and Mortals: Modern Poems on Classical Myths. Oxford University Press, New York / Oxford, 2001.
- Two poems in Virginia Quarterly Review, vol.72, Number 2, 1996.
- Poems in The Connecticut Poetry Review, Volume 14, number 1, 1995.
- Poems in Prairie Schooner, Volume 70, Number 3, Fall 1996.
- Two poems in Quarterly West, No. 40, Summer 1995.
- Poems in Orbis, no. 89/90, Summer / Autumn 1993, Nuneaton, Warwickshire, UK.
- Two poems in International Women Poets Anthology, LIPS, Issue 17, 1993.
- Poems in The New Renaissance, Vol. VIII, No.2, 1989.
- Poems in Southern Humanities Review, Spring 1986.

=== Selected short stories in literary magazines ===
- "Indiana Jones on a Kharkiv Bus" in Cassandra Voices
- "A Grand Lady Must be a Hundred Years Old" in Cassandra Voices
- "Memories of a Vanished City" in "the other side of hope: journeys in refugee and immigrant literature" (Autumn 2023)
- "Lysenko, Enemy of Soviet Science, and a Dissertation Left on a Windowsill" in Wordcitylit
- "How I Tried to Unite the Parts of My Soul" in Asymptote
- "Net-Neti" in The Best American Poetry Blog
- "About Queen Elizabeth in a Soviet Childhood" Cassandra Voices (Ireland)
- "How I Tried to Unite the Parts of Мy Soul" in Asymptote
- "Sophie's Choice and What I Understood about Profanation" in Litro
- "Memories of a Vanished City" in "the other side of hope: journeys in refugee and immigrant literature" Autumn 2023
- "Lysenko, Enemy of Soviet Science, and a Dissertation Left on a Windowsill" in WordCityLit. August 2023
- Three parables in Cassandra Voices Ireland. Sept. 16, 2022
- Excerpt from a memoir about a trip to Ukraine. Transitions/Артикуляция
- "A Pupil's Revenge" "Whisky Blot"
- "Jaffa Oranges in Schönau Castle" in Pocket Samovar
- "Other People's Thoughts" Mumbermag
- Nonfiction in World Literature Today
- Short story in Usawa Literary Review (Mumbai, India)
- "Prodigy" in EastWest Literary Forum
- Three prose pieces in WordCityLit
- “Farewell to Old Gods" in Carmina Review
- "A Report Card" in The Common
- "I Have No Proof, Except for the Story I Tell Everyone I Meet" in EastWest Literary Forum
- “About a Woman Who Was Glad She Was Born a Woman” and “Read Your Book” in Body.
- "Doll" and "Mother's Love" Word City Lit, 2021.
- "A Translator" in Apofenie, 2021
- * "Ochi" in Mumbermag, issue #2, 2020
- * * “A New Year’s Tree or Atheism in Communist Countries” in Mumbermag, issue #2, 2020
- * * * “Two Dreams About Trump" in Mumbermag, issue #2, 2020
- An excerpt from "The Hasmonean Chronicle" in Word City Lit (December 2020)
- "Story About an Old Wall Rug" Ekphrastic Review
- "I owe my life to a bullet that pierced my father's skull," 'One day, as she was walking around her neighborhood...', and 'One woman decided to stop going to work...' in Unlikely Stories
- "Your Students or Your Customers" in PEN America.
- “Clockwatch” in Tin House, Vol. 5, Number 3, Spring 2004.
- “A Monthly Tea” in Confrontation, No. 72/73, Fall 2000/Winter 2001.
- Nuestra Voz / Our Voice, Anthologia del Comite de Escritoras del PEN Club Internacional, Salta, Argentina, 2001.
- Short Story in Art Times, June 2000.
- “Family Planning” in Michigan Quarterly Review, Arthur Miller issue, University of Michigan, Fall 1998.
- “Spring, 1941” in Columbia, issue 29, 1998. Short Fiction in Prism International, Vol. 36, No.2, Winter 1998.
- Short stories (translated into Dutch) in Horizon, Number 102, winter 1997–1998; Number 103, Summer 1998; Number 104, winter 1998–1999. Belgium.
- "The Episode” in The Threepenny Review, #71, Fall 1997.
- “Sergeichik” in Wind Magazine, Number 80, 1997.
- “Pen International, Volume XIV, Number 2, 1995 (winners of the UNESCO/PEN Short Story Award). London.
- “Enmeshed” in Mundus Artium, A Journal of International Literature and the Arts, Volume XV, Numbers 1&2, 1985.
- “Enmeshed 1” in The New Southern Literary Messenger, Richmond, Virginia, Spring 1985.
- “A Talk, Taped” in Sepia, Cornwall, England, 1985.

=== Plays ===
- “Foreign Gifts in Asymptote
- “Водные процедуры” in Этажи (Etazhi)
- "Foreign Gifts" in Off the Wall Plays.
- Women Playwrights: The Best Plays of 2000. Published by Smith and Kraus, 2001.
- “Mirror” was produced by (among others) Moonlit Wings Productions, Washington D.C., Pag Bol Productions, Ferny Grove State School, Queensland, Australia, 2018, etc.
- Monologues in "221 One-Minute Monologues for Women" Edited by Capecci and Ziegler Aston. Published by Smith and Kraus, 2006.
- “Foreign Gifts” was performed by “Global Female Voices”, London, April 2018; by The Ventura Court Theatre, Studio City, CA, March 1998.
- “Foreign Gifts” was produced by the Theater Arts Department, Virginia Tech University, Blacksburg, VA, in 2017.
- One-act plays (From Russia with Gum, The Road to City Hall, Miracles) were produced by The Theatre Studio, 1997–1998; “Miracles” was produced in New York, New Jersey, and London.

=== Art ===
- Paintings in Live Encounters
- Paintings in EWLF
- Paintings in Мастерская
- Sculptures in So to Speak
- Paintings in Новый Континент
- NER (New England Review) Paintings in Inprnt
- Paintings in National Translation Month
- Paintings. Fine Arts America
- Paintings. Nina Kossman's art on YouTube

== Selected exhibitions ==
- Dreamscapes (2011)
- The World According to Deer (2012)
- Ancient Gods in Painting (2013)
- Metamorphosis of Soul (2017)
- Ita Est (2018)
- Paintings of Rebirth (2018)
- Dreams of a Refugee (2019)
- Myths and Mirrors: Kossman in Cozmos (2024)
- Myth Images. A Solo Exhibition at MORA Museum of International Art (Jersey City), December 2025
- Art Expo New York (April 2026)

== Gallery ==
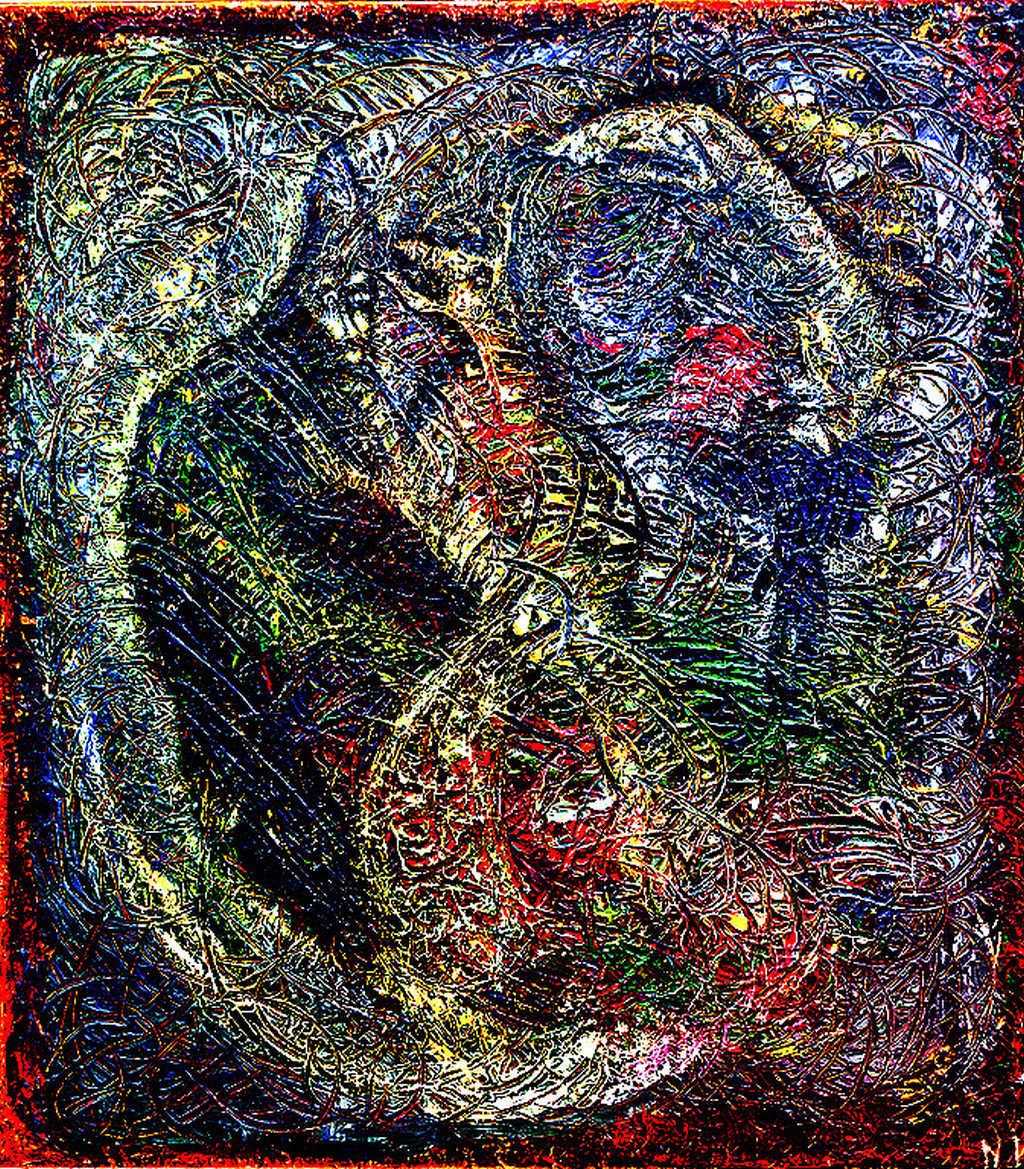
Birth of the Snake in the Garden of Eden

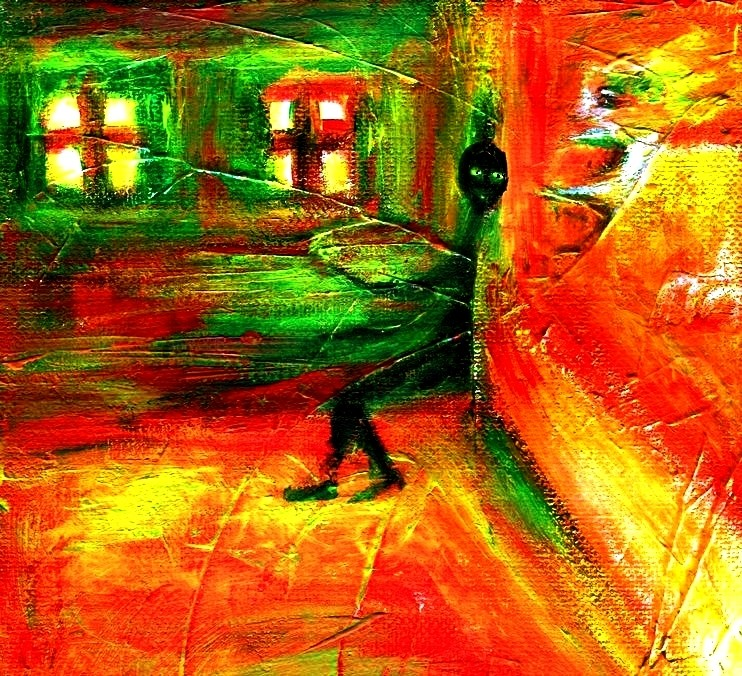
Redrum, redrum

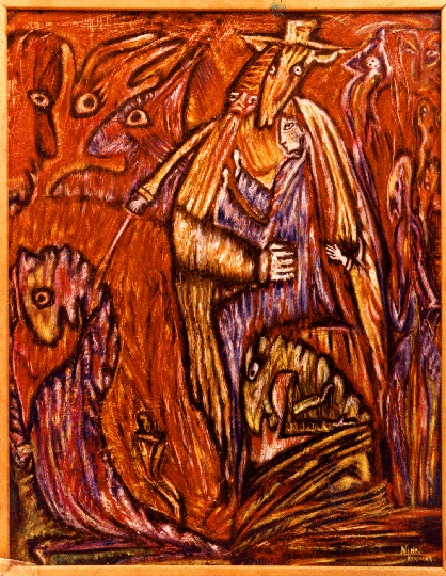
Abduction of Ludmila

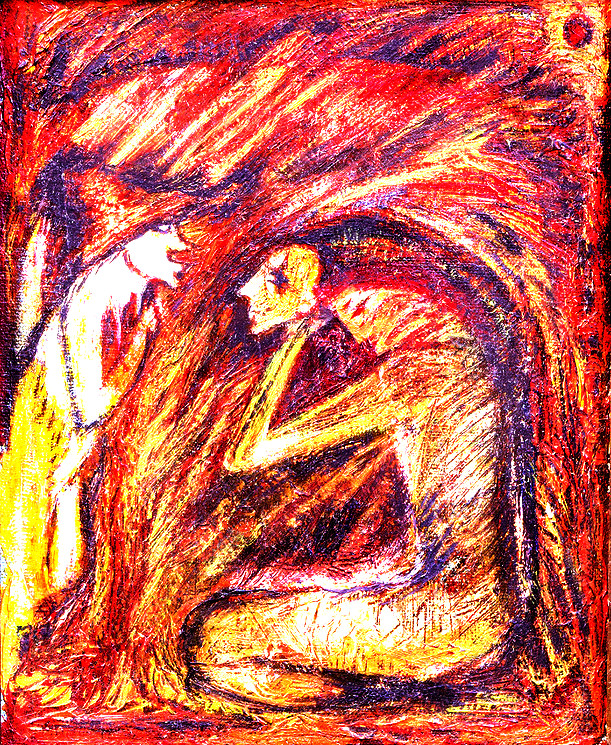
This is How He Met His Self

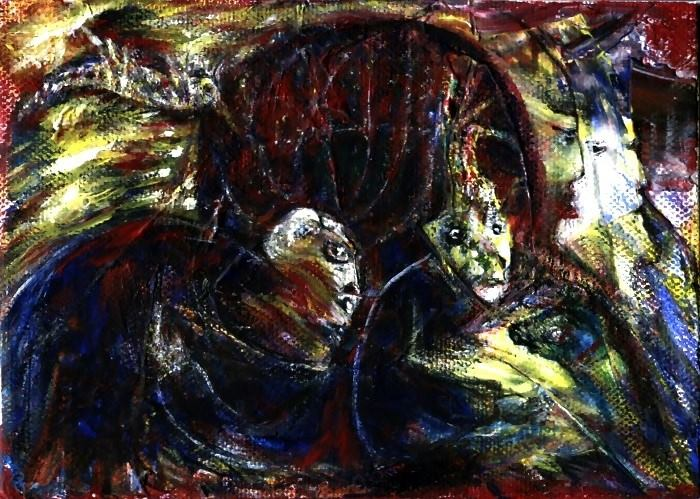
Rumpelstiltskin's Parents

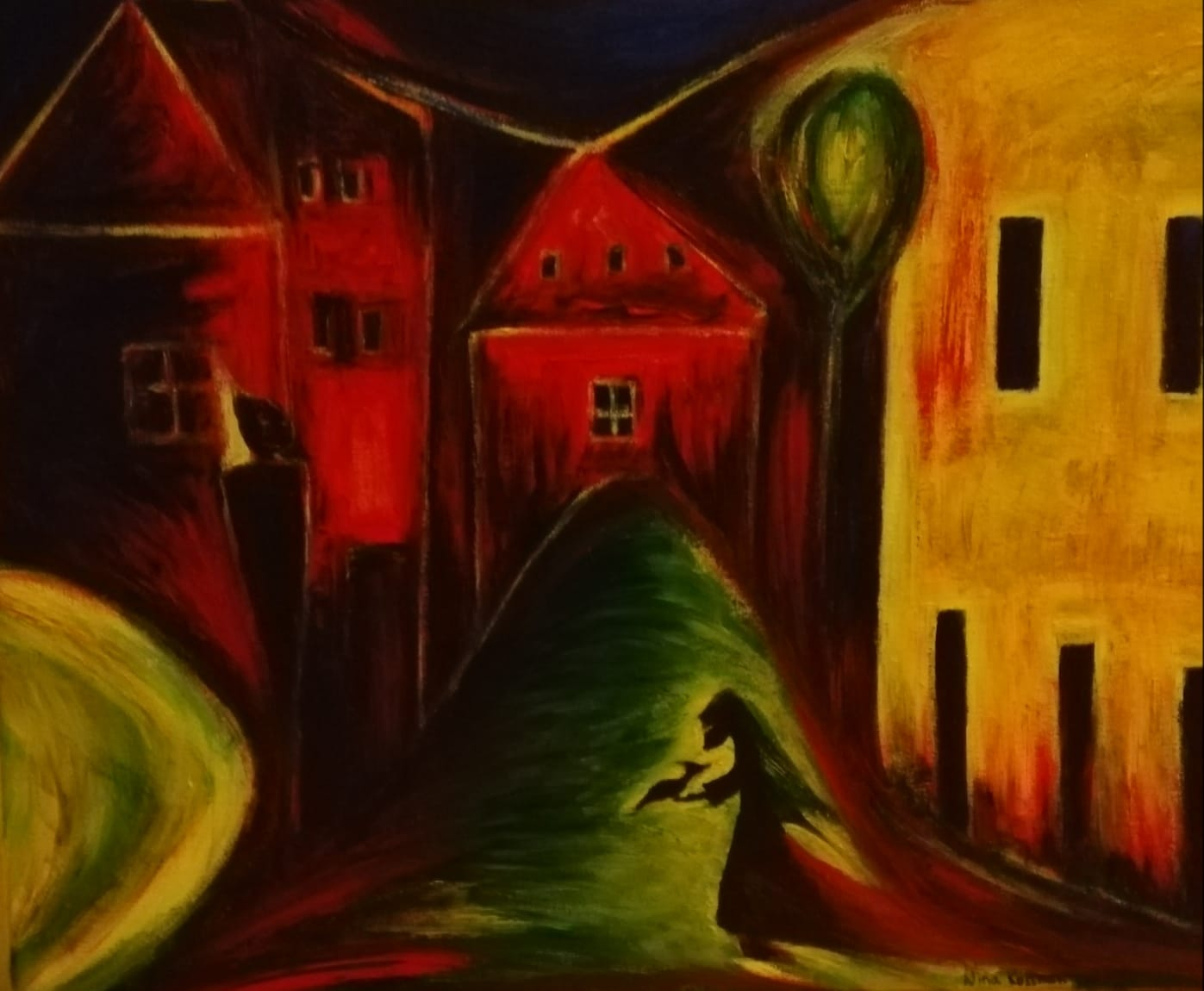
Donation for a Dark Spirit

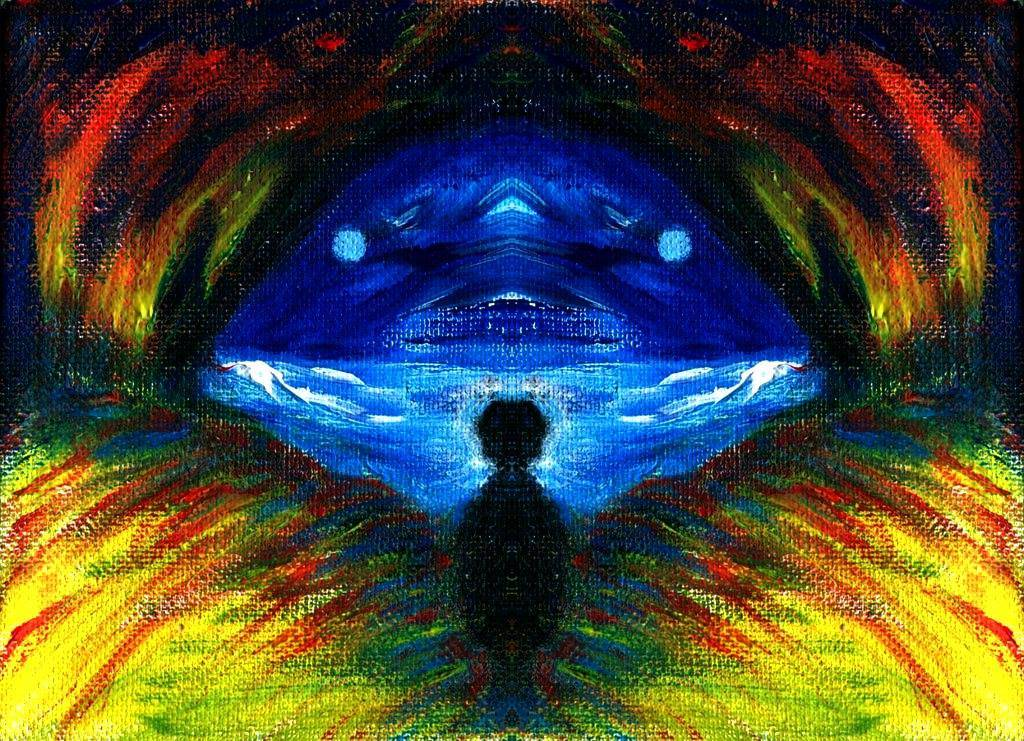
The One Who Stares Into the Void

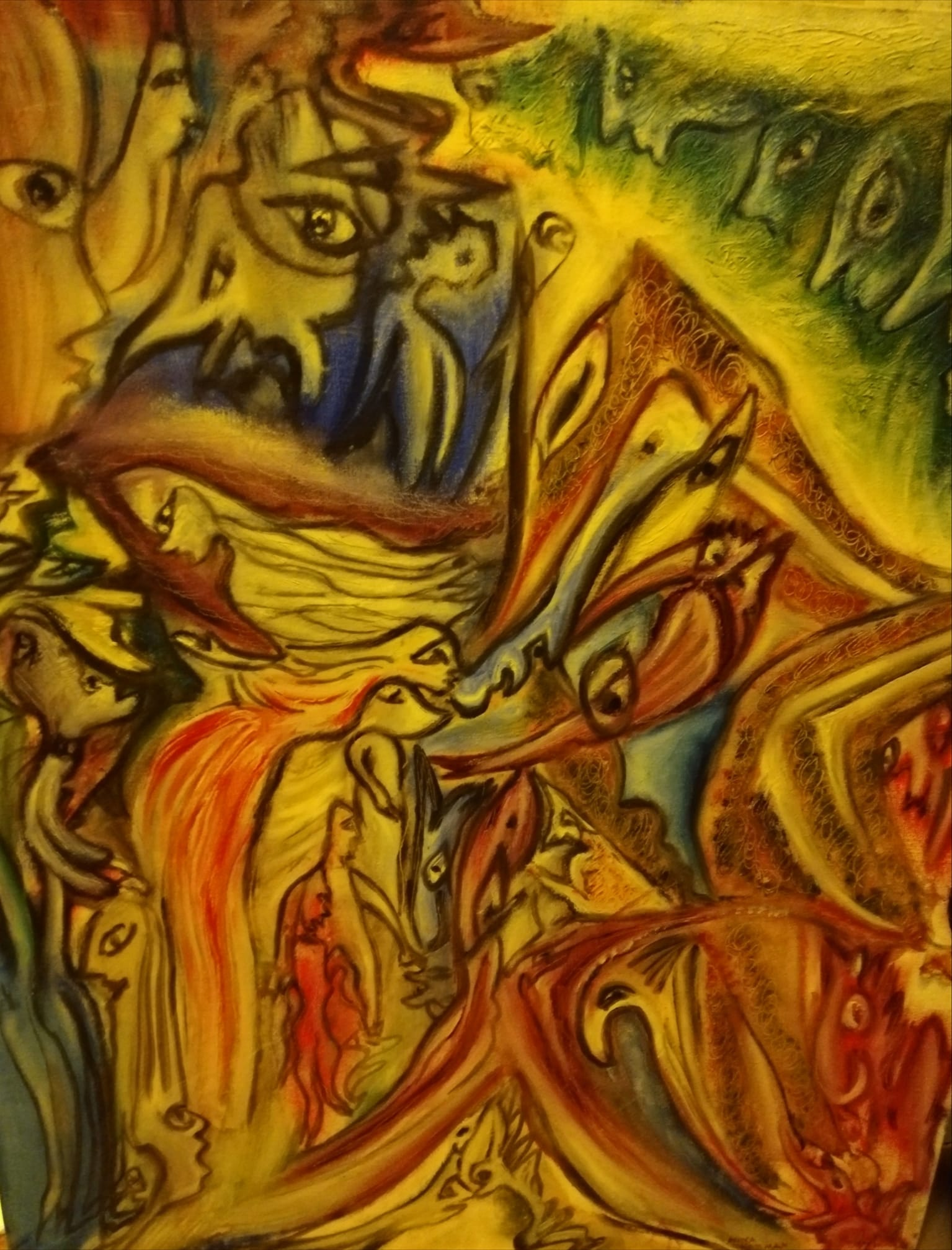
Reunion of Animals and Men

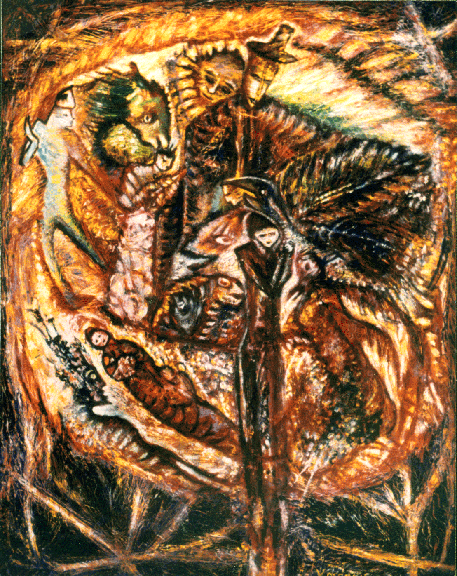
Tree of Life

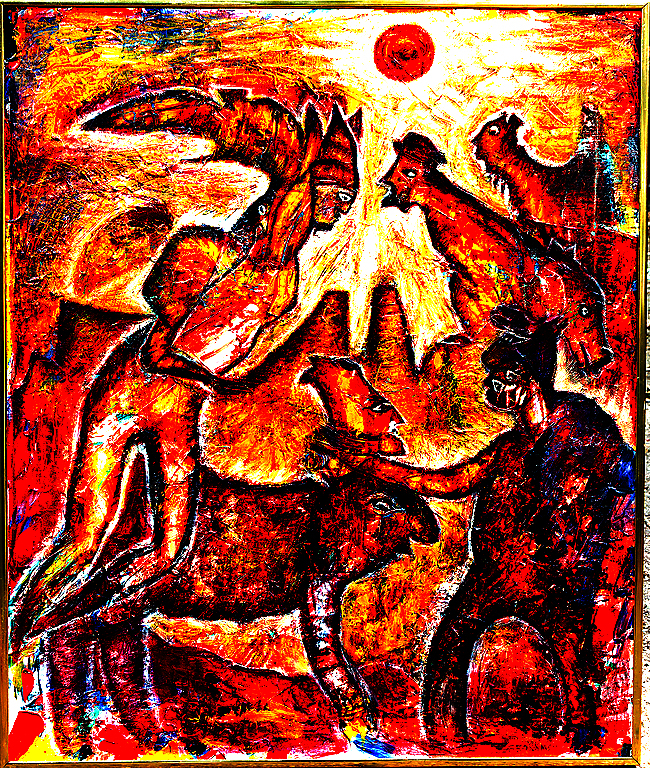
Mars

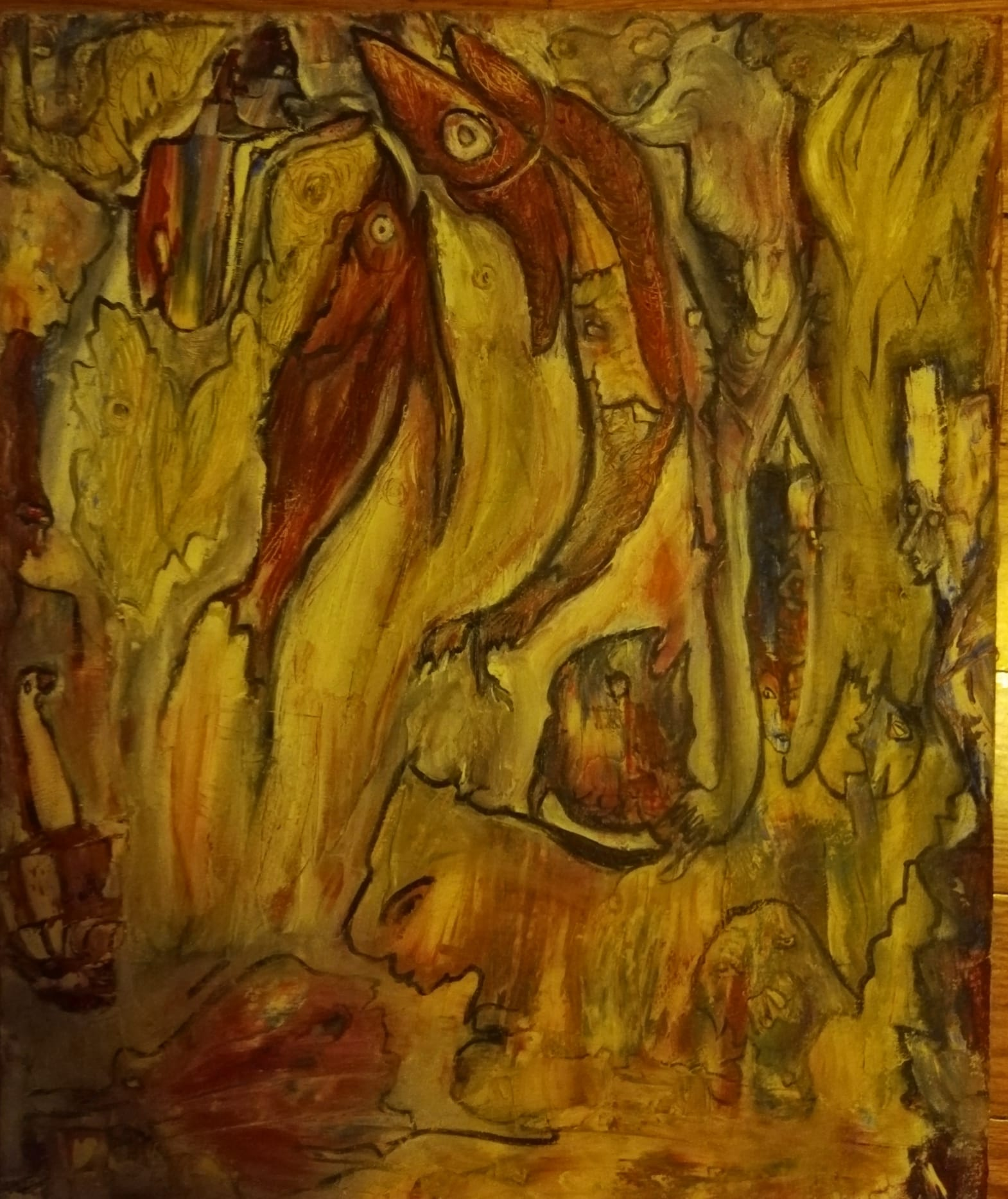
Up from the Sea

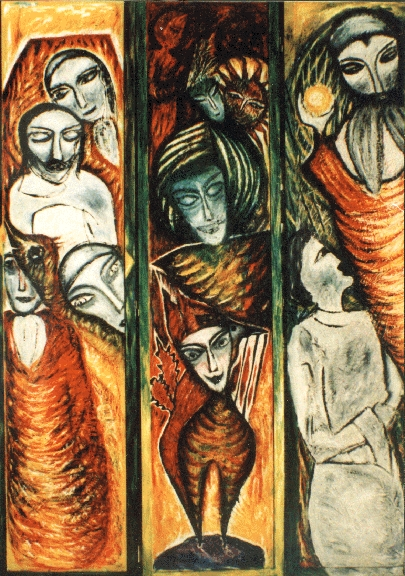
Three Sides of Faith
