= Ariadna Efron =

Author and daughter of Maria Tsvetaeva

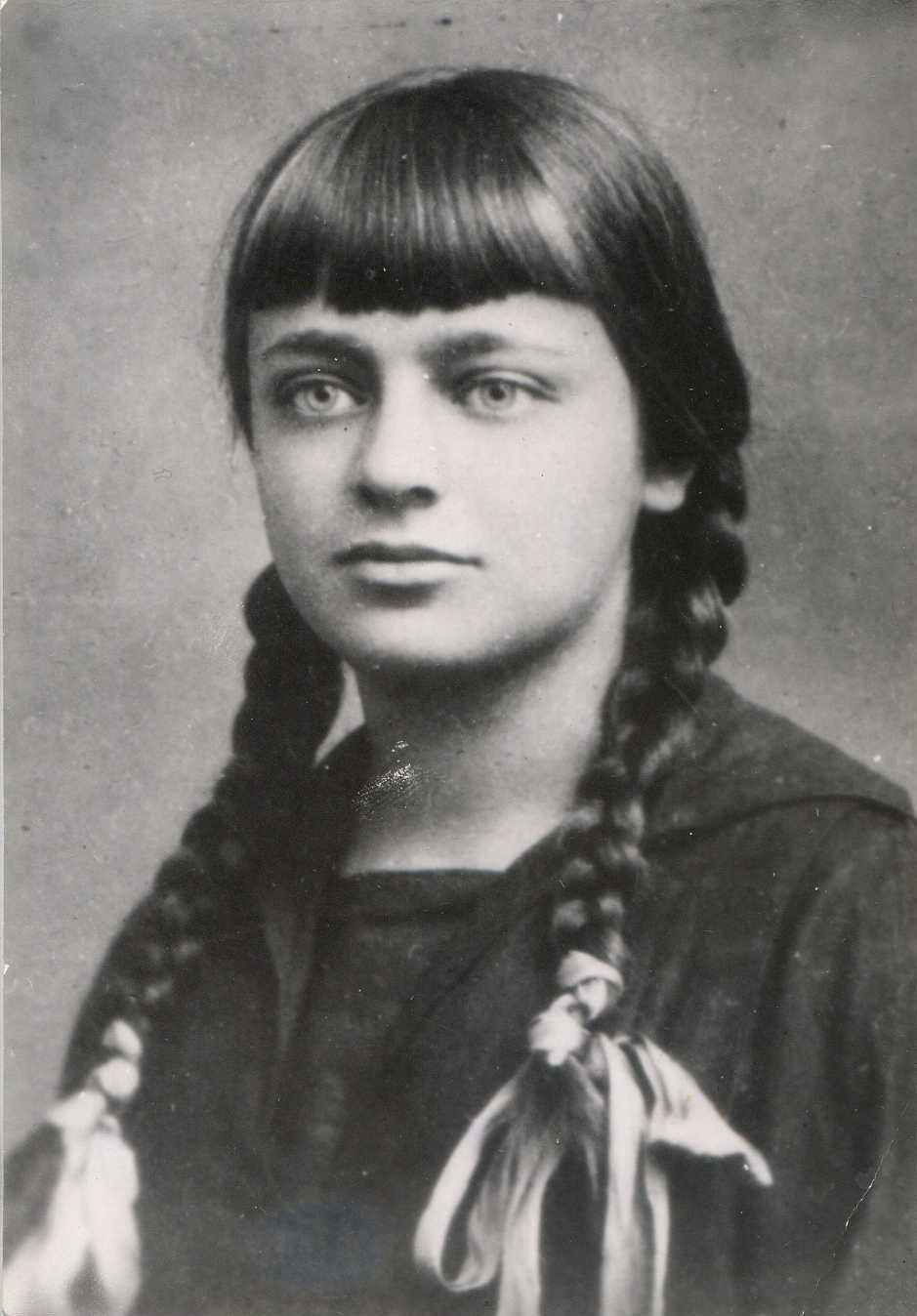
- Efron in 1926
- Born: Ariadna Sergeyevna Efron; 18 September 1912; Moscow, Russian Empire
- Died: 26 July 1975 (aged 62); Tarusa, Kaluga Oblast, Soviet Union
- Education: École du Louvre, Paris
- Occupations: poet, translator, visual artist
- Partner: Samuil Gurevich (common-law)

Ariadna Sergeyevna Efron (Russian: Ариадна Сергеевна Эфрон; 18 September [O.S. 5 September] 1912 – 26 July 1975) was a Russian poet, memoirist, artist, art critic, and translator of prose and poetry. Her original poems, except for those written in childhood, were not printed during her lifetime. She was a daughter of poets Sergei Efron and Marina Tsvetaeva.

== Life ==
=== Early life ===
Efron's parents and relatives called Ariadna Alya; her mother Tsvetaeva devoted a large number of poems to her (including the cycle "Poems to her Daughter"). Efron herself wrote poems from early childhood (20 poems were published by her mother in her collection "Psyche"), and she kept diaries. In 1922, she went abroad with her mother.

=== Emigration ===
From 1922 to 1925, Efron lived in Czechoslovakia, and from 1925 to 1937 in France, from where, on 18 March 1937, she was the first of her family to return to the USSR.

In Paris, she graduated from the Duperré School of Applied Arts, where she studied book design, engraving, lithography, and from the École du Louvre where she majored in art history.

She worked for the French magazines Russie d'Aujourd'hui ('Russia Today'), France-URSS ('France-URSS'), Pour-Vous ('For You'), as well as for the pro-Soviet magazine Nash Soviet ('Our Union'), which was published by the "Union of Returning Soviet Citizens" (Союз возвращенцев на Родину). She wrote articles and essays and produced translations, illustrations). Her translations in to French included works by Mayakovsky and other Soviet poets.

The "Union of Returning Soviet Citizens" was in fact a cover organization of the NKVD, but Efron accepted this and supplied the NKVD information on exiled Russians and those wanting to return to the USSR.

=== After the return to the USSR ===
After returning to the USSR, Efron worked in the editorial board of the Soviet magazine Revue de Moscou (published in French). She wrote articles, essays, reports, made illustrations and produced translations.

=== In prison camps and in exile ===
On 27 August 1939, Efron was arrested by the NKVD and convicted by the OSO under article 58-6 (espionage) to eight years of forced labour in labour camps. She was tortured and forced to testify against her father. She only learned afterwards about the death of her parents in 1941 (her mother committed suicide in the evacuation in Yelabuga, and her father was shot).

In the spring of 1943, Efron refused to cooperate with the camp leadership and become a "snitch", and she was transferred to a logging camp in the Sevzheldorlag, a penal camp. An actress of the camp theater, Tamara Slanskaya, managed to ask someone for an envelope so she could write her husband, Gurevich: "If you want to save Alya, try to rescue her from the North." According to Slanskaya, "pretty soon he managed to get her transferred to Mordovia, to Potma".

After her release in 1948, she worked as a teacher of graphics at the art college in Ryazan. After long years of isolation, she felt a great need to communicate with friends, and her life was brightened by correspondence with friends, who included Boris Pasternak who sent her his new poems and chapters from his forthcoming novel Doctor Zhivago. She was so impressed by the book that she wrote to Pasternak:

10/14/48 ... I have a dream, which, due to my circumstances, will not be fulfilled soon – I would like to illustrate the book, slightly differently from the usual way, not like books are usually illustrated, i.e. cover, title page etc,. no, I would like to do some drawings with a pen, to try to have on paper certain characters the way I see them with my eyes, you understand, don't you, to capture them…

Efron was again arrested on 22 February 1949 and sentenced, on the basis of her previous conviction, to a life in exile in the Turukhansky District of the Krasnoyarsk Krai. Thanks to her education in France, she was able to work in Turukhansk as an artist-designer in the cultural center of the local district. She produced a series of watercolor sketches about life in exile, some of which were first published only in 1989.

In 1955, she was rehabilitated as there was no proof of criminal activity. She now returned to Moscow, where in 1962 she became a member of the Union of Soviet Writers. In the 1960s and 1970s, she lived in one of the buildings of the ZhSK of the Union of Soviet Writer" (Krasnoarmeyskaya St., 23).

=== Death ===
From her youth, Efron had a heart condition; she suffered several heart attacks.

She died in a hospital in Tarusa from a massive heart attack on 26 July 1975 and was buried in the town cemetery. Tarusa is a small town 102 km from Moscow which had been a popular place for writers and artists, including Marina Tsvetayeva's parents who had had a villa there. During the Soviet era, many members of the dissident intelligentsia had settled in Tarusa, as they were forbidden to live less than 100 km from Moscow.

Efron edited for publication works of her mother and took care of her archives. She left behind her memoirs, which were published in the magazines Literaturnaja Armenija- ja Zvezda. She had also produced a lot of translations of poetry, mainly the works of French poets, such as Victor Hugo, Charles Baudelaire, Paul Verlaine, Théophile Gautier, etc. She also wrote many original poems, which were only published in the 1990s.

Her common-law husband ("my first and last husband") was Samuil Davidovich Gurevich (in the family known as Mulya; 1904–1951; he was executed in the Stalinist repressions), a journalist, translator, and editor-in-chief of the journal Za Rubezhom ('Abroad'). Efron had no children.

== Publications ==
- Efron, Ariadna (1982). Письма из ссылки. Ариадна Эфрон Б.Пастернаку (in Russian). Paris: YMCA-PRESS. p. 182. ISBN 2-85065-012-9.
- Efron, Ariadna (1989). О Марине Цветаевой: Воспоминания дочери (in Russian). Moskova: Sovetskiĭ pisatel. p. 480. ISBN 5-265-00670-2. Archived from the original on 10 August 2011.
- Efron, Ariadna (1996). А душа не тонет. Письма 1942–1975. Воспоминания (in Russian). Moskova: Kul'tura.
- Efron, Ariadna (2003). Рисунок. Акварель. Гравюра [Drawings, water colours, gravures] (in Russian). Moskova: Vozvraščenije. p. 72. ISBN 5-88149-134-3.
- Efron, Ariadna (2008). История жизни, история души (3 volumes). Составление, подготовка текста, подготовка иллюстраций, примечания Р. Б. Вальбе. Том 1: Письма 1937—1955. Том 2: Письма 1955—1975. Том 3: Воспоминания, проза, стихи, устные рассказы, переводы [Life history, history of the soul] (in Russian). Moskova: Vozvraščenije. p. 1192. ISBN 978-5-7157-0166-4, 978-5-7157-0167-1, 978-5-7157-0168-8.
- Efron, Ariadna; Федерольф Ада (1996). Мироедиха. Рядом с Алей (in Russian). Moskova: Vozvraščenije. p. 368. ISBN 5-7157-0063-9.
- Efron, Ariadna (2004). Жизнь есть животное полосатое. Письма к Ольге Ивинской и Ирине Емельяновой (1955—1975) (in Russian). Moskova: Studija VIGRAF. p. 276. ISBN 5-94437-004-1.
- Efron, Ariadna (2005). Моей зимы снега. Воспоминания, рассказы, письма, стихи, рисунки (in Russian). Moskova: Novosti. p. 936. ISBN 5-88149-212-9.
- Efron, Ariadna; Federolf, Ada (2006). Непринудительные работы [Unforced labors: the memoirs of Ada Federolf and selected prose of Ariadna Efron.] (in Russian). Moskova: Vozvraščenije. p. 412. ISBN 5-7157-0201-1.
- Efron, Ariadna (2008). Аленькины вещи (in Russian). Moskova: Vozvraščenije. p. 42. ISBN 9785715701701.
- Efron, Ariadna (2008). Нить Ариадны (in Russian). Moskova: Dom-muzeĭ Mariny Cvetajevoĭ. p. 40. ISBN 978-5-93015-101-5.
- Efron, Ariadna; Federolf, Ada (2010). А жизнь идёт, как Енисей… Рядом с Алей (in Russian). Moskova: Vozvraščenije. p. 408. ISBN 978-5-7157-0234-0.
- Efron, Ariadna (2009). No Love Without Poetry: The Memoirs of Marina Tsvetaeva's Daughter (in Russian and English). Northwestern University Press. p. 224. ISBN 978-0-8101-2589-6.
- Efron, Ariadna (2013). Книга детства: Дневники Ариадны Эфрон, 1919–1921 (in Russian). Moskova: Russkiĭ put. ISBN 978-5-85887-435-5.
- Efron, Ariadna (2018). Нелитературная дружба: Письма к Лидии Бать. Предисловие Р. С. Войтеховича; примечания И. Г. Башкировой (PDF) (in Russian). Moskova: Sobranije. p. 360. Archived from the original (PDF) on 17 April 2019.

== Literature ==
- Jemel'janova, Irina Ivanovna (1997). Легенды Потаповского переулка: Б. Пастернак. А. Эфрон. В. Шаламов: Воспоминания и письма (in Russian). Moskova: Èllis Lak.
- Справочник Союза писателей СССР. ред. М. В. Горбачев, сост. Н. В. Боровская (in Russian). Moskova: Sovetskiĭ pisatel. 1970. p. 792.
