= Larisa Novoseltseva =

Russian singer-songwriter

Larisa Novoseltseva (Russian: Лариса Новосельцева) is a Russian singer-songwriter, composer, performer of Russian and Ukrainian folk songs and romances, and creator of project Return of the Silver Age. She is author of music and performer of songs and ballads on poems by more than forty Russian poets, mostly of the Silver Age, such as Osip Mandelstam, Nikolay Gumilev, Boris Pasternak, Marina Tsvetaeva, Maksimilian Voloshin, Konstantin Balmont, Alexander Vertinsky and many others, including Bella Akhmadulina who, according to Novoseltseva, can be viewed as the last poet of Silver Age based on her poetic language and style. Novoseltseva created more than 300 songs and published more than 20 music albums. She usually performs solo using guitar or piano for the accompaniment. More recently, she frequently appears with violinist Michael Czerwinski.

Novoseltseva considers music "the missing dimension of poetry". Together with her husband Sergei Novoseltsev, she runs the non-commercial educational project "Return of Silver Age". During the project she created more than 200 songs and 50 solo concerts, published 18 music albums, and organized club "Koktebel" that runs regular meetings to discuss Russian poetry, and made more than 150 appearances at events and gatherings in libraries, museums, art houses and clubs. The stated goal of the project is educating the public about Russian poetry of the Silver Age, after a 70-year ban or neglect during the Soviet period, and improving everyday Russian language using poetry.

== Selected discography ==
- Going after light, poetry by Osip Mandelshtam
- Do not leave me, my friend, Russian romance
- La Romance'25 – Vol 1 and Vol 2 – songs on poetry by different authors
- Candle, poetry by Akhmadulina and Tsvetaeva

== Concerts published on YouTube ==
- Songs of Russian emigration: part 1, Tsvetaeva, Turoverov, and Teffi Maria Petrovykh,
- Songs on poems by Bella Akhmadulina
- Silver Age Lullabies
