= Zlata Razdolina =

Russian composer and singer-songwriter

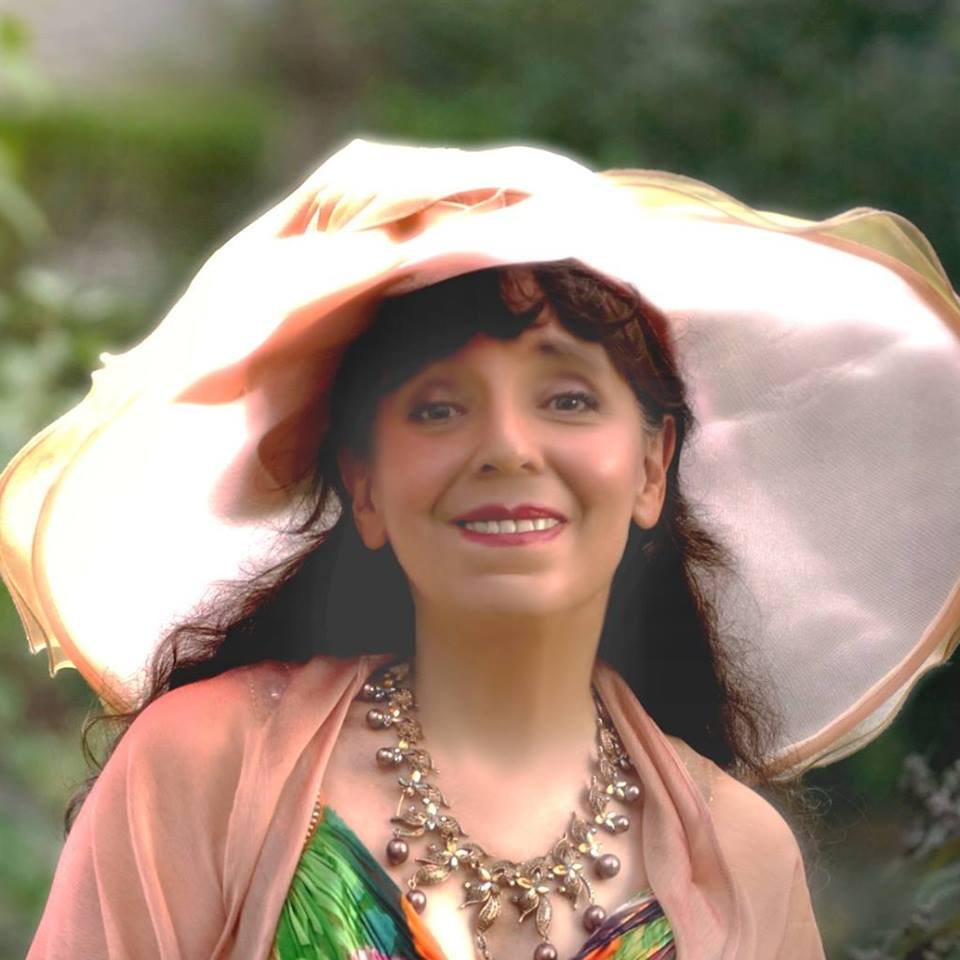
Zlata Razdolina

Zlata Razdolina (Rozenfeld, Russian: Злата Абрамовна Раздолина) is a Russian Jewish composer, singer-songwriter and music performer. She is best known as being the author of the music for Requiem by Anna Akhmatova, The Song of the Murdered Jewish People by Itzhak Katzenelson, and hundreds of romances and songs based on poems by Russian classical poets, including Anna Akhmatova, Nikolay Gumilyov, Marina Tsvetayeva and Igor Severyanin.

== Biography ==
Zlata Razdolina was born and obtained her musical education in Leningrad (St. Petersburg). She started playing piano at the age of four and wrote her first composition when she was five. By the age of 17, her music was recorded and played on the radio, and she was accepted to the Leningrad Union of Artists. She started her career by performing in the musical organization "Lenconcert".

She has received awards in many national and international music competitions. In 1988, she created the musical setting of Anna Akhmatova's poem "Requiem" which was later recognized as the best in an international competition. The "Requiem" was written for a symphony orchestra, choir and soloists. The composition was performed during the Anna Akhmatova centennial in the Kremlin in 1989, and later in Finland, Sweden, the Czech Republic, USA, and Israel.

After receiving wide acclaim for the "Requiem", she and her family became a target of threats and assaults by Russian nationalist organization Pamyat. Therefore, she decided to emigrate to Israel in 1990. In Israel, she performed together with singer Dudu Fisher on Israeli television.

In 1997, she set to music the poem The Song of the Murdered Jewish People by Itzhak Katzenelson, a well known Holocaust poet. Katzenelson was trapped in the Warsaw Ghetto, participated in the Warsaw Uprising, and was murdered in Auschwitz in 1944. The composition was completed in 1997 and designed for symphony orchestra, choir and a soloist to be performed in Hebrew.

== Discography ==
- The songs of the murdered Jewish people - CD (2008)
- Garden. Romances and songs on Marina Tsvetaevoj's verses (2008) - CD
- Pineapples in a champagne (2008) - CD
- The Neva water a drink - (2008) - CD
- It have buried in a sphere terrestrial... (2008) - CD
- REQUIEM and romances on Anna Ahmatovoj's verses, romances on Nikolay Gumileva's verses (2008) - CD
- That has been favorite... (2008) - CD

== Links ==
- Official website
- Youtube channel
- Vimeo channel
- Brief biography
- Her page on Akhmatova website
- Her page on Igor Severyanin website
