= Všenory =

- Municipality
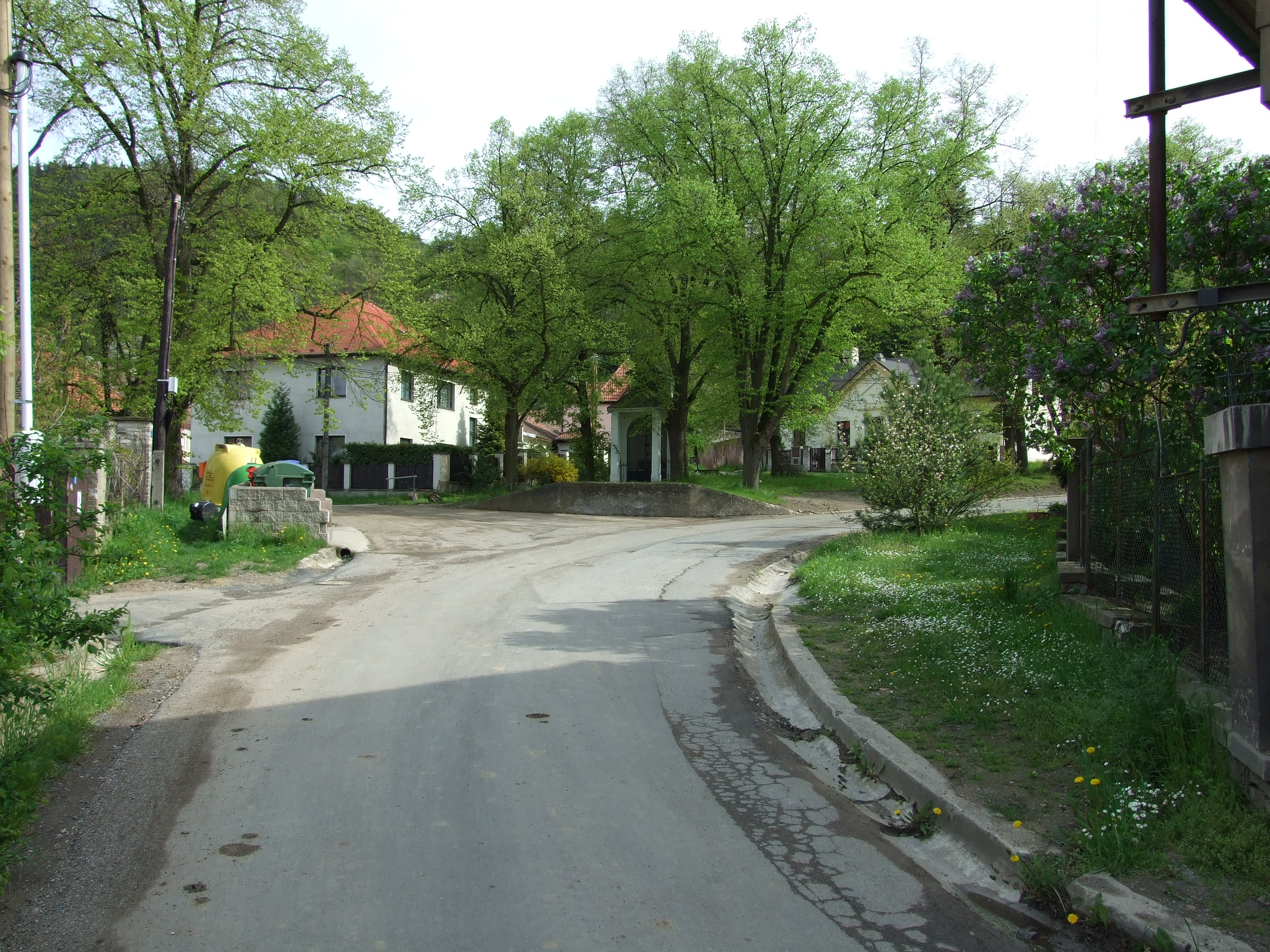
- Horní Mokropsy, local part of Všenory

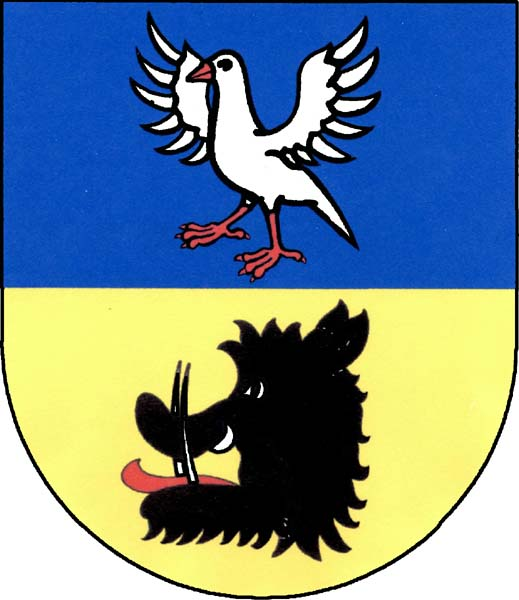
- Flag Coat of arms

- Location in the Czech Republic
- Coordinates: 49°55′44″N 14°18′14″E
- Country: Czech Republic
- Region: Central Bohemian
- District: Prague-West
- First mentioned: 1088

Area
  - Total: 3.54 km^{2} (1.37 sq mi)
- Elevation: 225 m (738 ft)

Population (2026-01-01)
  - Total: 1,778
  - Density: 502/km^{2} (1,300/sq mi)
- Time zone: UTC+1 (CET)
  - Summer (DST): UTC+2 (CEST)
- Postal code: 252 31
- Website: www.vsenory.cz

Všenory is a municipality and village in Prague-West District in the Central Bohemian Region of the Czech Republic. It has about 1,800 inhabitants.

== Demographics ==
Historical population
Year	Pop.	±%
1869	562	—
1880	629	+11.9%
1890	710	+12.9%
1900	738	+3.9%
1910	729	−1.2%
1921	914	+25.4%
1930	1,613	+76.5%
1950	1,620	+0.4%
1961	1,662	+2.6%
1970	1,671	+0.5%
1980	1,531	−8.4%
1991	1,357	−11.4%
2001	1,405	+3.5%
2011	1,596	+13.6%
2021	1,744	+9.3%
Source: Censuses

== Culture ==
For a period in the 1920s, Všenory was home to the Russian poet Marina Tsvetaeva. The municipality now hosts the Marina Tsvetaeva Centre, with an exhibition about her life and about 350 books related to her.
