= Higher Women's Courses =

Higher Women's Courses [ru] was a system of higher education in the Russian Empire.

Higher Women's Courses may individually refer to:

- Bestuzhev Courses
- Guerrier Courses
- Women's Higher Courses (Kyiv)
