= Moscow State University of Fine Chemical Technologies =

University in Moscow, Russia

Moscow State University of Fine Chemical Technologies named after Lomonosov
- Московский государственный университет тонких химических технологий имени М. В. Ломоносова
- Type: Public
- Established: 1900
- Location: Moscow, Russia; 55°39′43″N 37°28′37″E
- Website: www.mitht.ru

Moscow State University of Fine Chemical Technologies named after M.V. Lomonosov (traditional abbreviation "MITHT") is one of the oldest universities in the country that offer training in a wide range of specialties in the field of chemical technology.

Currently, there are more than 4,500 students in nine areas of undergraduate, 28 master's programs and 23 scientific specialties for training of candidates and doctors of science. In MITHT there are eight dissertation councils for doctoral and PhD theses.

Research and teaching activities are performed by more than 400 professors and 158 scientists, including more than 120 doctors of science and professors. Located in Moscow at Vernadsky Avenue, Building 86 (new building complex) and Malaya Pirogovskaya, Building 1 (historic building).

== History ==
History of the university and its continuing operations as a higher education institution begins 1 July 1900 and covers several stages.

=== Physics and Mathematics Faculty of Moscow Higher Women Courses (1900–1918) ===
1 July (14 July, New Style) 1900 was organized the Moscow Higher Women Courses (MHWC). Their structure originally consisted of two departments: History and Philosophy and Physics and Mathematics. On the last one were soon opened two offices: mathematical and natural, and after a few years two more – medical and chemical-pharmaceutical. The initiators and the first lecturers were outstanding scientists, academics subsequently S. A. Chaplygin, V. I. Vernadsky, N. D. Zelinsky (the inventor of the gas mask (1916)), Professors V. F. Davidov, B. K. Mlodzeevskii, A. N. Reformatsky, A. A. Eichenwald, S. G. Krapivin. The first director of MHWC was Professor V. I. Guerrier.

In 1905 as a director was elected S. A. Chaplygin, the leading scientist in the field of hydro- and aerodynamics, the organizer of the construction of school buildings on the Malaya Pirogovskaya street (formerly Devichie Pole). He remained in that post until 1918.

By the beginning of World War I MHWC turned into one of the largest higher education institutions in the country. The number of trainees reached 710, and released 5760 professionals. In turning into a first-class university. MHWC had an exceptional organizational skill of S. A. Chaplygin, later shown to them with equal brilliance in creating TsAGI.

=== Department of Chemistry of the 2nd Moscow State University (1918–30) ===
16 October 1918 MHWC were converted into second Moscow State University. The first rector of the 2nd Moscow State University was appointed academician S. S. Nametkin who worked since 1913 as a head of the Department of Organic Chemistry of MHWC. As rector, he remained until 1924. As part of the 2nd Moscow State University became the chemical-pharmaceutical department, which in 1919 was transformed into the chemical and pharmaceutical department. At this time, on the faculty worked well-known Professors A. M. Berkengeim, B. K. Mlodzeevskii, S. S. Nametkin, M. I. Prozin, A. N. Reformatsky, O. N. Tsuberbiller. In 1929, the faculty became a chemical faculty of the university type with specialties such as:

- Chemical – pharmaceutical chemistry;
- Basic chemistry;
- Aniline chemistry;
- Chemistry of rare elements;
- Coke-benzene chemistry;
- Organic Synthesis.

Faculty graduates go to work in the factories, involve in the implementation of research projects that receive a wide scope. During 1922 – 1928 years it has been published about 300 papers and 11 monographs. The greatest successes are achieved in the fields of organic and pharmaceutical chemistry under the direction of heads of departments, academics S. S. Nametkin, B. M. Rodionov, Professor A. M. Berkengeim. Production of new drugs being introduced in the pharmaceutical factory belonging to faculty.

=== Moscow Institute of Fine Chemical Technology (1930–92) ===
18 April 1930 by order of the People's Commissariat second MSU was reorganized into three independent institutions: Medical (now RSMU them. Pirogov) Pedagogical (now MPSU), and Chemical Technology (now MITHT). Last transferred to the jurisdiction of the Vsehimprom VSNKh USSR. In addressing this issue directly involved Sergo Ordzhonikidze.

10 May 1931 Chemical and Pharmaceutical Faculty became an independent and received a new name – the Moscow Institute of Fine Chemical Technology (MITHT). Historically, the name of the institute is due to the nature of objects that are studied by students: they were small capacity chemical and pharmaceutical technology, technology of platinum group metals and rare-earth elements. From this moment begins a new stage of development of the institution, which is quickly becoming one of the leading universities in the chemical industry. Front of it set the goal of training for high-tech industries of chemical technology. In MITHT the first time in the country began to train engineers on the technology of thin inorganic products, synthetic rubber, thin organic produce synthetic liquid fuels, organometallic compounds and a number of other specialties.

During the educational restructuring of the institute, the best traditions of MHWC and 2nd Moscow State University have been preserved. These include a high level of theoretical training and a combination of academic and scientific work, helped by the fact that the teaching work at the institute and chairing of departments were performed by scientists and educators which created a school and research areas.

Special departments were prepared engineers for industries which were still being created in the first five years. At the time, were of great importance establishment of a domestic pharmaceutical industry and the country's liberation on imports of medicines. Were developed and implemented methods of production of such drugs as atophan, benzocaine, procaine, bromural, thiokol, ichtyol, validol, antipyrine, caffeine, alkaloids and others. In 1938, in MITHT under the leadership of academic A. N. Nesmeyanov (later President of the RAS) began work in the field of organometallic compounds. Also, the Institute prepared professionals for the companies producing such important national defense materials, such as tungsten, molybdenum, vanadium, and rare-earth elements. So, Professor I. Ya. Bashilov created the production technology of uranium and radium. And under the guidance of Professor G. A. Meyerson were carried out important work on carbothermy and getting super-hard alloys.

7 May 1940 for academic achievement and great progress in the preparation of chemists institute is named after the outstanding Russian scientist Mikhail Vasilievich Lomonosov.

During the war, groups of departments in collaboration with industry and research institutes conduct intensive research on defense-related development and implementation of the executed work. Thus, under the supervision of Professor N. I. Gelperin was created the most powerful bomb in World War II – FAB-5000NG that terrified Hitlerites. Efforts of the Institute as a whole and individual professors and teachers were appreciated by the country. Professors B. A. Dogadkin, N. I. Krasnopevtsev, V. V. Lebedinskij, S. S. Medvedev, S. I. Sklyarenko and Ya. K. Sirkin were awarded the Stalin Prize laureates, and associate professor K. A. Bolshakov won that title twice.

The post-war period was characterized by intensive work of the Institute staff in the aftermath of the war, the creation of the necessary conditions for teaching and research. Among the most important achievements of the postwar period MITHT need to include:

- The total synthesis of a number of natural alkaloids – pilocarpine, pilozinin, alkaloids of propane series (tropine, cocaine), arecoline, eserine, emetine, psyhotrine, emataliine, cinchonamine, tubocurarine and other alkaloids of curare (magnolin, magnolamine, dauricine). For this work, Professor N. A. Preobragensky in 1952 was awarded the Stalin Prize of the first degree;
- The synthesis of physiologically active derivatives of piperidine (anesthetics, analgesics, and other drugs), technology development and industrial development of high-output painkiller "promedol";
- Academician A. N. Bashkirov for the first time in the world and the Soviet Union in 1959 has been implemented industrial technology for production of higher aliphatic alcohols on the basis of a synthesis of hydrogen and carbon monoxide (the so-called "oxosynthesis technology");
- Development of technology for the production of vitamins A_{1}, B_{1}, B_{2}, E, C and K_{1};
- Create rubbers based on new types of caoutchouc, operating at high and low temperatures in harsh operating conditions.

The high scientific – technical research conducted at the institute, evidenced by the fact that MITHT became one of the first places among the universities and research institutes on the number of implemented inventions. Employees of the institute published 450–500 scientific papers and received 50–60 invention certificates a year. The institute conducts research on economic agreements and contracts on cooperation with industry and research institutes, whose number exceeded 150.

MITHT developed into a complex of the university and research institutes. With 2500–3000 students and 400 professors and lecturers, the university employed more than 900 scientists. At MITHT, the ratio of students to academic and teaching staff reached 2:1. A good specialist, engineer cannot be prepared without participating in real, serious scientific research in the learning process.

11 February 1971 for his services to the training of specialists for the national economy and the development of scientific research institute was awarded the Order of the Red Banner of Labour.

Education in MITHT featured fundamental training, which included a full range of natural sciences, big cycle engineering, and technological disciplines. Special training was carried out by the so-called "thin" chemical technologies that are, as a rule, small capacity technology, implemented on the basis of the latest achievements of chemical science and technology. The students also received a university degree in combination with engineering training.

=== Moscow State Academy of Fine Chemical Technology named after M. V. Lomonosov (1992–2011) ===
In 1992, the Moscow Institute of Fine Chemical Technology named after M. V. Lomonosov has received a new, higher educational status – status of the academy. With the name change has changed the status and range of activities of the institute along with old technology, new specialty Humanitarian – Management Profile: "Economics and Management (chemical industry)", "Environmental Protection", "Standardization and Certification". These specialties are subject to major technologies and solve their narrow-profile tasks.

Before the transition to a tiered structure the education of students was carried out in one direction, "Chemical Technology and Biotechnology", which consists of seven specialties. After the transition academy led training in seven areas of undergraduate, graduate five areas (including 26 master's programs) and 13 majors (including 25 majors) in full-time and part-correspondence courses, and conducted post-graduate education in 24 specialties and additional education in primary educational programs MITHT.

To implement in MITHT a tiered system of higher education were opened new training units. Along with main faculties teaching of students was performed at the Faculty of Natural Science, Faculty of Humanities, Faculty of Management, Economics and Environment, Faculty of Engineering, Faculty of further education at the Institute of Distance Education.

According to the Federal Agency for Supervision in Education and Science in 2008 in MITHT worked one of the most highly qualified scientific and technical teaching staff of universities and academies of Russia: doctors and candidates of sciences accounted for about 80% of the teachers. At the academy a total enrollment of 4,500 undergraduate and graduate students, taught 119 professors, doctors, and 218 associate professors, candidates of sciences.

=== Moscow State University of Fine Chemical Technologies (2011–present) ===
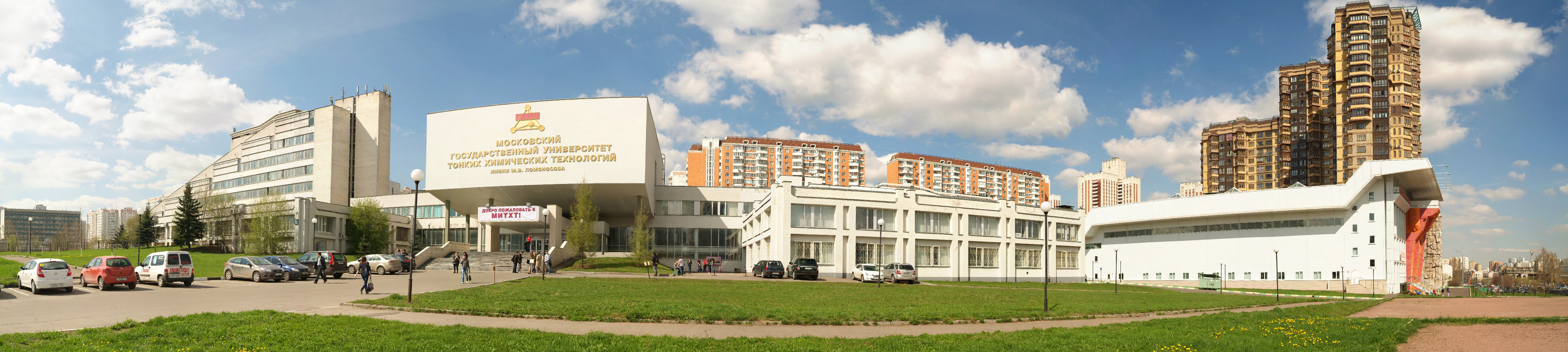
Panorama of MITHT main building on Vernadsky Prospect in Moscow

In 2011, the academy received a university status.

The university gained its international status because it stands out in the fields of education, research and innovation as well as the recognition of the scientific and pedagogical schools, its international status.

== Awards ==
- In accordance with the Decree of the Presidium of the Supreme Soviet of USSR on 20 October 1956 the Moscow Institute of Fine Chemical Technology named after M. V. Lomonosov awarded the medal "For the development of virgin land";
- In accordance with the Decree of the Presidium of the Supreme Soviet of USSR on 11 February 1971 for services on the training of specialists for the national economy and the development of research Moscow Institute of Fine Chemical Technology named after M. V. Lomonosov awarded the Order of Red Banner of Labour.

== Faculties and institutes ==
- Faculty of Humanities
- Faculty of Management, Economics and Ecology
- Faculty of Natural Sciences
- Faculty of Engineering
- Faculty of Chemistry and Technology of Rare Elements and electronic materials
- Faculty of Biotechnology and Organic synthesis
- Faculty of Physics, Chemistry and Technology of Polymer Processing
- Faculty of Additional Education
- Institute of Polymer Technologies and Materials
- The State Institute of Professional Development and Retraining chemical, microbiological and medical industry
- Institute of Distance Education

== Areas of baccalaureate ==
- Chemistry
- Chemical technology
- Biotechnology
- Material Science and Technology of Materials
- Standardization and Certification
- Technosphere Safety
- Applied Informatics
- Applied mathematics
- Management

== Masters Programs ==
Chemistry:

- Inorganic chemistry
- Analytical chemistry
- Organic chemistry
- Physical chemistry
- Colloid chemistry

Chemical technology:

- Chemistry and Technology of basic organic and petrochemical synthesis
- Chemistry and Technology of organometallic compounds
- Chemical technology of natural energy and carbon materials
- Chemical Technology of Macromolecular Compounds
- Chemical technology of plastics and composite materials
- Technology for processing of elastomers
- Nanotechnology of organic photosensitive materials
- Processes and devices of chemical technologies
- Information Systems in Chemical Engineering and Biotechnology
- Chemical technology of fuel and gas
- Theoretical Foundations of Chemical Engineering

Biotechnology:

- Molecular and Cellular Biotechnology
- Chemistry and Technology of biologically active substances
- Technology of drugs
- Technology of biopharmaceuticals Moscow State University of Fine Chemical Technologies
- Technology of bioconversion of plant material

Materials science and technology of materials:

- Materials science and technology of nanomaterials and coatings
- Material science, the receipt and processing of inorganic powder and composite materials
- Theoretical and Applied Polymer Materials
- Physico-chemical studies of new materials and processes
- Physical materials and technology of electronic materials

Technosphere Safety:

- Protecting the environment

Standardization and Certification:

- Total Quality Management

== Famous alumni ==
=== Science ===
- Abisheva, Zinesh (23 January 1947, Terenozek, Kyzylorda, Kazakh Soviet Socialist Republic – 13 May 2021, Almaty, Kazakhstan) – metallurgist, chemical engineer, civil servant and educator. She developed new technologies for the extraction of gallium, osmium, and rhenium and developed processing technologies.
- Beregov, Valery Vasilievich (b. 27 February 1942) – Corresponding Member of RAMS, now head of the department in MSMU them. Sechenov.
- Wolfson, Nicholai Sigizmundovich (18 October 1914, Moscow, Russian Empire – 4 March 1994) – a Russian chemist who developed methods for the synthesis of vitamin A, P, K and chemicals color cinematography.
- Gekhman, Alexander Efimovich (b. 29 September 1949, Moscow) – Corresponding Member of the Russian Academy of Sciences.
- Glushkov, Robert Georgievich (b. 10 September 1929) – Academy of Medical Sciences, the leading scientist in the field of chemistry of drugs, laureate of the State Prize of the USSR (1981).
- Dumaev, Cyril Michailovich (b. 1931) – Corresponding Member of the Russian Academy of Sciences.
- Evstigneeva, Rima Porfirievna (12 February 1925, Egorevsk – 7 July 2003, Moscow) – a member of the USSR Academy of Sciences, an expert in the chemistry of natural compounds, the winner of the State Prize of the USSR (1985). Developed the technology of synthesis of vitamins E and K1.
- Eremenko, Igor Leonidovich (b. 1950) – Academician of Russian Academy of Sciences.
- Karabash, Alex Georgievich. (10 February 1912 – 2003, Obninsk, Kaluga region, Russia) – Soviet and Russian chemist, inventor. One of the founders of the first Soviet atomic bomb RDS-1 and the world's first nuclear power plant in Obninsk.
- Kolosov, Michael Nicholaevich. (11 May 1927, Kursk – 1985, Moscow) – Academician of the Academy of Sciences of the USSR. Apprentice of M.M. Shemyakin.
- Kochetkov, Nicholai Konstantinovich (1915–2005) – Russian organic chemist, a corresponding member of the USSR Academy of Medical Sciences, Academician of Russian Academy of Sciences.
- Krajewski, Alexander Antonovich (b. 1932) – Academician of Russian Academy of Sciences.
- Lapidus, Albert Lvovich (b. 1933) – Corresponding Member of the Russian Academy of Sciences.
- Mirzabeckov, Andrew Daryevitch (19 October 1937 – 13 July 2003) – Director of the Institute of Molecular Biology, Academy of Sciences of the USSR from 1984 to 2003, Doctor of Chemical Sciences, USSR Academy of Sciences (RAS).
- Miroschnikov, Anatoly Ivanovich (b. 5 May 1940, v. Sagaidachniy Belgorod Region) – Academician of Russian Academy of Sciences, Member of the Presidium of the Russian Academy of Sciences – a prominent specialist in the field of biotechnology and technology of natural and synthetic compounds, and bioorganic chemistry. From 1987 to 1991 Director of the All-Union Scientific Research Institute of Medicinal Plants (AIMP), from 1991 vice director of the Institute of Bioorganic Chemistry of RAS, Chairman of the Presidium of Pushchino Research Center of RAS.
- Moiseev, Ilya Josephovich (19 October 1937 – 13 July 2003) – Academician.
- Moiseenkov, Alexander Kravchuk (1935–1992) – Corresponding Member of the Russian Academy of Sciences. Laureate of the State Prize of the Russian Federation (1998).
- Muzafarov, Aziz Mansurovich (b. 21 August 1950, Fergana) – Corresponding Member of the Russian Academy of Sciences.
- Nefedov, Vadim Ivanovich (b. 29 June 1937, Magnitogorsk) – Academician, laureate of the State Prize of the USSR (1985).
- Pravednikov Andrew Nikodimovich (1923–1985) – Member of the Academy of Sciences of the USSR.
- Sakharov, Boris Andreevich (28 March 1914, St. Petersburg – 12 April 1973, Moscow) – a member of the Academy of Sciences of the USSR. Lenin Prize (1964) and the State Prize of the USSR (1985). Master of Sports of the USSR (1968) and International Arbiter (1956) on chess composition, Vice President of the Permanent Commission of the FIDE Chess Composition (1965–1972).
- Solncev, Konstantin (b. 29 March 1950, v. Panino Voronezh Region) – Academician of Russian Academy of Sciences, director of Institute of Physical and Chemical Problems of ceramic materials.
- Fedorenko, Nikolay Prokofievich (11 May 1917 – 1 April 2006) – Academician of Academy of Sciences of the USSR, one of the founders and first director of CEMI, Academy of Sciences of the USSR (1963–1985)
- Khokhlov, Alexander Stepanovich (b. 6 July 1916, Moscow – 9 July 1997) – Academician of Russian Academy of Sciences.
- Cetlin, Victor Ionovich (b. 2 October 1941) – Corresponding Member of the Russian Academy of Sciences.
- Shvets, Vitaly Ivanovich(b. 19 March 1936, Nikopol) – Academician of Russian Academy of Sciences – a famous scientist in the development of methods for the isolation, chemical and biological synthesis of various types of lipids and their complexes with a variety of biologically active substances, the winner of the State Prize of the USSR (1985), winner of the Award of the Government of the Russian Federation in the field of education, Honored worker of Science, Head of the Department of Biotechnology and bionanotechnology of MITHT.

=== Politics ===
- Tikhomirov, Sergey Michailovich (1 (14) February 1905 – 25 November 1982) – Soviet political and economic figure. Member of the CPSU Central Committee (1956–1961).
- Furtseva, Catherine Alekseevna (24 November (7 December), 1910, Vishny Volochek – 25 October 1974, Moscow) – Soviet statesman and party leader. The Minister of Culture of the USSR from 1960 to 1974.

=== Industry ===
- Smirnov, Alex Sergeevich (b. 9 June 1963) – Russian businessman. Since 2005 – Vice president of JSC "Lukoil".
- Filatov, Anatoly Vasilievich (b. 28 May 1935) – the Russian metallurgist, the first general manager of the concern "Norilsk Nickel" (1989–1996). Federation Council member of I convocation (1993–1996). Hero of Socialist Labor.

=== Sport ===
- Zharkova, Olga Nicholaevna (b. 11 January 1979, Moscow) – Russian curler, member of two Olympic Games (2002 and 2006), European champion in 2006.

== See also ==
- Moscow State Pedagogical University (Second Moscow State University)
- Russian National Research Medical University named after N.I. Pirogov

== Literature ==
- R. R. Biglov Essays on the History of MITHT. – Moscow: Publishing center MITHT them. M.V. Lomonosov, 2010. – 171 p. – ISBN 978-5-904742-02-7
- Moscow Academy of Fine Chemical Technology, Golden Pages of MITHT – Moscow: Publishing House "Provincial", 2010. – 148 p. – ISBN 978-5-98266-067-1
