= Pavel Sergeyev =

Pavel Sergeyev may refer to:

- Pavel Sergeyev (footballer) (born 1993) or Pavel Aleksandrovich Sergeyev, Russian football midfielder
- Pavel Vasilyevich Sergeyev (1931–2007), Soviet Russian pharmacologist
