= Guerrier Courses =

Women's university in Moscow, Russia (1872–1918)

Coordinates: 55°43′57″N 37°34′35″E

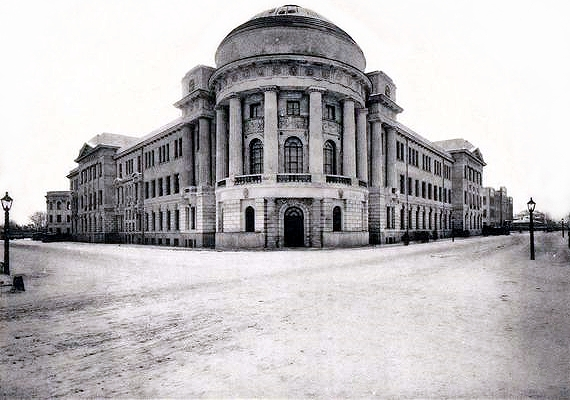
The main building of the Higher Courses for Women (built in 1909–1913)

The Higher Courses for Women in Moscow (Russian: Московские высшие женские курсы, romanized: Moskovskiye Vysshiye Zhenskiye Kursy, lit. 'Moscow Higher Women's Courses') was a university for women between 1872 and 1918 (with a break in 1888–1900), after which they were transformed into the 2nd Moscow State University. It was one of the largest and most prominent women's higher education institutions in the Russian Empire, second only to the Bestuzhev Courses in Saint Petersburg. It was founded and administered by Vladimir I. Guerrier.

== Historical information ==
=== First period (1872–1888) ===
At the beginning of 1871, the supernumerary professor of general history of Moscow University, V.I. Guerrier, sent a note to the trustee of the Moscow educational district, Prince A.P. Shirinsky-Shikhmatov, about the advisability of opening higher women's courses in Moscow, to which he added the draft "Regulations on Higher Women's Courses", in which he outlined the purpose and program of the created courses. Guerrier persuaded the Minister of Public Education Count Dmitry A. Tolstoy to sanction a higher school for women in Moscow. In May 1872, the Minister of Public Education, Count D. A. Tolstoy, agreed to the opening of higher women's courses in Moscow as a private educational institution and approved the "Regulations on Higher Women's Courses".

On November 1, 1872, at Volkhonka 16, in the building of the First Men's Gymnasium, the grand opening of the Moscow Higher Women's Courses (courses of Professor V. I. Guerrier) took place, where professors of the Imperial Moscow University, priest A. M. Ivantsov–Platonov, S. M. Solovyov spoke and V. I. Guerriere.

The course budget consisted of tuition fees and voluntary donations. The first donations came from Guerrier's wife Evdokia Ivanovna, her aunt E. K. Stankevich (500 rubles annually) and K. T. Soldatenkov (100 rubles annually). 13% of the sources of income for the courses were dividends from bonds purchased by Guerrier with a portion of the income from the activities of the courses. In addition, additionally (1%) the course participants collected money to purchase books for the course library. To replenish the course budget, Guerrier staged charity performances at the Solodovnikov Theatre. For income from performances in 1883, 46 listeners were given allowances. In addition, funds were sought through the sale of books and postcards printed in their own printing house.

Initially, training was designed for 2 years, and since 1879, according to the new Charter, 3 years. The Moscow courses had a historical and philological orientation, the compulsory subjects were approved: the history of Russia and general history, Russian literature and general literature, the history of civilization and the history of art, physics. For those who wished, it was supposed to teach foreign languages, mathematics and hygiene. Classes were paid: 30 rubles a year were paid for the entire course of a student, and 10 rubles a year for a separate subject–volunteers. In 1875, the fee was 50 rubles a year; then – 100 rubles a year. In the total volume of incoming financial resources, tuition fees amounted to more than 75%; part of the funds (up to 7%) were voluntary donations; from 1875 to 1882 Moscow Merchant Administration allocated 500 rubles a year for 10 scholarships.

In 1872–1873, the courses were located on Volkhonka in downtown Moscow, in 1873–1876 – in the premises of the Museum of Applied Knowledge on Prechistenka 32, and in 1877–1888 – in a building specially built for the Polytechnic Museum.

Regular students had to provide a certificate of secondary education upon entry or pass entrance exams in Russian and general history, Russian and general literature. The listeners also submitted an autobiography, a certificate of moral conduct and political integrity from the governor general, two photographs and, without fail, permission from the eldest man in the family or spouse.

The number of students in the courses at that time was quite high: in the first year after the opening of the courses, it reached 70 (most of the students moved from the Lubensky courses), then until 1878 it fluctuated between 103–107, and from 1879 the number of students gradually increased, reaching 256 in the 1884/85 academic year.

In 1881, a new humanitarian discipline was introduced in the courses – the history of philosophy.

Lectures at the courses were given by well-known professors of Moscow University (it was specifically stipulated in the Charter that mainly university professors would be invited as teachers). Among the first teachers were: Professor Fyodor A. Bredikhin (physics, astronomy), Professor Alexander N. Veselovsky (Russian literature), Professor Pavel G. Vinogradov (History of the Middle Ages), Professor Vasily O. Klyuchevsky (Russian history), Rector of Moscow University, Professor Vladimir S. Solovyov (history of philosophy), L. M. Lopatin (history of philosophy), Vladimir I. Guerrier (history), Professor Nikolay I. Storozhenko (general literature), Professor N. S. Tikhonravov (ancient Russian literature), Fyodor I. Buslayev (art history). Since 1877, the history of the Russian language and ancient Russian literature was taught by V. F. Miller . Later, Aleksandr I. Chuprov (political economy), Aleksandr G. Stoletov (physics), and Professor A. A. Shakhov (history of foreign literature).

The work of the courses was supervised by the Pedagogical Council, headed by Professor Sergey M. Solovyov. The trustee committee of the courses included E. K. Stankevich (nee - Bodisko (1824–1904), wife of A. V. Stankevich ), Kozma T. Soldatyonkov, E. I. Guerrier.

For 16 years, the courses issued 41 diplomas, which gave the right to teach in the senior classes of women's gymnasiums, in addition, 322 students passed the final exams, which gave them the right to teach in the junior classes of gymnasiums.

In 1886, the Ministry of Public Education, represented by Minister I.D. Delyanov, forbade admission to all higher women's courses, motivating this measure by the need to develop new curricula and transfer courses to state support and in 1888 they have been closed.

The feeble-minded people who ruled in the 80s believed that they had won a great success over the revolution by forbidding the admission of girls to the Higher Women's Courses. But ten years later, they themselves were convinced of their mistake and began to think about restoring courses.

— V.I. Guerrier

Like its Saint Petersburg counterpart, the Guerrier Courses was established to prevent Russian women from studying abroad, which they had done since the universities were closed to women in Russia in 1863. The courses provided university level education, but in contrast to the courses for men, they were not allowed to issue any formal degree, nor were they given government funding. They were closed in 1888 but opened again in 1900.

=== Second period (1900–1918) ===
In 1900, graduates of secondary educational institutions from 41 provinces entered the courses. The new courses were no longer a private institution, receiving part of the funds from the Ministry of Public Education.

The term of study in courses in 1900 increased to four years. The newly opened courses had two departments – historical-philosophical and physical-mathematical. In 1906, according to the new Charter, the faculty structure of the Courses was established. In addition to the two existing ones, a Medical Faculty was opened (now the Russian National Research Medical University named after N.I. Pirogov ), which made the structure of the courses close to the structure of a classical university (before the revolution, universities in Russia, as a rule, consisted of four faculties: historical – philological, physical and mathematical, medical and legal). Since 1911, the Bakhrushinskaya Hospital has become the clinical base of the Medical Faculty. In the 1906–1907 academic year, the subject cycle system of teaching was introduced in the courses instead of the course system with specialization in the senior year. New curricula were also approved at all faculties. 15 hours a week were allotted for the study of compulsory subjects.

Until 1905, V. I. Guerrier was again the director of the courses. In 1905, in the absence of V. I. Guerrier, who was abroad, Vladimir I. Vernadsky was elected director. However, due to the fact that Vernadsky was simultaneously elected assistant rector of the Imperial Moscow University, he never took up his duties in the Courses. In the same year, Sergey A. Chaplygin was elected director of courses.

The courses were taught by such outstanding scientists as Vladimir I. Vernadsky (with his student V. V. Karandeev ), Sergey A. Chaplygin, Sergey S. Nametkin, Nikolay D. Zelinsky, Alexander A. Eichenwald, Boleslav K. Mlodzeevskii, Aleksandr N. Reformatsky, Ivan A. Ilyin, Alexander V. Zinger, Bogdan A. Kistyakovski and others. One of the first women professors was Olga N. Tsuberbiller, a graduate of courses, the author of the textbook on Analytic Geometry, "Problems and Exercises in Analytic Geometry", which was reprinted many times.

Since 1910, Professor N. D. Vinogradov began to read a course in the history of pedagogical teachings .

In 1905, the Moscow City Council decided to provide courses free of charge with a land plot on Devichye Pole . On June 3, 1907, the laying of educational buildings took place (architect S. U. Solovyov ) on a land plot along Malaya Tsaritsynskaya Street (now Malaya Pirogovskaya street). In 1908, the buildings of the Faculty of Physics and Chemistry ( now part of Moscow State University of Fine Chemical Technologies) and the Anatomical Theater (architect A. N. Sokolov) (nowadays part of Russian National Research Medical University ) were opened on Trubetskoy Lane (now Kholzunova Lane ), and in 1913, the Auditorium Building of the Courses (now the main building of the Moscow Pedagogical State University, it is depicted on the current emblem of the Moscow State Pedagogical University.).

1911 became a milestone in the life of the Moscow Higher Women's Courses. In connection with the outbreak of a conflict between the Imperial Moscow University and the Minister of Public Education Lev A. Kasso (named Kasso Case ), a large group of professors and teachers left the university, most of whom began to work at the Courses. By 1912, 227 professors, teachers, lecturers and assistants were involved in the courses, more than a third of whom had doctoral or master's degrees; among them: former rector of Moscow University Alexander A. Manuilov, astronomer Pavel K. Shternberg, mathematician Nikolay A. Izvolsky, biologists Mikhail A. Menzbier and Nikolai K. Koltsov, physiologists Mikhail N. Shaternikov and Lazar S. Minor, philosophers Leo M. Lopatin, Pavel I. Novgorodtsev, historians Matvei K. Lyubavsky, Yury V. Gotye, Ivan V. Tsvetaev. Alexandre A. Kiesewetter, sociologist Veniamin M. Khvostov, biologist Lev A.Tarassevitch, historian of philosophy Alexander V. Kubitsky. There were also women among the staff of the courses: Maria Egorovna Becker, assistant to the course inspector; Olga Aleksandrovna Alferova, librarian; Nina Evgenievna Vedeneeva, assistant of the Department of Inorganic Chemistry (1914) and the Department of Physics (1916).

In 1911, women were finally accepted at the Russian universities.

In 1912, Courses graduates for the first time received the right to take exams at the Imperial Moscow University. On November 17, 1912, the Council of Courses approved the “Regulations on leaving students at the Moscow Higher Women's Courses”, which allows leaving graduates at the faculty to prepare them for teaching on the proposal of a professor (professors) for 2 years.

In 1913, Aleksandr F. Kots ' zoological collection was acquired for Courses, which laid the foundation for the Darwin Museum.

In the 1915–1916 academic year, the Moscow Higher Women's Courses were granted the right to conduct final exams and issue diplomas of higher education. By 1918, the courses numbered 8.3 thousand students, second only to Moscow State University .

On the initiative of former students, the "Society for the Delivery of Funds to Moscow Higher Women's Courses" was established.

During 1900–1913 the number of female students increased from 223 to 7155. However, the annual graduation was no more than 30% of the number of applicants, which was due to the inability of the students to withstand heavy teaching loads and most of the time to study on their own. Courses became one of the largest universities in the Russian Empire.

According to the protocol of the commission of the People's Commissariat of Education of the RSFSR dated October 16, 1918, the Moscow Higher Women's Courses was transformed into the 2nd Moscow State University (later split into several institutions, including the Moscow State Pedagogical University).

== Notable Alumnae ==
- Olga Dmitrievna Bagalei-Tatarinova, Ukrainian historian, archivist, bibliographer and librarian
- Maria Chekhova, Russian teacher and artist
- Alexandra Glagoleva-Arkadieva, Russian physicist
- Zinaida Ivanova, Russian feminist author and translator
- Ekaterina Kletnova, Russian archaeologist, ethnographer and writer
- Nadezhda Ladygina-Kohts, Russian comparative psychologist
- Lidija Liepiņa, Latvian physical chemist.
- Srbui Lisitsian, Armenian ethnographer
- Anna Missuna, Polish geologist, mineralogist, and paleontologist
- Lidia Mizinova, Russian actress, writer and translator
- Vera Mouromtseva-Bounina, Russian-French translator and writer
- Vera Stepanovna Nechayeva, writer and biographer
- Nadezhda Nikolaevna Sushkina, Russian soil scientist and microbiologist
- Bella Rosenfeld, Russian writer
- Marija Rudzinskaitė-Arcimavičienė, Lithuanian Orientalist, Egyptologist and educator
- Olga Tsuberbiller, Russian mathematician
- Vera Varsanofieva, Russian geologist and geomorphologist

== See also ==
- Bestuzhev Courses
- Women's Higher Courses (Kyiv)
- Russian National Research Medical University
- Moscow State Pedagogical University
- Moscow State University of Fine Chemical Technologies
