= Alexey Severtsev =

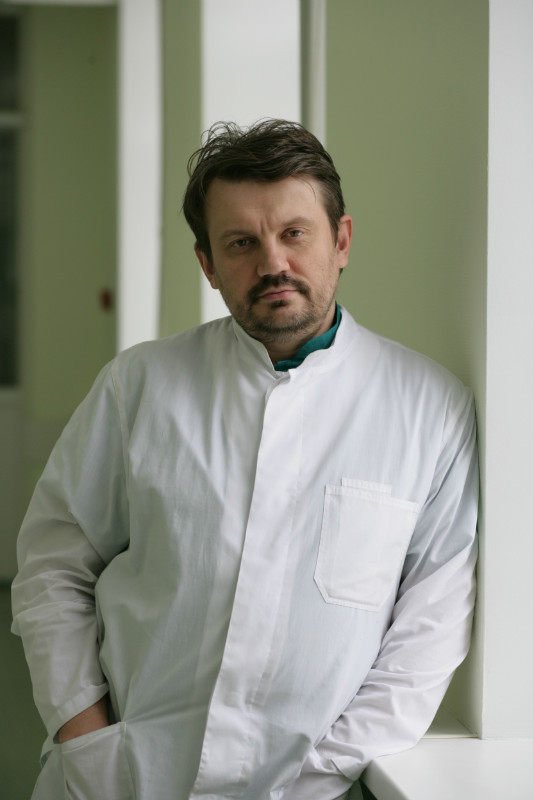
- Born: 4 October 1961; Moscow
- Education: I.M. Sechenov First Moscow State Medical University
- Scientific career
- Fields: Surgery and Oncology
- Workplaces: Russian National Research Medical University

Alexey Nikolaevich Severtsev (Russian: Алексей Николаевич Северцев; born October 4, 1961, in Moscow) is a Russian doctor of medicine sciences, professor in the hospital surgery department of the medical faculty in Pirogov Russian National Research Medical University and the chief surgeon of a chain of clinics “MEDSI”.

== Biography ==
- 1961 – Born in Moscow;
- 1984 – Graduation with honors from I.M. Sechenov First Moscow State Medical University;
- 1989 – Candidate of Medical Sciences (surgery), PhD;
- 1991-1992 – Visiting professor in the University of California, Los Angeles (UCLA);
- 1993 – Surgeon in the King Faisal Specialist Hospital and Research Centre (Riyadh, the Kingdom of Saudi Arabia);
- 1998-2002 – The head of the surgical department in the Clinical Hospital No.1 of the Medical Centre UD of the President of the Russian Federation;
- 2001 – Becoming a doctor of Medical Sciences (surgery);
- 2002-2010 – The chief surgeon of the hospital and the head of department of hepato-pancreato-biliary surgery in the Central Clinical Hospital No.1 of JSC “Russian Railways”;
- 2003-until now – A professor of hospital surgery department of medical faculty in Pirogov Russian National Research Medical University;
- 2005 – Becoming a professor (surgery);
- 2010 - until now – the chief surgeon of a chain of clinics “MEDSI”.

== Professional interests ==
- transplantation of pancreatic islets in severe forms of diabetes (tissue transplantation);
- acute pancreatitis and pancreatonecrosis;
- severe surgical sepsis;
- various forms of hepatitis, including infectious;
- pancreatic cancer;
- pancreatic-duodenal resection;
- liver cancer;
- international clinical trials in surgery, oncology, gastroenterology, infectious diseases;
- cancer and precancerous lesions of the esophagus;
- rare and tumor diseases of biliary (including extrahepatic) ways: Klatzkin tumor, strictures of the biliary tract, etc.;
- total pancreatectomy;
- sclerotherapy of the varicose veins of the lower limb;
- peritoneovenous shunting performed with diuretics-resistant ascites;
- portocaval anastomoses;
- parenteral nutrition;
- ERAS (Enhanced Recovery After Surgery).

== Scientific and teaching activities ==
Alexey Nikolaevich Severtsev is a member of 5 international surgical associations. He is also an honorary member of the WALA – the World Academy of Laser Applications as well as a certified specialist in surgery and oncology. He has more than 250 publications; speeches made in different surgical congresses and training lectures.

== Achievements ==
- plasma flows (1997);
- first liver autotransplantation (“Pihlmayer’s operation”) in Russia (1999);
- first stump extirpation of the pancreas with recurrent pancreatic cancer after previously performed pancreatic-duodenal resection in Russia (2008);
- first modified Appleby operation (II) in Russia (2011).

== Publications ==
1. Brekhov E.I., Kuleshov I.Yu., Bashilov V.P., Severtsev A.N., Tchekmarev O.M. «Prospects of gastrointestinal CO2 — laser surgery». In: Wilhelm & Raphaela Waidelich (eds) «Lasers / Optoelectronics in Medicine» (Proceeds of the 9th International Congress «Laser 89 Optoelectronics»), pp. 8 – 11 (Springer — Verlag, Berlin, 1990; 497 p.);
2. Brekhov E.I., Severtsev A.N., Kuleshov I.Yu. «Pancreatic resection with CO2 — laser». In: Wilhelm & Raphaela Waidelich (eds) «Lasers / Optoelectronics in Medicine» (Proceeds of the 9th International Congress «Laser 89 Optoelectronics»), pp. 27 – 31 (Springer — Verlag, Berlin, 1990; 497 p.);
3. Severtsev A., Tchilina T. «Our experience with a fibrin sealant (Tissucol) and fibrin — adhesive coated collagen fleece (TachoComb) in liver surgery». In: «European IHPBA Congress „Athens’ 95“, 25 −28 May 1995. Proceedings of the Congress». Monduzzi Editore, Bologna, Italy, 1995, pp. 339–402, 1109 P.
4. Severtsev A., Shugurov V., Malov Yu. «Techniques for bleeding esophageal varices: YAG — laser coagulation versus sclerosing therapy». In: «European IHPBA Congress „Athens’ 95“, 25 −28 May 1995. Proceedings of the Congress». Monduzzi Editore, Bologna, Italy, 1995, pp. 443–447, 1109 P.
5. Severtsev A.N., Lipatov N.I., Nistratov V.I., Samorodov V.G. «New argon laser for surgery and photo dynamic therapy (PDT). Diagnostic and therapeutic modalities». In: «New technology in surgery». International Congress. Abstract Book, Luxembourg, June 11 — 17, 1995.
6. Severtsev A., Shugurov V., Malov Yu. «Semi — invasive techniques for bleeding esophageal varices: YAG — laser coagulation versus sclerosing therapy». In: «36th World Congress of Surgery. International Surgical Week ISW95. Lisbon, Portugal, August 27 to September 2, 1995. Abstract Book». p. 207 (#825), 1995.
7. Severtsev A., Pasternak N., Kornev A., Bashilov V. «First experience of sclerotherapy of small liver lesions». 2nd World Congress of the International Hepato — Pancreato — Biliary Association, Bologna, Italy, 2–6 June 1996, Proceedings of the Congress, Monduzzi Editore, 1996, Bologna, Italy, Vol.1, pp. 307–311, 507P.
8. Severtsev A., Chegin V., Ivanova E. «Surgical treatment of cirrhotic ascites (paracentesis, peritoneovenous shunting, narrow — lumen mesocaval PTFE interposition shunt with fibrin sealant)». 2nd World Congress of the International Hepato — Pancreato — Biliary Association, Bologna, Italy, 2–6 June 1996, Proceedings of the Congress, Monduzzi Editore, 1996, Bologna, Italy, Vol.1, pp. 503–507, 507P.
9. Severtsev A. «Different adhesive materials for hemostasis on the raw liver surface». // 4th Congress of the European Chapter of the IHPBA, Amsterdam, the Netherlands, May 27–30, 2001. Proceedings of the Congress. — 2001. — Monduzzi Editore S.p.A., Bologna, Italy. — Medimond Inc. — pp. 257–262.
10. Brehov E. I., Litvin G. D., Kirpichev A. G., Severtsev A. N. “The use of laser during combined operations in patients with gastric cancer”. Surgery (Moscow), No.7: 70 - 74, 1987.
11. Brehov E. I., Severtsev A. N., Chegin V. M., Kuleshov I. U. “Considering advantages of dynamical omentopancreatostomy in the treatment of necrotic pancreatitis”. Surgery (Moscow), No.2, pp. 127 – 133, 1991.
12. Brusov P. G., Mataphonov V. A., Severtsev A. N. “Photodynamic therapy of malignant tumors”. Oncology, t.40, No.4-6, pp. 139–145, 1994.
13. Severtsev A. N., Brehov E. I., Mullen I., Ben'amu I.-P., Al Vatban P. “Immunomodulatory effect of laser radiation on a mixed culture of human lymphocytes (MLC) in transplantation of pancreatic islets”. “The new technologies in surgical hepatology”. (Materials of the third conference of surgeons – hepatologists, 14–16 June 1995, Saint-Petersburg), pp, 456–457, Saint-Petersburg, 1995.
14. Brehov E. I., Bashilov V. P., Severtsev A. N. “Prospects for liver surgery”. Klinicheskiy Vestnik, October – December, 1994, pp. 36–38.
15. Severtsev A. N. “First experience of wound adhesive coating “Tachocomb” in liver surgery”. Klinicheskiy Vestnik, July – September, 1995, pp. 24–26.
16. Severtsev A. N., Shugurov V. A., Malov U. I. “Modern methods of non-surgical treatment of bleeding from varicose veins of the lower limbs: comparative assessment of the laser radiation (Nd:YAG) and polidocanol sclerotherapy (“Aethoxysklerol”). Klinicheskiy Vestnik, January – March, 1996, pp. 61–63.
17. Severtsev A. N.: “Polidocanol sclerotherapy (“Aethoxysklerol”) as modern treatment of varicose veins of the lower limbs”. Klinicheskiy Vestnik, April – June, 1996, pp. 65–68.
18. Severtsev A. N. “Fibrin glue and other hemostatic agents in liver surgery”. Klinicheskiy Vestnik, July – September, 1996, pp. 71–74.
19. Severtsev A. N., Ivanova E. N. “The experience of using “Detralex” in the treatment of patients with venous insufficiency in surgical hospitals”. Phlebolymphology, 1996, No.3, p. 15-16.
20. Brehov E. I., Severtsev A. N., Bashilov V. P., Laptev V. V., Kuleshov I. U., Ivanova E. N., Suslov N. I. “The first experience of cytoreductive surgery (cytoreduction) against neoplastic lesions in the liver”. Klinicheskiy Vestnik, 1997, No.3, p. 23-26.
21. Severtsev A. N., Ivanova E. I., Suslov N. I., Bashilov V. P., Gribunov U. P., Merzlyakova E. S., Repin I. G. “The use of some physical methods to achieve hemostasis on the surface of the liver after its resection”. Klinicheskiy Vestnik, 1997, No.3, p. 26-29.
22. Severtsev A. N. “Portal Hypertension” Overview. Klinicheskiy Vestnik, 1997, No.3, p. 35-39.
23. Shugurov V. A., Blohin A. P., Malov U. I., Severtsev A. N., Suhinina T. M., Osin V. L., Nikiforov P. A. “Physical methods in endoscopic treatment of bleeding from the upper parts of the gastrointestinal tract”. Kremlin medicine (Klinicheskiy Vestnik). - No.4 (October 0 December), 1998. – p. 55-58.
24. Severtsev A. N., Brehov E. I, Mironov N. P., Repin I. G., Ivanova E. N., Bashilov V. P. “The use of some pharmaceutical products to reach the final hemostasis in liver resections in clinical practice”. – Kremlin medicine (Klinicheskiy Vestnik). - No.2 (April – June), 2000. – p. 22-26.
25. Severtsev A. N., Brehon E. I., Mironov N. P., Ivanova E. N., Repin I. G. “The use of local pharmaceutical products to reach the final hemostasis in liver resections”. Surgery – 2001. - No.1. – p. 75-79.
26. Severtsev A. N., Mironov N. P., Ivanova E. N., Chegin V. M., Laptev V. V., Brontwein A. T., Baginskaya I. S. “Postoperative complications and the efficiency of utilization of “Maxipime” during the operations on the liver of patients with a high risk of infectious complications”. Kremlin medicine (Klinicheskiy Vestnik). - No.1.2001. – p. 48-52.
27. Severtsev A. N., Schuplova E. N., Remizov M. V., Aleksandrov V. E. “Liver resection: the postoperative period and the use of the analogue of somatostatinum (Sandostatinum) for the prevention of complications”. Surgery. – 2001. - No.11. – p. 61-65.
28. Severtsev A. N., Nikolaenko e. M., Brehov E. I., schuplova E. N., Bogdanov A. E., Petruk E. V., Repin I. G., Hohlov A. V. “Liver autotransplantation in the treatment of its focal lesions”. Surgery. – 2002. - No.1. – p. 52-58.
29. Severtsev A. N., Brehov E. I., Mironov N. P., Repin I. G., Ivanova E. N., Bashilov V. P. “The use of some pharmaceutical products to reach the final hemostasis in liver resections in clinical practice”. “Tachocomb - five years of experience of the use in Russia. Digest of acticles: hemostasis and tissue bonding”. – «Nycomed Russia – Jpbureau”. – Copenhagen – Moscow. – June, 2001. – p. 26-33.
30. Malinovskiy N. N., Severtsev A. N., Smirnova N. B. “Cytoreductive surgery of colorectal liver cancer: principles and intra-arterial regional chemotherapy”. Surgery. – 2003. - No.3. – p. 14-21.
31. Malinovskiy N. N., Severtsev A. N., Chudaev D. B. “Laparoscopic exploration and needle biopsy of liver tumors at diagnosis of focal hepatic lesions”. Surgery. – 2004. - No.5. – p. 4-8.
32. “Portal hypertension” (Severtsev A. N.). “Acute surgical diseases” (manuals for students of fifth-year and sixth-year students). Edited by prof. Stupin V. A. and prof. Laptev V. V. – The edition of “Russian State Medical University of Ministry of Health of Russian Federation”, the surgery department of medical faculty, the 3rd edition. – 2004. – p. 197.
33. Severtsev A. “Sandostatinum for the treatment of neuroendocrine tumors of the gastrointestinal tract”. – 2004. - No.18(95). – p. 38-47.
34. Brehov E.I., Severtsev A. N., Nikiforov P. A., Repin A. G. “Sclerotherapy of the varicose veins of the esophagus of the patients with portal hypertension” (Manuals). – 2005. p. 27.
35. Brehov E. I., Severtsev A. N., Repin I. G. “Pharmacological hemostasis in liver surgery” (Manuals). – 2005. – p. 34.
36. Severtsev A. N., Stupin V. A. “”Sandostatinum” in abdominal surgery”. (Manual for practicing doctors). – “Triada” edition. – 2005. p. 144.
37. Malinovskiy N. N., severtsev A. N. “The usage of implanted intravascular catheters with subcutaneous “ports” in the treatment of surgical diseases”. Surgery. – 2005. - No.8. – p. 4-9.
38. Severtsev A. N., Chudaev D. B. “The usage of erythropoietin during the extensive operations of liver and pancreas”. Surgery. – 2006. - No.12. – p. 33-36.
39. Grishina I. M., Severtsev A. N., Kogonia L. M. “T he value of regional chemotherapy in the treatment of metastatic of colorectal liver cancer”. Surgery. - No.1. – 2010. – p. 18-21.
