= Evdokiya Gogotsky =

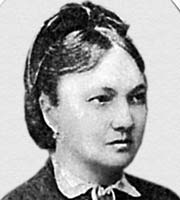
- Born: 1823; Kyiv, Russian Empire
- Died: 1888 (aged 64–65); Kyiv

Evdokiya Ivanivna Gogotsky (1823–1888), was a Ukrainian public figure and philanthropist. She was a leading women's rights activist in Ukraine, particularly active within the efforts to provide women with more professional and educational possibilities, and was one of the founders of the Women's Higher Courses in Kyiv (1879).
