= Alexandra Glagoleva-Arkadieva =

Soviet physicist

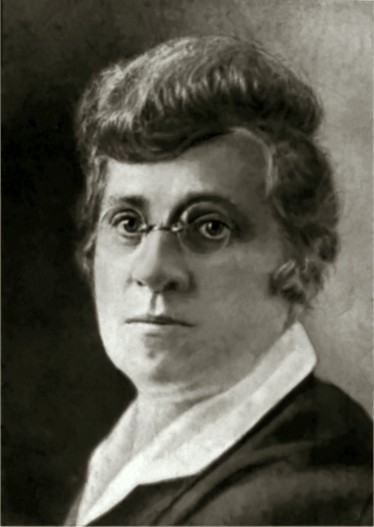
Alexandra Glagoleva-Arkadieva

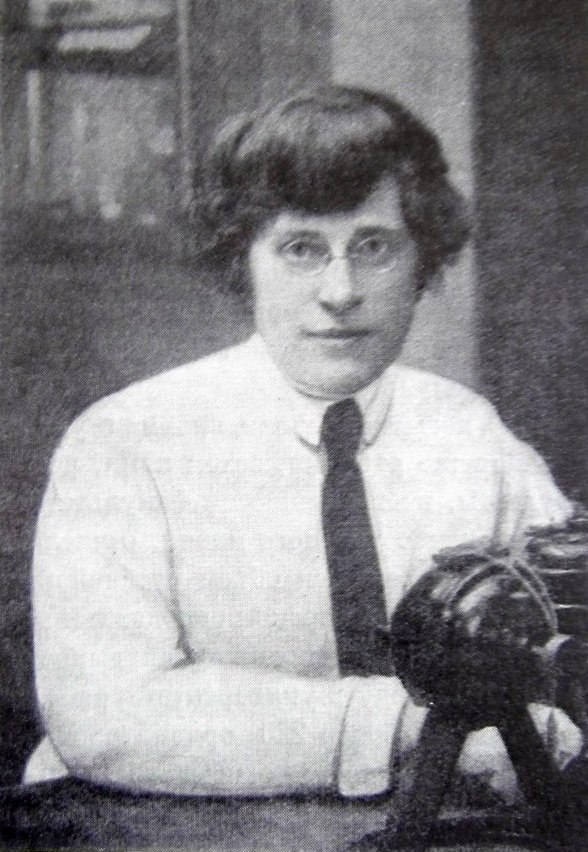
Glagoleva-Arkadieva in the 1920s

Alexandra Andreevna Glagoleva-Arkadieva (Russian: Александра Андреевна Глаголева-Аркадьева; 28 February 1884 – 30 October 1945) was a Russian and Soviet physicist known for her research on medical imaging using X-rays, mechanisms for generating microwaves, and spectrometry in the far infrared regions of the electromagnetic spectrum. She was the first Russian woman to become internationally known for her physics research.

== Life and career ==
Glagoleva was born in 1884 in what was then the Russian Empire, and educated in a secondary school in Tula, an industrial city south of Moscow. She worked as a schoolteacher in the country from 1900 to 1906, then studied physics and mathematics with Alexander Alexandrowitsch Eichenwald and Nikolay Umov in the Moscow Higher Courses for Women.

After finishing her studies there in 1910, she became an assistant for the Higher Courses. In 1911, women in Russia were granted the right to take the state examinations for becoming university professors; Glagoleva passed hers in 1914, and became an assistant in physics at Moscow State University in 1917, where her husband Vladimir Arkadiev also worked; in 1919 she joined his newly-founded laboratory on electromagnetism, and later led the laboratory. She also continued to work at the Second Moscow State University when it was established as a continuation of the Higher Courses in 1918, during the Russian Revolution.

At Moscow State University, she became the founding head of a department of applied physics for the natural sciences in 1932. She became a full member of the Research Institute of Physics of Moscow State University in 1933, and was awarded a doctorate (on the basis of past work, with no thesis) in 1935. She also headed of department at the Medical Institute of the Second University. She retired from this position for medical reasons in 1937, and from her teaching and administrative responsibilities at Moscow State University in 1939. She died on 30 October 1945.

== Research ==
During World War I, Glagoleva-Arkadieva applied her expertise in physics to the organization, design, and construction of an X-ray facility at the University's hospital, and its application in finding metal fragments and bullets in wounded soldiers from the war; she later repurposed the facility to assist in childbirth, and in those years regularly lectured on the medical applications of X-rays.

In the early 1920s she began her work on the generation of microwaves by passing sparks through metal filings, embedded in oil. This led her in the mid-1920s to place the entire electromagnetic spectrum into a single continuum, and by the late 1920s she was studying the spectral power density of the resulting radiation. This research developed in the 1930s into her studies of the far infrared spectrum, using diffraction gratings to isolate emissions of different frequencies. Her final research topic, in the late 1930s and early 1940s, considered the detailed emission mechanism and modes of vibration of the microwave emitter that she had invented in her earlier work.
