= Anna Missuna =

Russian geologist

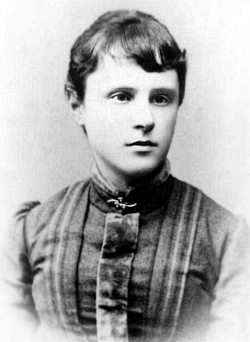
- Born: 12 November 1868; Vitebsk Region
- Died: 2 May 1922 (aged 53)
- Education: Moscow Highest Women's Courses
- Scientific career
- Fields: Geology

Anna Boleslavovna Missuna (12 November 1868 – 2 May 1922) was a Russian-born Polish geologist, mineralogist, and paleontologist. She was a chemistry professor at the Moscow Highest Women's Courses, and taught petrography, paleontology, historical geology, and historical geography. Her research focused on finite moraines in Poland, Lithuania, and Russia, glacial features in Belarus and Latvia, and the Jurassic corals of Crimea. She published in Russian and German.

== Early life ==
Missuna was born in the Vitebsk Region (then part of the Russian empire, now part of Belarus). Her parents were Polish. She was educated in Riga, where she learned to speak German, and in Moscow, where she had a scholarship for higher education from 1893 to 1896. She pursued further study in mineralogy with Vladimir Vernadsky and crystallographer Evgraf Fedorov.

== Career ==
Her first geology article appeared in 1898, a study of the crystalline forms of ammonium sulfate, co-authored with L. V. Yakovleva, published in the journal of the Moscow Naturalist Society. She worked often with V. D. Sokolov on the study of Quaternary deposits. She wrote scientific articles about finite moraines in Poland, Lithuania, and Russia, glacial features in Belarus and Latvia, and the Jurassic corals of Crimea. She published articles and monographs in both Russian and German.

From 1907 to 1922, Missuna was a chemistry professor at her alma mater, the Moscow Highest Women's Courses, assisting V. D. Sokolov. She also taught petrography, paleontology, historical geology, and historical geography.

Missuna died in May 1922, aged 53 years.
