= Pavel Vasilyevich Sergeyev =

- Born: October 18, 1931; Tula, RSFSR, Soviet Union
- Died: April 18, 2007 (aged 75)
- Education: 2nd MSMI
- Known for: Molecular Pharmacology
- Awards: Order of the Badge of Honour
- Scientific career
- Fields: Pharmacology
- Workplaces: Russian National Research Medical University

Pavel Vasilyevich Sergeyev (Russian: Павел Васильевич Сергеев; 18 October 1931, in Tula, RSFSR – 18 April 2007) was a Soviet Russian pharmacologist, Doctor of Medical Sciences, Professor, Academician of the Russian Academy of Medical Sciences (1991) and Correspondent Member of the USSR Academy of Medical Sciences (1986). Honored Scientist of the Russian Federation (1996), and Laureate of the State Prize of the Russian Federation in the field of science and technology for the year 1997.

He graduated from the 2nd MSMI in 1955, and defended his Candidat thesis in 1958. In 1966, he defended his doctoral thesis.

All his life he worked in his alma mater, the Russian National Research Medical University (also known as 2nd MSMI and RSMU), where he organized the Faculty of Medical Biology and served as its dean for five years.

Starting in 1968, he headed the Department of Molecular Pharmacology and Radiobiology at RSMU, which he created, and now it bears his name.

He was a member of the Russian Apitherapy Coordinating Council.
