= Ferromagnetic resonance =

Spectroscopic technique to probe the magnetization of ferromagnetic materials

Ferromagnetic resonance, or FMR, is coupling between an electromagnetic wave and the magnetization of a medium through which it passes. This coupling induces a significant loss of power of the wave. The power is absorbed by the precessing magnetization (Larmor precession) of the material and lost as heat. For this coupling to occur, the frequency of the incident wave must be equal to the precession frequency of the magnetization (Larmor frequency) and the polarization of the wave must match the orientation of the magnetization.

This effect can be used for various applications such as spectroscopic techniques or conception of microwave devices.

The FMR spectroscopic technique is used to probe the magnetization of ferromagnetic materials. It is a standard tool for probing spin waves and spin dynamics. FMR is very broadly similar to electron paramagnetic resonance (EPR), and also somewhat similar to nuclear magnetic resonance (NMR), except that FMR probes the sample magnetization resulting from the magnetic moments of dipolar-coupled but unpaired electrons, while NMR probes the magnetic moment of atomic nuclei that are screened by the atomic or molecular orbitals surrounding such nuclei of non-zero nuclear spin.

The FMR resonance is also the basis of various high-frequency electronic devices, such as resonance isolators or circulators.

== History ==
Ferromagnetic resonance was experimentally discovered by V. K. Arkad'yev when he observed the absorption of UHF radiation by ferromagnetic materials in 1911. A qualitative explanation of FMR along with an explanation of the results from Arkad'yev was offered up by Ya. G. Dorfman in 1923, when he suggested that the optical transitions due to Zeeman splitting could provide a way to study ferromagnetic structure.

A 1935 paper published by Lev Landau and Evgeny Lifshitz predicted the existence of ferromagnetic resonance of the Larmor precession, which was independently verified in experiments by J. H. E. Griffiths (UK) and E. K. Zavoiskij (USSR) in 1946.

== Description ==
FMR arises from the precessional motion of the (usually quite large) magnetization $\scriptstyle\vec{M}$ of a ferromagnetic material in an external magnetic field $\scriptstyle\vec{H}$. The magnetic field exerts a torque on the sample magnetization which causes the magnetic moments in the sample to precess. The precession frequency of the magnetization depends on the orientation of the material, the strength of the magnetic field, as well as the macroscopic magnetization of the sample; the effective precession frequency of the ferromagnet is much lower in value from the precession frequency observed for free electrons in EPR. Moreover, linewidths of absorption peaks can be greatly affected both by dipolar-narrowing and exchange-broadening (quantum) effects. Furthermore, not all absorption peaks observed in FMR are caused by the precession of the magnetic moments of electrons in the ferromagnet. Thus, the theoretical analysis of FMR spectra is far more complex than that of EPR or NMR spectra.

The basic setup for an FMR experiment is a microwave resonant cavity with an electromagnet. The resonant cavity is fixed at a frequency in the super high frequency band. A detector is placed at the end of the cavity to detect the microwaves. The magnetic sample is placed between the poles of the electromagnet and the magnetic field is swept while the resonant absorption intensity of the microwaves is detected. When the magnetization precession frequency and the resonant cavity frequency are the same, absorption increases sharply which is indicated by a decrease in the intensity at the detector.

Furthermore, the resonant absorption of microwave energy causes local heating of the ferromagnet. In samples with local magnetic parameters varying on the nanometer scale this effect is used for spatial dependent spectroscopy investigations.

The resonant frequency of a film with parallel applied external field $B$ is given by the Kittel formula:

$$f = \frac{\gamma} {2 \pi} \sqrt{B (B + \mu_0 M)}$$

where $M$ is the magnetization of the ferromagnet and $\gamma$ is the gyromagnetic ratio.

== See also ==
- Electron paramagnetic resonance
- Nuclear magnetic resonance
