= Vera Varsanofieva =

Russian geologist and school teacher (1890-1976)

- Вера Варсанофьева
- Born: July 22, 1890; Moscow, Russian Empire
- Died: 29 June 1976 (aged 85); Moscow, Soviet Union
- Resting place: Novodevichy Cemetery
- Education: Higher Women's Courses
- Known for: first woman - doctor of geological and mineralogical sciences
- Title: Professor (1925)
- Awards: Order of Lenin (1974); Order of the Red Banner of Labour; Order of the Badge of Honour; Medal "For the Defence of Moscow"; Medal "For Valiant Labour in the Great Patriotic War 1941–1945"; Medal "In Commemoration of the 800th Anniversary of Moscow"
- Scientific career
- Fields: Geology
- Academic advisors: A. A. Chernov, A. P. Pavlov

Signature
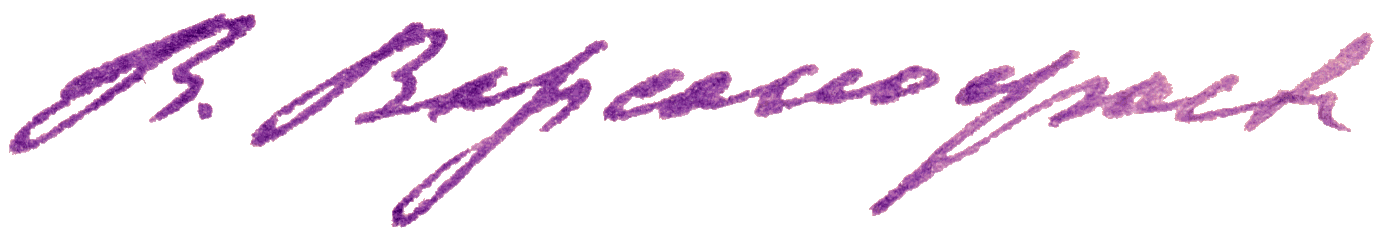

Vera Aleksandrovna Varsanofieva (Russian: Вера Александровна Варсанофьева; 22 July 1890, Moscow – 29 June 1976) was a Soviet geologist, geomorphologist, a member-correspondent of the USSR Academy of Pedagogical Sciences, and an honored scientist of the RSFSR. She was the first woman to be awarded the degree of Doctor of Geological and Mineralogical Sciences.

== Biography ==
Born in Moscow to a military family, she received her initial education at home under the guidance of her mother, the French, Yulia Lvovna, who taught her foreign languages and aroused her interest in scientific pursuits. Varsanofieva spent most of her childhood in Ryazan, according to the duty station of her father. At the age of 13, she entered the Mariinsky Women's Gymnasium in Ryazan. In 1906, she graduated with a gold medal. At 14 years old, Varsanofieva told her parents that she would be a geologist. In the gymnasium, the sister of the future professor-geologist A. D. Arkhangelsky became a classmate and friend of Varsanofieva. To supplement her education in mathematics and history, she began to attend the 8th grade at the V. P. Cimicky private gymnasium.

In 1907, she entered the physics and mathematics department of the Higher Women's Courses in Moscow. In the summer of 1911, Professor A. A. Chernov organized the first excursion to the Northern Urals for students, and thus V. A. Varsanofieva first came to the area, which later became the site of her many years of geological research.

In 1915, Varsanofieva passed the state exams at the First State Testing Commission at the Moscow Higher Women's Courses and was left at the geology department of these courses "to prepare for a professorship". From 1916 to 1919, she taught at the Moscow Prechistenskii working courses. In 1918, as an assistant, she gave lectures on geology and mineral resources at the Moscow Higher Courses for Women, and then at Moscow State University in the Department of A. P. Pavlov. Since 1920, as an assistant professor at the 1st Moscow State University, she read the first special tectonics course in Moscow. In 1919–24 she taught at the Tver Pedagogical Institute, at the Ivanovo-Voznesensky Pedagogical and Polytechnic Institutes. In 1921–1924, she conducted research, mainly in the mountainous belt of the Northern Urals.

In 1925 she was briefly arrested. In 1925-1956 she taught at the 2nd Moscow State University (from 1930 - MGPI them. V. I. Lenin ), where she read her original course in mineralogy and geology, which included the basics of paleontology and lectures on dynamic and historical geology. In 1934–1935, under the leadership of Varsanofieva, a course of teaching geology was developed.

In 1935, for the totality of the works of V. A. Varsanofieva that were published by that time, she was the first woman to receive the degree of Doctor of Geological and Mineralogical Sciences without defending a thesis.

Academician V.A. Obruchev recommended in 1941 to print her book "The Origin and Structure of the Earth" with the following words: "The book is read with great interest and even I have learned from it quite a bit of new knowledge departments that are less close to me."

In 1945, she was elected a Corresponding Member of the Academy of Pedagogical Sciences of the USSR.

Since 1954, living in Moscow, she worked as a senior researcher and head of the laboratory (1961-1964) in the Institute of Geology, Komi branch of the USSR. In 1970, she retired.

In 1976, she died and was buried at the Novodevichy Cemetery in Moscow.

== Membership organizations ==
- since 1916 member of the society of lovers of natural science, anthropology and Ethnography.
- since 1923 — member of the Moscow society of naturalists. Vice-President of the society since 1942.
- since 1927 — member of the Geographical society of the USSR.

== Awards ==
- 1944 — Medal "For the Defence of Moscow"
- 1946 — Medal "For Valiant Labour in the Great Patriotic War 1941–1945"
- 1945 — Order of the Red Banner of Labour
- 1948 — Medal "In Commemoration of the 800th Anniversary of Moscow"
- 1950 — Gold Medal to them. A.P. Karpinsky Academy of Sciences of the USSR (For the totality of geological works)
- 1953 — Order of Lenin
- 1957 — Honored Worker of Science and Technology of the Komi ASSR
- 1960 — Honored Scientist of the RSFSR
- 1970 — Order of the Badge of Honour

== Bibliography ==
She is the author of over 150 scientific papers. Among them:

- In 1934 she published "The Origin of the Urals and its mountainous wealth" with 22 maps and 68 illustrations summarizing the history of geological development of the Urals.

When geology lessons were introduced into high school, she wrote: О преподавании геологии и минералогии в средней школе [On the teaching of geology and mineralogy in high school]. Earth science. 1 (51). 1940., Преподавание геологических дисциплин в русской школе до Октябрьской революции [Teaching geological disciplines in the Russian school before the October Revolution]. Natural science at school (2). 1946., Преподавание минералогии и геологии в советской школе [Teaching mineralogy and geology in the Soviet school]. Natural science at school (3). 1946.

- In the book The Origin and Structure of the Earth (1945), for the first time in the popular science form, the main ideas of A.E. Fersman and V.I. Vernadsky in the field of geochemistry and cosmochemistry are presented. The author of the book about his teacher, academician A. P. Pavlov(Варсанофьева В. А. (1947). Алексей Петрович Павлов и его роль в развитии геологии [Alexey P. Pavlov and his role in the development of geology] (in Russian) (2nd ed.). Мoscow: Б. и.) and biographical sketches of his contemporaries — geologists V. A. Obruchev, A. E. Fersman, A. D. Arkhangelsky, A. A. Chernov and others.
- In 1947, the 2nd edition of a book about a teacher: A. P. Pavlov and his role in the development of geology M., 1947
- In 1948 her book, The Life of the Mountains, was published.
- In 1949, under her leadership, a manual for teachers, "Geological Excursions" (by G. G. Astrov), was prepared, the books appear: How people learned what happened on Earth a million years ago. M., 1949; The life of the city of Moscow, 1950; Moscow Society of Nature Testers and its importance in the development of national science, M., 1955.

== Legacy ==
V. A. Varsanofieva was commemorated in the names of several landforms:

- Mountain and glacier in the Subpolar Urals.
- Cape on the island of Novaya Zemlya.

Fossils:

- Tollina warsanofievae Barskaja — a type of stromatoporoid, the upper Ordovician of Northern Siberia.
- Palaeoleptophycus warsanofievae Korde, 1955 — a kind of algae, the upper Cambrian of Siberia.
- Darwinula warsanofievae Beliajeva — species of ostracods, Permian of the Russian platform.
- Sphaerestheria warsanofievae Molin — a kind of phyllopod, Permian of the Russian platform.

== Literature ==
- "Varsanofieva, Vera Aleksandrovna". Great Soviet Encyclopedia (Online ed.).
- Варсанофьева Вера Александровна. Biografiye.ru (in Russian). Archived from the original on 7 June 2022.
- Nalivkin, Dmitry Vasilievich (1979). Наши первые женщины-геологи [Our first women geologists] (in Russian). Leningrad: Наука.
- "Варсанофьева" (PDF). NTB ISTU. Archived (PDF) from the original on 20 September 2011.
- "Жертвы репрессий. Вера Александровна Варсанофьева". Archived from the original on 31 October 2013.
