= Vladimir Arkadiev =

Russian and Soviet physicist

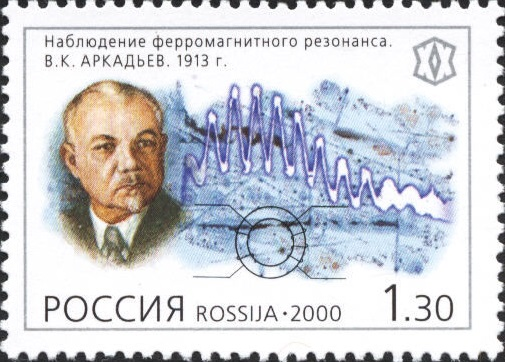
A 2000 Russian postage stamp commemorating Arkadiev

Vladimir Konstantinovich Arkadiev (Russian: Владимир Константинович Аркадьев; 21 April 1884 – 1 December 1953) was a Russian and Soviet physicist who studied magnetism and related phenomena. He was among the first to make use of the Meissner effect to levitate magnets as a test of superconductivity.

Arkadiev was born in Moscow. While still a young boy, his father died and his mother worked in a library leading to an early interest in studies. While still at high school he met Nikolay Umov and became interested in physics. He joined Moscow State University in 1904 and studied ferromagnetism under fields under Pyotr Lebedev. Arkadiev's studies were interrupted by political troubles, quitting in 1911 to protest the administration of Lev Kasso. He specialized in ferromagnetism and discovered ferromagnetic resonance in 1913. After the October Revolution, he returned to Moscow University to establish a laboratory where he worked until the end of his life. Along with his wife and fellow-researcher Alexandra Glagoleva-Arkadieva he worked on electromagnetic wave spectroscopy in 1922-24. He became an associate member of the Academy of Sciences of the Soviet Union in 1927.
