= Central Economic Mathematical Institute =

Economic theory and econometrics research center in Moscow

- Центральный экономико-математический институт
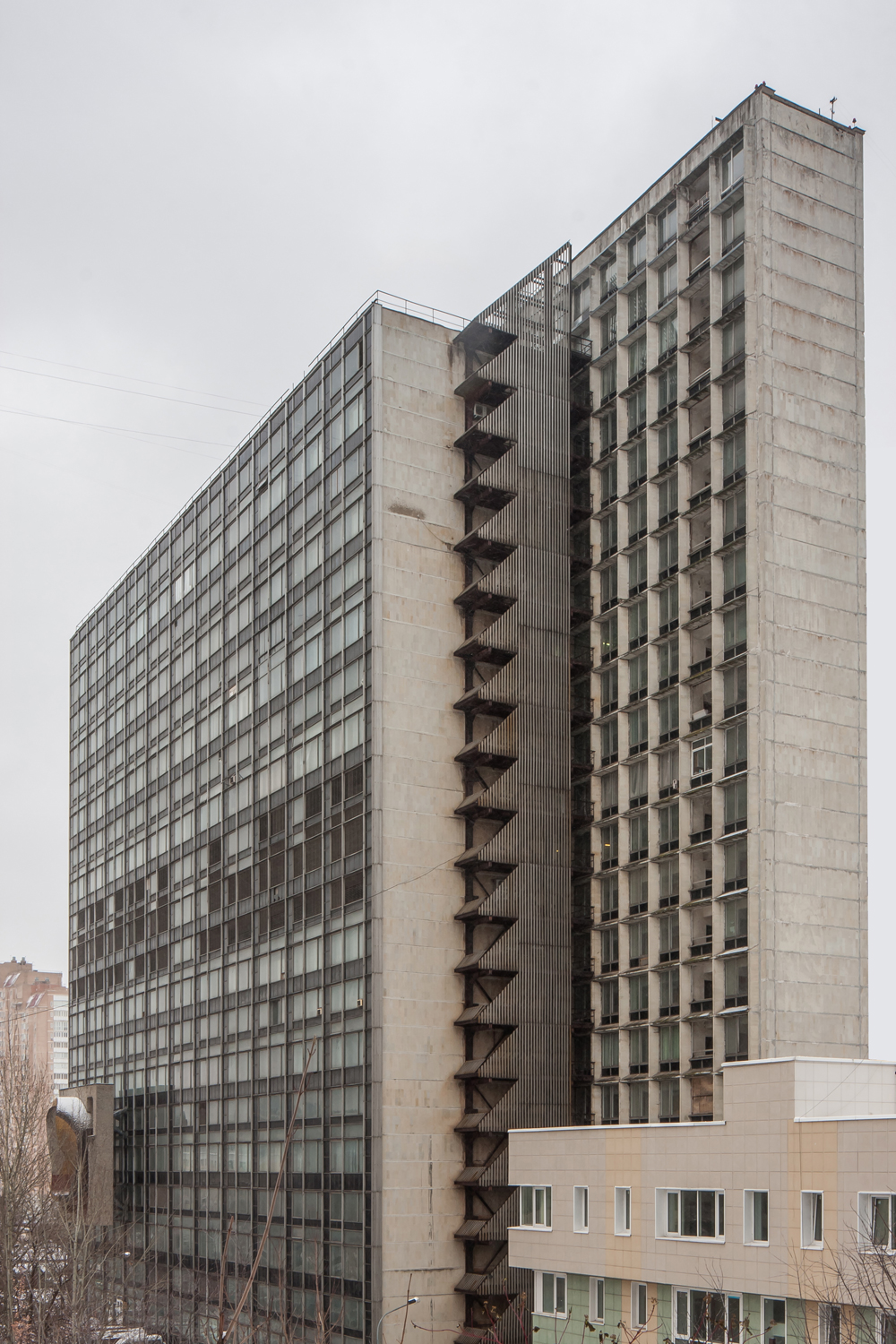
- Location: Moscow, Russia
- Coordinates: 55°40′29″N 37°34′03″E
- Official language: Russian
- Website: cemi.rssi.ru

The Central Economic Mathematical Institute (Russian: Центральный экономико-математический институт (ЦЭМИ)) of the Russian Academy of Sciences is an economic research institute located in Moscow. It focuses on economic theory, mathematical economics and econometrics. The CEMI was established in 1963 as an institute of the Academy of Sciences of the USSR, superseding the Laboratory of Economics and Mathematical Methods which had been founded by Vasily Sergeevich Nemchinov in 1958. In 1964 a branch of the institute was created in Tallinn, and in 1966 a Leningrad branch was established.

"When the Institute was founded in 1963, is main goal was an "introduction on the mathematical methods and computers in the practice of planning, creation of the theory of the optimal control of the national economy". In fact, the initial founding vision of the Institute was more ambitious. Of six founding research objectives mentioned by Nikolay Fedorenko, CEMI's director in 1963-1985, in his 1964 notes, three of them directly bore on the "development of a unified system of economic information", the "design and creation of a unified state network of computer centers", and "Derivation of specialized planning and management systems based on mathematical methods and computer technology." Although its failure has since obscured this history, the Institute was initially meant to be the leading organization charged with creating a nationwide economic information network.

== Directors ==
- Nikolay Fedorenko, 1963-1985
- Valery Makarov (Russian: Валерий Леонидович Макаров), 1985-2017
- Albert Bakhtizin, 2017 -

== Building ==
The CEMI building features an alto-relievo mosaic composition of a Möbius strip on its facade, created by architect Leonid Pavlov and painter/monumentalists V. Vasiltsov and E. Zharenova in 1976.
