= Ekaterina Kletnova =

Russian archaeologist, ethnographer and writer (1869–1938)

Ekaterina Nikolaevna Kletnova (Russian: Екатерина Николаевна Клетнова, Czech: Jekatěrina Nikolajevna Kletnova; 22 January [O.S. 3 February] 1869, Moscow – 29 May 1938, Uzhhorod) was a Russian and Soviet archaeologist, ethnographer, historian, educator, translator and writer, active in Smolensk and Prague. Kletnova was educated at the Higher Courses for Women and the Moscow Archaeological Institute.
