= Srbui Lisitsian =

Soviet art historian (1893–1979)

- Սրբուհի Լիսիցյան
- Born: June 28, 1893; Tiflis, Russian Empire (now Tbilisi, Georgia)
- Died: 1979 (aged 85–86)
- Occupation: Ethnographer

Srbuhi Stepani Lisitsian (Note: Armenian: Սրբուհի Ստեփանի Լիսիցյան, romanized: Srbowhi Step’ani Lisic’yan; Russian: Србуи Степановна Лисициан, romanized: Srbui Stepanovna Lisitsian) (June 28, 1893 – 1979) was an Armenian-Soviet ethnographer known for her development of a novel mathematical method for describing folk dance precisely using film techniques. Lisitsian spent her career at the Armenian Institute of Archeology and Ethnology of the Armenian National Academy of Sciences as an ethnologist, after earning her Ph.D. at the Armenian Institute of History. In 1980, the Armenian Institute of Archeology and Ethnology was renamed after her and her father, another noted ethnologist.

== Biography ==
Srbuhi Lisitsyan was born in 1893 in Tbilissi in the family of Stepan Lisitsyan, a pedagogue and ethnographer. Her mother, Ekaterina Kristaporovna, was also a pedagogue.

Srbuhi's parents published the children's magazine "Hasker" (1905–1922), edited the "Taraz" weekly (1892-1893) and collaborated with prominent figures of Armenian culture: Hovhannes Tumanyan, Avetik Isahakyan, Alexander Shirvanzade, Ghazaros Aghayan, Hovhannes Hovhannisyan, L. With George Bashinjaghyan, Panos Terlemezyan, Yeghishe Tadosyan and others.

She is graduating from the Garye Girls' Higher Courses in Moscow with a degree in Russian-Roman literature. E. Ozarovskaya "Artistic Speech" studio, I. Chernetskaya Dance Studio.

== Activity ==
Lisitsyan returned to Tbilisi in 1917, where her organizational talent appeared. In the same year she founded a studio of recitation, rhythm and plastic, which in 1924 was transformed into the Rhythm Institute of Tbilisi.

In 1930 Lisitsyan settled in Yerevan. Due to her efforts, the "Rhythm, Plastics and Physical Culture" College (later "Rhythm and Plastics Studio") was opened in Yerevan in the same year. She managed the ethnographic ensemble of students and studio. With her direct participation, a dance school was opened in 1936. Lisitsyan became the first director of the college.

From 1930 she began to choreograph folk dances and write theatrical performances (plays). Lisitsyan's notes and theoretical analysis of Armenian folk dances were not only the first in the history of Armenian dance, but also had a fundamental significance.

The height of Srbuhi Lisitsyan's activity was the creation of a movement recording system. She studied the writing systems that existed before, took into account and addressed all the shortcomings of these, extracting all that was valuable. In 1940, Lisitsyan's work "Movement Record (Cinematography)" was published in Moscow, which was a logical continuation of the systems created before that.

The new method made it possible to easily analyze the movement in completely different ways on each count of the device. Thanks to the invention of Lisitsyan's movement, an eagle was created, where the number of dances now stands at more than 3,000. Srbuhi Lisitsyan was the first in the history of dance to bring to life the modern principle of writing, due to which the texts of movement, verbal, musical and imagery are brought to light, the linguistic, historical and geographical layers are revealed.

Lisitsyan was also the founder of artistic gymnastics in Transcaucasia. During the scientific expeditions she registered Armenian folk dances, theatrical actions, collected ethnographic and folklore materials. She authored many articles, works and translations, dance performances. She wrote the "Narine" ballet (with M. Barkhudaryan). She also translated the works of Armenian classics (L. Shant, At. Zoryan, R. Demirchyan) from Russian to Armenian.
