= Russian National Research Medical University =

University

Pirogov Russian National Research Medical University
- Российский национальный исследовательский медицинский университет имени Н. И. Пирогова
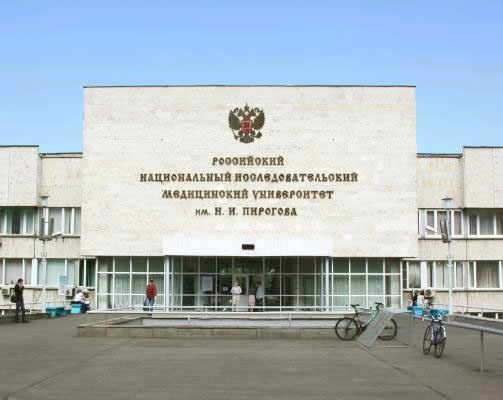
- University entrance
- Other names: Pirogov Russian National Research Medical University
- Former names: 2nd Moscow State Medical University, Russian State Medical University
- Type: Public
- Established: 1906
- Location: Ostrovityanova Street, 1, building 6, Moscow, Russia; 55°38′50″N 37°29′25″E
- Website: pirogov-university.com
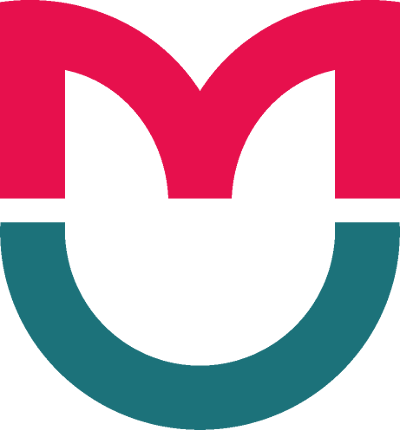

Pirogov Russian National Research Medical University (formerly known as Russian State Medical University) is a medical university in Moscow, Russia founded in 1906. It is fully accredited and recognized by Russia's Ministry of Education and Science and is under the authority of the Ministry of Health and Social Development. It was named after Russian surgeon and pedagogue N.I. Pirogov (1810-1888). In 2024 US News & World Report ranked it #1,563 in the world.

== Ratings ==
In 2024 US News & World Report ranked it # 1,563 in the world, tying it with Siberian Federal University. In 2014, the Russian rating agency "Expert RA" included it in its list of rated universities of higher educational of the Commonwealth of Independent States, assigning it a rating of "D".

== ‘Priority 2030’ Federal Program ==
Currently, Pirogov University is a powerful scientific, medical, and educational complex, possessing significant reputational, personnel, intellectual, and infrastructural resources, as well as an extensive network of partnerships in the scientific, medical, and educational spheres. It also has organizational and legal capabilities stemming from its status as a National Research University and a state autonomous organization. As part of its development strategy, the university plans to efficiently utilize and enhance these resources to achieve its strategic development goals, participate actively in the "PRIORITY 2030" Program, maximize its contribution to the national development objectives, and realize the university’s mission.

The goal of the university’s technological leadership is to develop and introduce into global practice cutting-edge (unparalleled) technologies for health preservation, disease treatment, and diagnosis, thereby positioning Russia as a leader in critical fields of biomedicine and medicine. To achieve this goal, the university initiates and implements strategic technological projects (STP).

== Courses ==
=== Undergraduate ===
- General Medicine: 6 years
- Pediatrics: 6 years
- Medical Biochemistry: 6 years
- Medical Biophysics: 6 years
- Medical Cybernetics: 6 years
- Dentistry: 5 years
- Pharmacy: 5 years
- Clinical Psychology: 5 years
- Social Work: 5 years

=== Clinical residency ===
- Obstetrics and Gynecology
- Dermatovenereology
- Ultrasonic diagnosis
- Plastic surgery
- Urology
- Allergology and immunology
- Anesthesiology and critical care medicine
- Hematology
- Pediatric endocrinology
- Cytology
- Neuroscience
- Neonatology
- Oncology
- ENT
- Ophthalmology
- Psychiatry and Addiction Medicine
- Forensic Pathology
- Gastroenterology
- Medical Genetics
- Family Medicine
- Pathology
- Psychiatry
- Psychotherapy
- Pulmonology
- Rheumatology
- Public Health
- Physical Therapy and Rehabilitation
- Pediatric surgery
- Endoscopic Surgery
- General Surgery
- Dental and Maxillofacial surgery
- Infectious diseases
- Cardiology
- Clinical pathology
- Clinical pharmacology
- Pediatrics
- Radiology
- Radiation oncology
- Internal Medicine
- Cardiovascular surgery
- Trauma and Orthopedic Surgery
- Endocrinology
- Clinical Physiology

=== Clinical Fellowships, Research, Teaching and Postdoctoral Positions ===
- Obstetrics and Gynaecology
- Anesthesiology and Critical Care Medicine
- ENT
- Internal medicine
- Gastroenterology
- Hematology
- Ophthalmology
- Pediatric surgery
- Dentistry
- Urology
- Trauma and Orthopedic Surgery
- Clinical Physiology
- General Surgery
- Infectious diseases
- Cardiology
- Clinical Immunology and Allergy
- Clinical pathology
- Dermatology and STDs
- Radiology
- Neurology
- Public health
- Medical Oncology
- Pathology
- Pediatrics
- Psychiatry and Addiction Medicine
- Pulmonology
- Rheumatology
- Cardiovascular Surgery
- Forensic Pathology
- Toxicology
- Clinical Pharmacology
- Endocrinology
- Sports medicine
- Physical Therapy and Rehabilitation
- Clinical Biochemistry
- Biology

=== Clinical internship training ===
- Internal Medicine
- Emergency Medicine
- Anesthesiology and Critical Care Medicine
- Obstetrics and Gynaecology
- Psychiatry
- General Surgery
- Paediatrics
- Radiology
- Dermatology and STDs
- Forensic Pathology
- Infectious diseases
- Pathology
- Neurology
- Neonatology
- Oncology
- Ophthalmology
- ENT
- Paediatric surgery
- Trauma and Orthopedic Surgery
- Public health
- Pulmonary Medicine

== Administration ==
=== Academic Council ===
Superior Authority of Russian National Research Medical University is the Academic Council.

=== Rectorate ===
Rectorate is the executive authority of the university. At its head is the Rector, and the structure of administration also includes five vice-chancellors, two vice-rector for Academic Affairs, Vice-Rector, Vice Rector for Clinical Work, and Vice President for Quartermaster.

=== Rectors ===
- Vladimir Guerrier, 1872–1888, 1900–1905
- Sergey Chaplygin, 1905–1919
- Sergey Namyotkin, 1919–1924
- Albert Pinkevich, 1924–1930
- Eugene Tsukershteyn, 1930–1931
- Joseph Rybak, 1932–1936
- Love Basias, 1937
- Abraham Cot, 1937–1946
- Sergei Milovidov, 1946–1956
- Oleg Kerbikov, 1956–1958
- Maria Sirotkin, 1958–1964
- Yuri Lopukhin, 1965–1984
- Vladimir Yarygin, 1984–2007
- Nikolai Volodin, 2007–2011
- Natalia Polunina, 2011–2012
- Andrei Kamkin, 2013–2015
- Sergey Lukyanov, 2015–

== Notable alumni ==
- Leonid Roshal - professor, MD, director of the Moscow Institute of Children's Emergency Surgery and Traumatology, member of Public Chamber of Russia, expert of the World Health Organization, Member of the Commission on Human Rights under President of Russian Federation, "Doctors of the World", "European of the Year" "Russian of the Year", "Star of Europe 2005", the president of the National Medical Chamber of Russia
- Galina Savelyeva - professor, gynaecologist and Doctor of Medical Sciences, Honored Scientist of Russia, laureate of the Russian Federation Government awards
- Vera Sidelnikov - professor, Doctor of Medical Sciences, Honored Scientist of Russia, laureate of the Russian Federation Government, the premium LS Persianinova
- Yakob D. Kahn - professor of urology in Moscow Medical Stomatological Institute, MD
- Michael Kechker - Soviet and Russian physician, cardiologist, MD, professor, academician of the Russian Academy of Medical and Technical Sciences, Honoured Doctor of the Russian Federation
- Georgy Znamensky (1903-1946) - Soviet athlete and prize winner of the USSR, Honored Master of Sports (1936), member of the CPSU (b) since 1941
- Serafim Ivanovich Znamensky (1906-1942) - Soviet athlete and prize winner of the USSR. Honored Master of Sports (1936)
- Dr Muhamad Akmal Saleh, Malaysian politician, Youth Chief of UMNO and Malacca State Exco for Health and Anti-Drugs
