= Women's Higher Courses (Kyiv) =

Women's higher education institution in Ukraine in (1878–1889) and (1906–1917)

Coordinates: 50.4498°N 30.5035°E

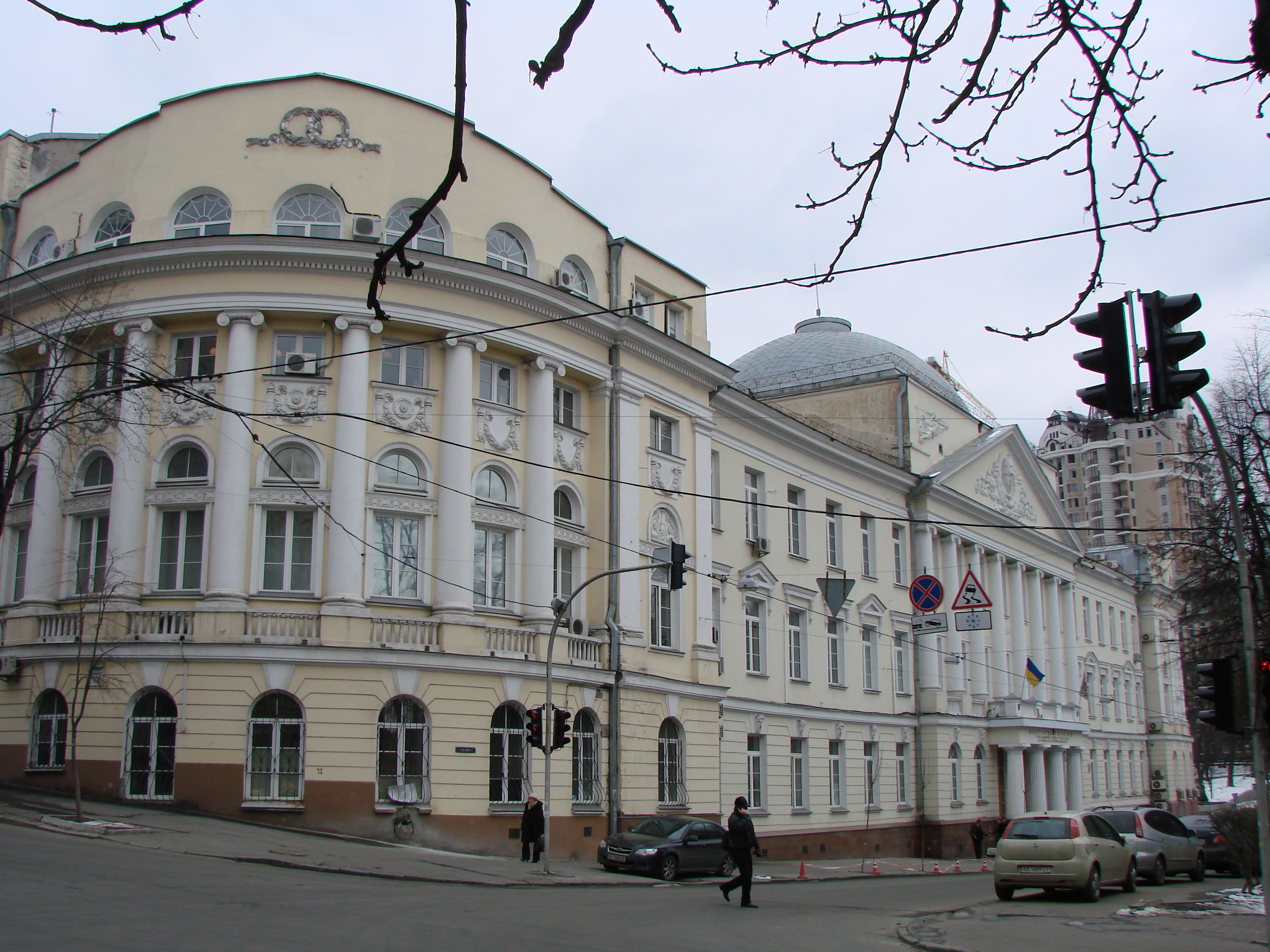
The last site of the Women's Higher Courses, at 55 Olesia Honchara St.

The Women's Higher Courses (Ukrainian: Киевские высшие женские курсы, romanized: Kijevskije vyssjevskije kursy), or KVZjK, in Kyiv was the first women's higher education institution in Tsarist Ukraine, active in (1878–1889) and (1906–1917).

The institute opened its doors in 1878. It was the first university open to women in Ukraine. A women's movement fighting for women's access to higher education emerged in Ukraine in the 19th century, similar to that of Russia. The Tsarist government founded the institution in order to stop the women from studying abroad, where they could come in contact with political opposition. The university did offer higher education, but similar to the Russian equivalent, did not offer an exam similar to the exam offered to men. Equivalent institutions of this kind were founded in Russia, as well as in Odessa in 1879, Charkov in 1880, and Jekaterinoslav in 1916.

== See also ==
- Guerrier Courses
- Bestuzhev Courses
