= Vladimir Guerrier =

Russian historian (1837–1919)

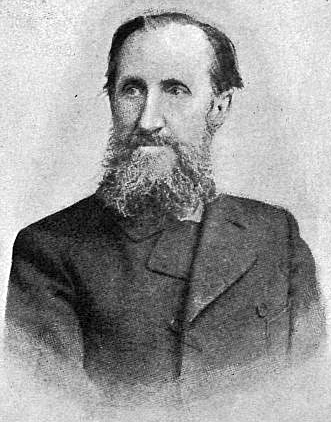
- V. I. Guerrier in 1915
- Born: 17 May 1837; Khovrino, a suburb of Moscow
- Died: 30 June 1919 (aged 82)
- Education: Doctor of Science (1868); Corresponding Member of the Russian Academy of Sciences
- Scientific career
- Fields: Philology, history
- Workplaces: Imperial Moscow University

Vladimir Ivanovich Guerrier (Russian: Владимир Иванович Герье; 29 May [O.S. 17 May] 1837 – 30 June 1919) was a Russian historian, professor of history at Moscow State University from 1868 to 1904. As the founder of the "Courses Guerrier", he was a leading instigator of higher education for women in Russia.

He was also a member of the Moscow City Duma, the State Council of Imperial Russia and the Octobrist Party.

Guerrier's name is sometimes transliterated from the Cyrillic into the Roman alphabet as Ger'e, but he himself preferred Guerrier. When publishing works in German, he used the form W. I. Guerrier (the W representing Wladimir).

== Life ==
Born in 1837 in Khovrino, a suburb of Moscow, Guerrier was descended from Huguenot immigrants to Russia who had moved from Hamburg. An uncle, Jean François Guerrier, otherwise Frantz Ivanovitch Guerrier, had arrived in the time of Catherine the Great to work as a millwright. Guerrier lost both parents as a small child and was brought up by relations as a Lutheran. He received his secondary education in Moscow at the parish school of the Evangelical Lutheran Church of Peter and Paul on Kozmodemyansk Street, now Starosadskiy Lane. In 1854 he entered the historical-philological faculty of the Moscow State University, where he was a student of Granovsky. Upon completing this course, he was retained by the university to prepare for a professorship, and at the same time he became a teacher of literature and history to the first Moscow Cadet Corps. In 1862, he defended his master's thesis: The struggle for the Polish throne in 1733, and then travelled abroad, spending three years in Germany, Italy and Paris. In 1865 he was elected a professor in the department of general history at Moscow University and began teaching there. Guerrier was a lifelong friend of the philosopher Vladimir Solovyov.

A strong campaigner for the independence of universities, in an article in Vestnik Evropy in 1876, Guerrier expressed the opposition of most Russian university professors in attacking proposals by Liubimov to transplant important features of the German system of university education into Russia. In 1879, Count Dmitry Tolstoy abolished the professors' disciplinary courts, but the subsequent University Statute of 1884 proved unworkable and had to be repealed.

Guerrier was not considered an impressive public speaker. One writer has called him "prolix, fairly boring", contrasting him with a riveting performance by Kovalevsky.

Guerrier wrote in Russian, German, and French. His study of Mably and Jacobinism appeared in French in 1886 and was published in Paris, while a major work on Leibniz appeared in German. Critics have suggested that he turned to the French Revolution "to stigmatize opponents of the Russian monarchy".

Guerrier died in 1919 and is buried in Moscow at the Pyatnitskaya cemetery.

His daughter Elena Vladimirovna Guerrier (1868–1943), who became a schoolteacher, worked also as a translator.

== Higher Courses for Women ==
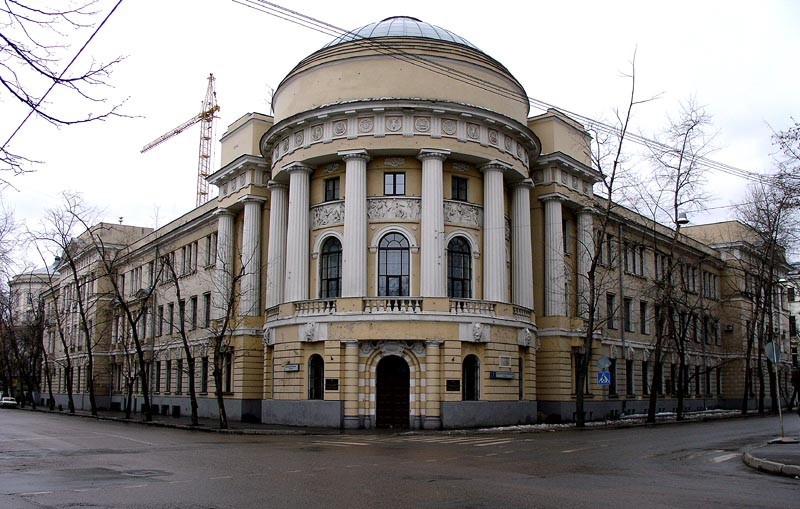
The Second Moscow State University

In Moscow, in 1872, with the consent of Count Dmitry Tolstoy, the Russian Minister of Education, Guerrier founded the Higher Courses for Women (vysshie zhenskie kursy, or "Courses Guerrier"), and headed them until 1905. In his lifetime, the courses developed into the Second Moscow State University.

Guerrier's concern for the education of women was primarily with training good conversationalists, mothers, and schoolteachers, and he advised one new class to avoid politics. He showed a paternalistic attitude towards women, long after they had shown they could master university-level courses. However, after Tolstoy had refused to give graduates of the courses teaching rights, in 1876 and 1877 Guerrier petitioned the minister to change his mind, arguing that a growing number of unmarried women were without families to support them, so that there was an economic imperative for employment rights for such women.

At one point there was controversy about Guerrier among the kursistki, as the female students were known. The cry went up "Let's catcall Guerrier!" after it had been alleged that as director of the Higher Courses he had treated women "like an Oriental despot". This charge, described in Guerrier's defence as "an absurd and malicious slander", caused a bitter division between two rival groups of women known as the 'politicians' and the 'academics'.

== Political life ==
By his own account, during his student years Guerrier was a radical, but he began his academic career as a liberal. After the assassination of Alexander II on 13 March [O.S. 1 March] 1881, he became a conservative, with the German historian Hecker calling him "a conservative-liberal Westernizer". In 1905, he joined the Octobrists.

In the 1870s, Russian liberals like Guerrier and Chicherin accused Karl Marx of being narrowly concerned with the proletariat and indifferent to the entrepreneur's more important "psychic labour".

From 1876 Guerrier was active in the Moscow City Duma, making social welfare his special field of expertise. He was seen as a member of the "educated" group of members, and on one occasion remarked witheringly on the petty bourgeois members' habits of "bowing humbly to eminent merchants", "preferring silence in debates", and "voting as their leaders told them". He was a member of the Grot Commission on help for the destitute and a founder of 'Guardianship of Work Relief'. In 1894 he was elected to chair a committee responsible for the welfare of the poor.

In 1903, Guerrier and a colleague named Popov, as members of the City Duma, proposed that binding regulations were needed to control the exploitation of waiters and other catering staff by their employers.

After the Russian Constitution of 1906 came into effect, six members of the State Council of Imperial Russia were to be elected to it by the Russian Academy of Sciences, and Guerrier was one of those the Academy appointed that year.

== Selected publications ==
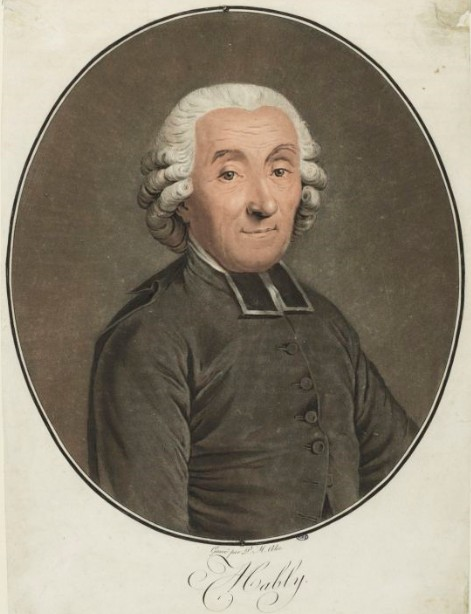
The Abbé de Mably (Musée de la Révolution française)

- Essay on the development of historical science (1866)
- St Willigis, Officium et miracula Sancti Willigisi, ed. V. I. Guerrier (J. Deubner, 1869)
- Leibniz in seinen Beziehungen zu Russland und Peter dem Grossen (St Petersburg, 1873)
- Die Kronprinzessin Charlotte von Rußland: Schwiegertochter Peters des Großen nach ihren noch ungedruckten Briefen 1707–1715 (Bonn, 1875)
- L'Abbé de Mably moraliste et politique: Étude sur la doctrine morale du Jacobinisme puritain et sur le développement de l'esprit républicain au XVIIIe siècle (Paris, 1886)
- «Понятие о власти и народе в наказах 1789 г.» (The concept of the government and people in the Mandate in 1789) (1884)
- «Идея народовластия накануне революции 1789 г.» (The idea of democracy before the Revolution of 1789)
- «Зодчие и подвижники Божьего царства» (Architects and devotees of God's kingdom)
- «Блаженный Августин» (St Augustine)
- «Апостол нищеты и любви Франциск из Ассизи» (Apostle of poverty and love, Francis of Assisi)
- «Французская Революция в освещении Тэна» (The French Revolution in the light of Taine)
- «Первая Государственная дума» (The First State Duma)
- «Вторая Государственная дума» (The Second State Duma) (Moscow, 1907
- «Второе раскрепощение — закон 9 ноября 1906 г» (The second liberation - the law of 9 November 1906)
- «Значение третьей Думы в Истории России» (The significance of the third Duma in Russia's History) (1912)
- «Речь об Александре и Наполеоне в 1812 г» (Between Alexander and Napoleon in 1812)

== Bibliography ==
- A. Andreev; D. Tsygankov, eds. (2010). Imperial Moscow University: 1755-1917: encyclopedic dictionary. Moscow: Russian political encyclopedia (ROSSPEN). pp. 157–161. ISBN 978-5-8243-1429-8.
