= Sergey Nametkin =

Russian chemist (1876–1950)

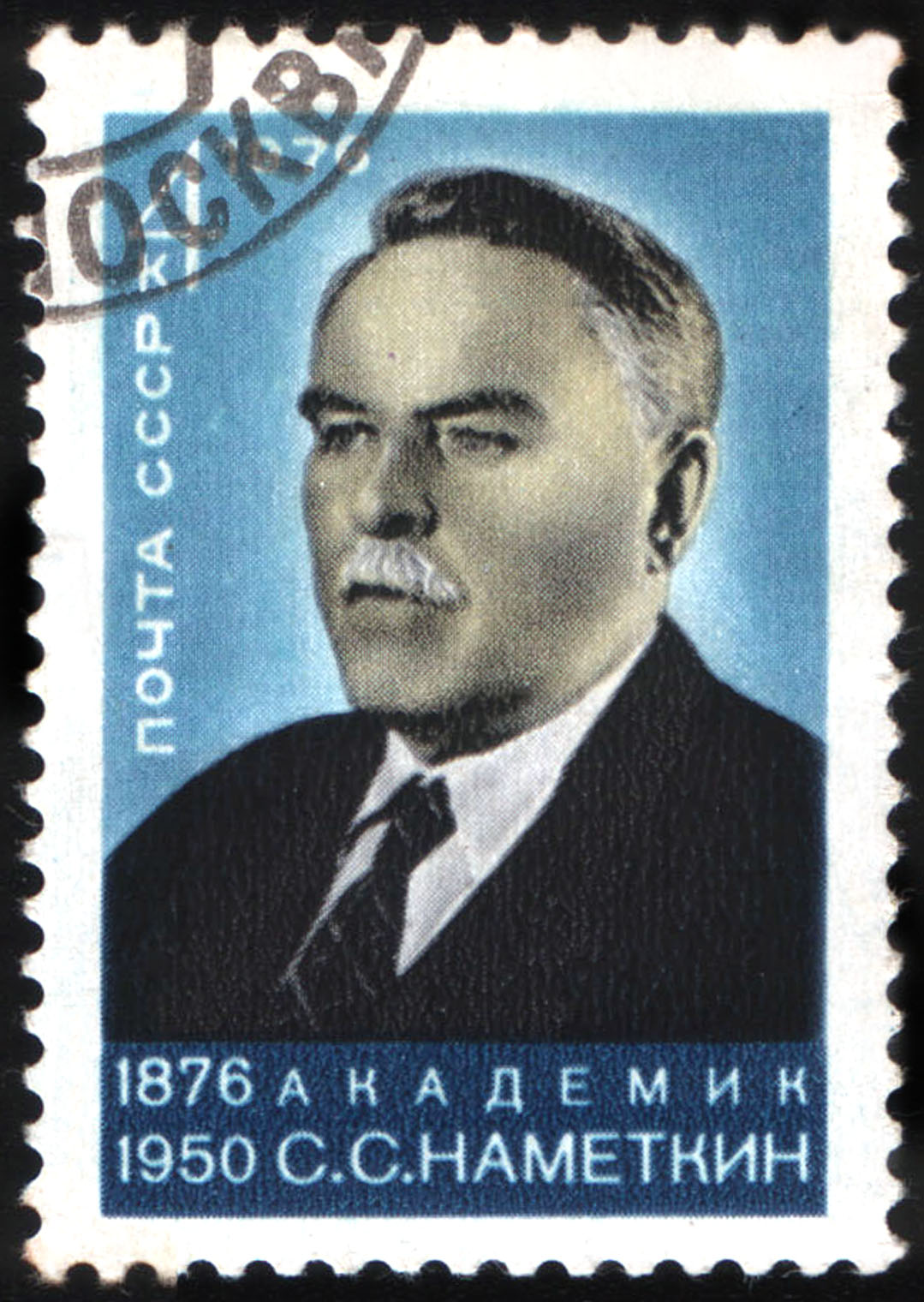
- Image of Nametkin on a 1973 stamp
- Born: Sergey Semyonovich Nametkin; July 3, 1876; Kazan Governorate, Russian Empire
- Died: August 5, 1950 (aged 74); Moscow, RSFSR, Soviet Union
- Education: Moscow State University
- Children: Nikolay Namyotkin; Alexey Lyapunov (stepson)
- Awards: USSR State Prize (1943, 1949); Order of Lenin (1946); Order of the Red Banner of Labour (1940, 1944, 1945)
- Scientific career
- Fields: Chemistry
- Thesis: Research on bicyclic compounds (1917) (1917)
- Academic advisors: Nikolay Zelinsky

Sergey Semyonovich Nametkin (Russian: Сергей Семёнович Намёткин; 3 July [O.S. 21 June] 1876 – 5 August 1950) was a Soviet and Russian organic chemist, a prominent researcher in terpene chemistry, the cracking of petrochemicals, and rearrangement of camphenes. Academician of the USSR Academy of Sciences. Winner of two Stalin Prizes.

== Biography ==
Nametkin was born into a merchant family in the village of Kaymary, Kazan Uyezd, Kazan Governorate. He received his primary education at the first Progymnasium in Kazan. In 1886, the family moved to Moscow, and soon, at the age of 12, Sergei Nametkin was left an orphan. In 1892 he graduated from the second Moscow Progymnasium, and in 1896 – from the first Moscow Men's Gymnasium. During his high school years, he earned his living by giving private lessons.

In 1896-1902 he studied at the Faculty of Physics and Mathematics of the Imperial Moscow University (soon after entering the mathematics department, in 1897 he changed it to the department of natural sciences), from which he graduated with a first-degree diploma. After graduating from the university, he was left at the department of analytical and organic chemistry “to prepare for a professorship”, where he carried out his first experimental work (preparation of pure cyclohexane, synthesis of methylcyclopentane, etc.) under Professor N. D. Zelinsky guidance. Since 1905, he has worked at the department as a supernumerary laboratory assistant, helping the professor conduct practical classes in qualitative analysis and organic chemistry. Since 1910, Nametkin combined teaching at the university with work at the Moscow Higher Women Courses (Moskovskie vysshie zhenskie kursy – MVZhK), where he was invited as an assistant in the department of organic chemistry.

In 1911, Nametkin, together with a group of professors and teachers, left the Imperial Moscow University in protest against the policy of the Minister of National Education L. A. Kasso. From now on, his work was mainly associated with the MVZhK. In the very same 1911, he successfully defended his master’s thesis at the Saint Petersburg Imperial University, “On the question of the effect of nitric acid on saturated hydrocarbons,” and in 1912, on the recommendation of N. D. Zelinsky, he was elected professor of the MVZhK in the Department of Organic Chemistry. From 1914 to 1918 Nametkin held the positions of secretary and dean of the Faculty of Physics and Mathematics of the MVZhK.

In March 1917, he defended his doctoral thesis on the topic: “Research on bicyclic compounds” (Issledovania iz oblasti bitsiklicheskikh soedineny) and returned to Moscow University, where he began to teach a special course called “Chemistry of alicyclic compounds and essential oils”, and later a course in organic chemistry.

== Second Moscow State University ==
Since 1918, he has worked at the second Moscow State University, created on the basis of the MVZhK:

- Professor, head of the department of organic chemistry (1918-1930)
- Dean of the Faculty of Physics and Mathematics (1918-1919)
- Rector (1919-1924)

In 1919, a large-scale reorganization of the Moscow higher school was carried out, as a result of which the second Moscow State University lost most of its faculties and the rector, Professor S. A. Chaplygin. On October 16, 1919, he was replaced by S. S. Nametkin, first as acting rector and, from May 1920, as rector of the second Moscow State University.

During his years as rector, Nametkin was forced to solve the problem of restoring the normal functioning of the university after the removal of leading faculties and specialties from its composition (they had been transferred to the first Moscow State University). This task was solved to a large extent thanks to the opening in 1921 of the first pedagogical faculty in Moscow within the walls of the second Moscow State University. In 1924, Nametkin, due to being too busy, which did not allow him to fully engage in scientific research, left the rector’s position, continuing to work at the second Moscow State University as a professor.

== State Petroleum Research Institute under the Supreme Soviet of the National Economy ==
- Head of the Department of Chemistry and Technology (1925-1928)
- Deputy Director (1926-1934)

In 1925, the State Petroleum Research Institute was created at the Supreme Soviet of the National Economy of the USSR, in which Nametkin simultaneously worked as a teacher at the second Moscow State University, head of the department of chemistry and technology. The department he headed carried out studies on the chemical composition of oil and gas in the USSR, paraffins and ceresins. In 1926, Nametkin became deputy director in scientific work of the I. M. Gubkin Institute.

== Mining Academy ==
In 1927, S. S. Nametkin headed the organized department of organic chemistry and petroleum chemistry at the Petroleum Faculty of the Moscow Mining Academy. In this department, he first began teaching a course in petroleum chemistry.

== Moscow State University of Fine Chemical Technologies (MITHT) ==
Since 1930, Nametkin became one of the leading professors at MITHT, created on the basis of the chemical faculty of the second Moscow State University. He worked at MITHT until 1938, when he moved to Moscow University, to the Faculty of Chemistry, where he headed the Department of Organic Chemistry.

== USSR Academy of Sciences ==
- Corresponding Member of the USSR Academy of Sciences (elected March 29, 1932)
- Full member of the USSR Academy of Sciences (elected on January 29, 1939)
- Head of the laboratory of petroleum chemistry at the Fossil Fuels Institute of the USSR Academy of Sciences (later Institute of Petroleum of the USSR Academy of Sciences (1934-1950)
- Director of the Institute of Fossil Fuels of the USSR Academy of Sciences (1939-1947)
- Chairman of the Presidium of the Azerbaijan Branch of the USSR Academy of Sciences (1940-1943)
- Director of the Institute of Petroleum of the USSR Academy of Sciences (1948-1950)

Nametkin, simultaneously with his work in higher educational institutions, from the mid-1930s, devoted more and more time to scientific institutes. The Oil Institute, of which he was deputy director, in 1934 became part of the newly created Institute of Fossil Fuels (Institut gorjuchih iskopaemyh – IGI) of the USSR Academy of Sciences. At this institute, he organized a laboratory for petroleum chemistry, which he directed until his death. The primary focus of the laboratory's work was the study of the chemical composition of oil from various fields. Much attention was also paid to the thermal and catalytic transformations of hydrocarbons.

In 1939, after the death of the founder of IGI I. M. Gubkin, he was appointed director of the institute, retaining the leadership of the laboratory. Work continued during WWII, when IGI was evacuated to Kazan. Nametkin’s laboratory analyzed captured fuel and lubricating oils and developed new types of them. During the war, Nametkin also headed the oil section of the Academy of Sciences committee for the mobilization of resources of the Middle Volga and Kama regions for the defense needs of the USSR. Under his leadership, a method for producing lubricating oils from sulfurous oils was developed and implemented at the Ishimbay oil refinery plant.

On July 10, 1941, Nametkin became a member of the Scientific and Technical Council for the development and testing of scientific works in chemistry related to defense topics, chaired by the authorized State Defense Committee, Professor S. V. Kaftanov.

In 1947, Nametkin’s laboratory was transferred to the Petroleum Institute of the USSR Academy of Sciences, that was separated from IGI. In 1948, Nametkin was appointed director of the Petroleum Institute and held this position until his death in the summer of 1950.

== Public authorities ==
- Member of the Council of Scientific and Technical Expertise of the USSR State Planning Committee (Gosplan) (1940-1950)
- Member of the Main Directorate for Higher School Affairs under the Council of People's Commissars of the USSR
- Member of the Higher Attestation Commission (HAC) under the Ministry of Higher Education of the USSR
- Chairman of the Commission on Motor Fuel and Lubricating Oils under the Presidium of the USSR Academy of Sciences

== Social activity ==
Nametkin was a member of the oldest scientific society of Moscow University, the Moscow Society of Naturalists.

In 1932 he headed the All-Union Chemical Society named after D.I. Mendeleev, formed on the basis of the pre-revolutionary Russian Physico-Chemical Society.

Member of the editorial board of the Journal of General Chemistry (Zhurnal obschej himii)

S. S. Nametkin died on August 5, 1950. He was buried in Moscow at the Novodevichy Cemetery (site No. 3).

== Research ==
Nametkin’s main area of scientific interest, petroleum chemistry, has already become apparent in his student years. Graduation thesis (Imperial Moscow University, 1902): “Hydrocarbons of Caucasian oil, their properties and chemical reactions”; master's thesis (defended at the St. Petersburg Imperial University, 1911): “On the question of the effect of nitric acid on saturated hydrocarbons”; doctoral dissertation (defended at the Petrograd Imperial University, 1916): “Research on bicyclic compounds” (through nitration using the Konovalov reaction, he established the structure of many bicyclic hydrocarbons).

In the 1910s, he conducted research on terpenes, the constituent components of essential oils. Experts consider Nametkin’s research on the series of camphene and its derivatives to be the most significant. Many years of research into the reactions of camphene subsequently led to the discovery of a new structural rearrangement called the “Nametkin rearrangement” (discovered in 1925 together with L. Ya. Bryusova), which made it possible to explain many transformations in the chemistry of camphor and its derivatives. The shift of the ring bond is actually a standard Wagner-Meerwein rearrangement. The reaction can, in fact, be used to make the terpene employing chlorocamphene.

Between the 1910s and early 1920s, the focus of S. S. Nametkin’s attention was on general theoretical problems of organic chemistry. From the second half of the 1920s, scientific and practical issues related to the chemistry of oil were put at the forefront. Since 1927, he was the first in Russia to teach a systematic course in petroleum chemistry, on the basis of which the two-volume monograph “Petroleum Chemistry” (1932-1935) was written. Nametkin studied the composition and properties of oil and gas from various fields of the country, developed approaches to solving the problems of petrochemical synthesis, in particular the oxidation of paraffin into alcohols and aldehydes and the production of detergents. He also conducted work in the field of the synthesis of aroma compounds and growth stimulants.

In 1936, he discovered the reaction of catalytic hydropolymerization of unsaturated hydrocarbons.

Contemporaries noted S. S. Nametkin’s exceptional persistence in achieving his goals and the enormous patience with which he carried out countless series of experiments to achieve the desired result. In the memoirs about him, there is a phrase: “Nametkin does it slowly, but forever.”

With the active participation of S. S. Nametkin, the journal “Oil industry” (Neftjanoe hozjajstvo) was created.

== Bibliography ==
S. S. Nametkin wrote more than 1000 scientific works, including:

- Untersuchungen auf dem Gebiete der Campher und Camphenilonreihe / Von S. Nametkin. — Leipzig; Berlin: Chemie, 1923.
- Die Umlagerung alizyklischer: Kerne ineinander / Von Prof. Dr. S. Nametkin. — Stuttgart: Enke, 1925. — 34 с.
- Uber einen neuen bicyclichen, zweifach ungesattigten Kohlenwasserstoff Isocamphodien und sein Hydratationsprodukt Bornylend / S. Nametkin, Antonina Zabrodin. — Berlin: Chemie, 1928.
- Химия нефти. Ч. 1—2. — М.-Л.: Гос. науч.-техн. нефт. изд-во, 1932—1935 (2-е изд.: М.—Л., 1939; 3-е изд.: М.: Изд-во Акад. наук СССР, 1955. — 800 с.).
- Химия в Московском университете за 185 лет // «Успехи химии». — 1940. — № 9, вып. 6.
- Масла из ишимбаевской нефти // Известия Академия наук СССР. Отделение технических наук. — 1942. — № 9 (соавт.);
- Анализ сернистых соединений лёгких погонов нефти: (критика существующих методов) // Известия Академия наук СССР. Отделение технических наук. — 1943. — № 1—2 (соавт.).
- Ştiinţa petrolului în epoca stalinistă / De acad. S. S. Nameotchin; Acad. Republicii Populăre Române. — [Bucureşti], 1950. — 21 с.
- Собрание трудов. Т. 1—3. — М.: Изд-во Акад. наук СССР, 1954—1955.
- Исследования в области органической химии и химии нефти. — М.: Наука, 1979. — 319 с.
- Гетероциклические соединения. — М., 1981.

== Honors and awards ==
- Small Prize of A. M. Butlerov of the Russian Physico-Chemical Society (1910) – for the work “On the question of the effect of nitric acid on saturated hydrocarbons.”
- Stalin Prize of the first degree (1943) – for many years of work in the field of science and technology
- Stalin Prize of the second degree (1949) – for the development and introduction into production of a new method for the synthesis of fragrant substances
- Order of Lenin (07/2/1946)
- Three Orders of the Red Banner of Labour (1940; 1944; 1945)
- Medal "For Valiant Labour in the Great Patriotic War 1941-1945" (1946)
- Honored Science and Technology Figure of the RSFSR (1947)

== Family ==
He was married to Lydia Nikolaevna Lyapunova (Nametkina), sister of the railway engineer Andrei Nikolaevich Lyapunov (1880-1923). From this marriage, two children were born. The families of A. N. Lyapunov and S. S. Nametkin lived under one roof, raising two children of the Nametkins and seven children of the Lyapunovs together. In 1923, A. N. Lyapunov died; a year later, in 1924, L. N. Nametkina. In 1927, Sergei Semenovich married the widow of A. N. Lyapunov, Elena Vasilievna Lyapunova (1887-1976), adopting her children.

S. S. Nametkin’s son from his first marriage, Nikolai Sergeevich Nametkin (1916-1984), followed in his father’s footsteps, also choosing the profession of chemist and achieving success in it.

The adopted son of S. S. Nametkin, Alexey Andreevich Lyapunov (1911-1973), became an outstanding mathematician and one of the founders of cybernetics.

== Commemorations ==
Streets in Moscow (1965), Kazan, Donetsk, and Baku are named after S. S. Nametkin. Until 2018, the head office of OJSC Gazprom was located on Nametkina Street in Moscow.

Since 1995, the Russian State University of Oil and Gas, named after I. M. Gubkin, has had a scholarship named after S. S. Nametkin.

At the Institute of Petrochemical Synthesis, named after A. V. Topchiev, RAS there is a memorial office of academician S. S. Nametkin.

In 1988, the research vessel “Akademik Nametkin” came into operation in the USSR (from 1997 to 2018 it had a different name).

== Literature ==
- Волков В. А., Куликова М. В. Московские профессора XVIII — начала XX веков. Естественные и технические науки. — М.: Янус-К; Московские учебники и картолитография, 2003. — С. 166. — 294 с. — 2000 экз. — ISBN 5-8037-0164-5
- Лисичкин Г. В. Сергей Семенович Наметкин // Лисичкин Г. В. Выдающиеся деятели отечественной нефтяной науки и техники. — М., 1967.
- Ректоры МПГУ. 1872—2000. Очерки. — М., 2000.
- Сергей Семенович Намёткин // АН СССР. Материалы к биобиблиографии ученых СССР. Сер. химических наук. Вып. 2. — М.-Л., 1946.
- Сергей Семенович Наметкин. 1876—1950. (Материалы к биобиблиографии ученых СССР). 2-е изд. — М.: «Наука», 1990.
- Сергей Семенович Намёткин. По воспоминаниям современников. — М., 1982.
- Топчиев А. В., Сергиенко С. Р., Санин П. И. Выдающийся советский ученый С. С. Наметкин // Труды по истории техники. Вып. 3. — М., 1953.
- Московский университет в Великой Отечественной войне. — 4-е, переработанное и дополненное. — М.: Издательство Московского университета, 2020. — С. 15, 110, 111, 115, 117, 123, 124, 443. — 632 с. — 1000 экз. — ISBN 978-5-19-011499-7
