= Polyxena Solovyova =

- Поликсена Соловьёва
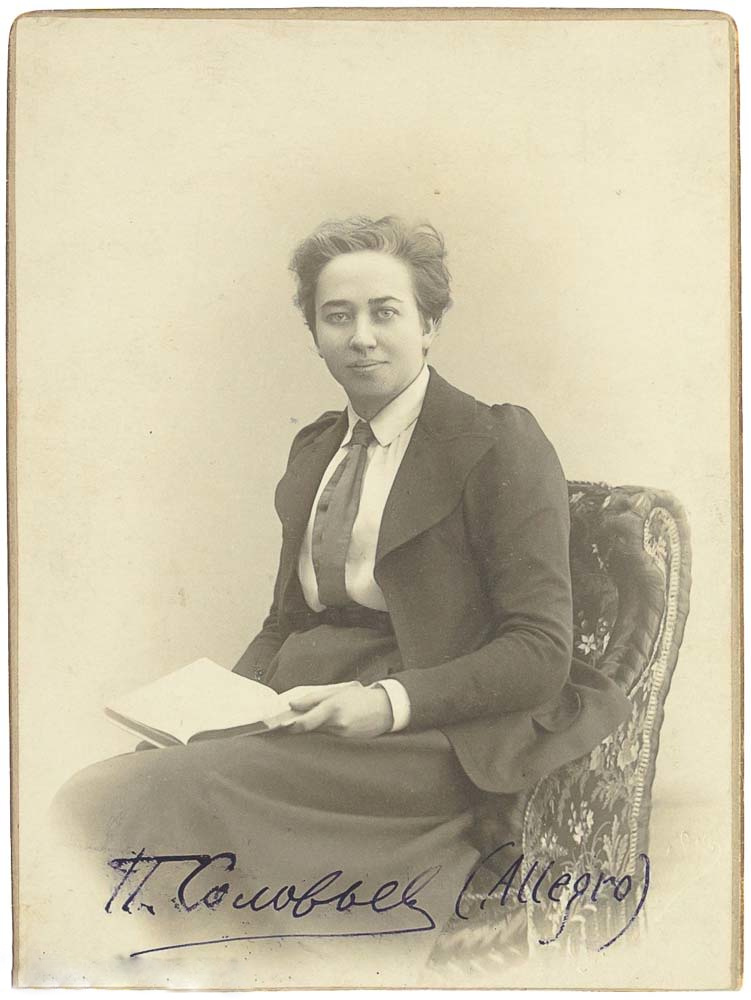
- Solovyova, c. 1900
- Born: Polyxena Sergeyevna Solovyova; 20 March 1867; Moscow, Russia
- Died: 16 August 1924 (aged 57); Moscow, Soviet Union
- Other names: Poliksena Soloviova, Poliksena Sergeevna Solov'eva
- Occupations: writer, artist
- Years active: 1883–1924
- Father: Sergey Solovyov
- Relatives: Vsevolod Solovyov (brother); Vladimir Solovyov (brother)

Polyxena Sergeyevna Solovyova (Russian: Поликсена Сергеевна Соловьёва, romanized: Poliksena Sergeyevna Solovyova; 1 April [O.S. 20 March] 1867 – 16 August 1924) was a Russian poet and illustrator. A Symbolist poet from the Silver Age of Russian Poetry, she won the Medal of Pushkin in 1908. She was the first person to translate Alice in Wonderland into the Russian language and was known for founding and illustrating the magazine and publishing house Тропинка ("Path") with her partner, Natalia Manaseina.

== Early life ==
Polyxena Sergeyevna Solovyova was born on 20 March 1867 O.S. in Moscow to Polyxena Vladimirovna (née Romanova) and Sergey Solovyov. Her father was a noted historian and the rector of the University of Moscow. Her mother was from a Polish-Ukrainian family, who were related to the philosopher Gregory Skovoroda. Her paternal grandfather was Mikhail Vasilievich Solovyov, who had been a priest and law instructor. She was the youngest of 12 children, which included her brothers Vsevolod Solovyov and Vladimir. Her education began at home and she was able to read and write by age 5. After reading a poetry collection by Afanasy Fet, she began writing poetry. Later, she attended the Moscow School of Painting, Sculpture and Architecture, studying under Vasily Polenov and Illarion Pryanishnikov.

== Career ==
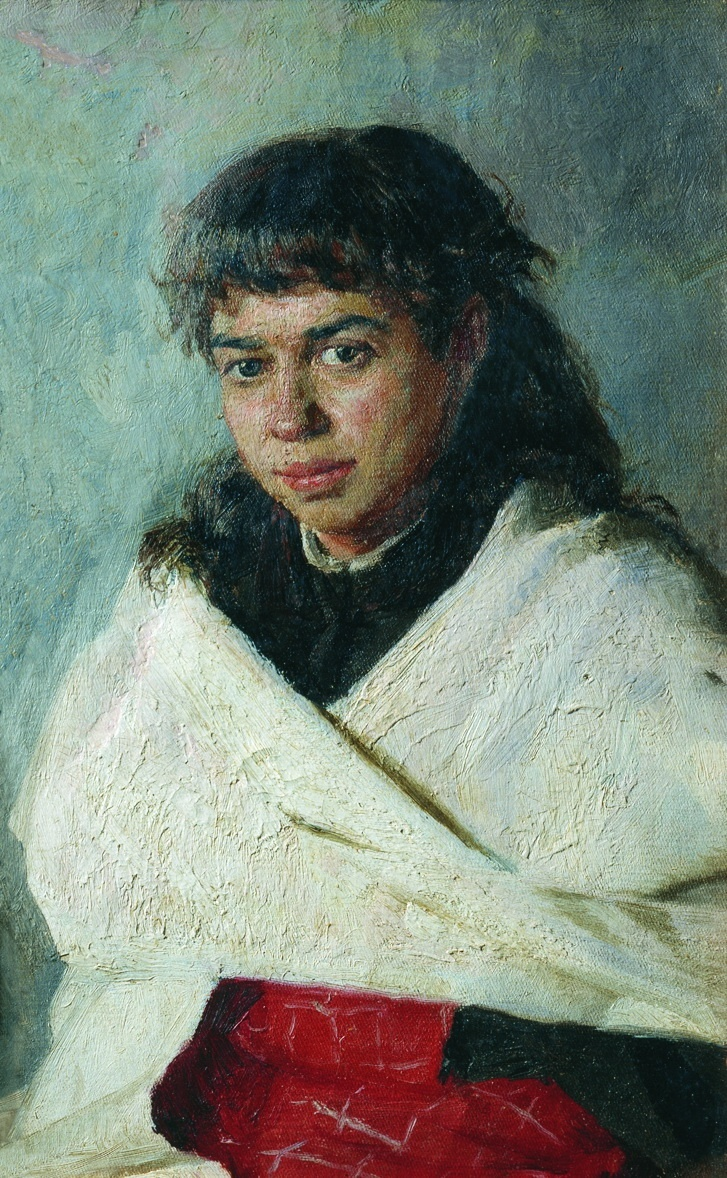
Polyxena Solovyova in 1885, painting by Nikolai Yaroshenko.

Solovyova began publishing poetry at the age of 16 with her first publication in the journal Нива (The Field). She moved to Saint Petersburg in 1895, becoming involved with the literary circle which included Konstantin Balmont, Alexander Blok, Zinaida Gippius, Vyacheslav Ivanov, and Konstantin Sluchevsky, among other Symbolist poets. In 1898, at a gathering of Symbolist poets in the home of Mikhail Petrovich Manasein, a professor at the Imperial Military Medical Academy, Solovyova met him and his wife, Natalia. In 1899, when she published her first volume of poetry, which she also illustrated, called Стихотворения (Poems), she began using the pseudonym Allegro. She also published poetry in magazines like Вестник Европы (European Herald), Мир Божий (God's World), and Русское богатство (Russian Wealth). By around 1901, Solovyova met the sisters, Adelaida and Eugenia Gertsyk and also around 1903 became acquainted with the poet Maximilian Voloshin. From around 1906, she began summering in Koktebel, in the Crimea with the Gertsyk sisters, who headed a literary salon which included Voloshin and the Manaseins.

In 1906, Solovyova founded the publishing house and children's magazine Тропинка (Path), where she worked as an editor, illustrator, and writer along with Manaseina. Both she and the publishing house were awarded the Pushkin Gold Medal in 1908. She personally published over twenty books while running Тропинка, including many translations of noted literary works for children. She was the first to translate Alice in Wonderland into Russian, which she published as Приключения Алисы в Стране чудес in 1909. The publication also became widely used by other Symbolist poets as an outlet for their creative works. It was a significant publishing house in the period, publishing around 100 books by 1918, for which more than half were for the Ministry of Education.

In addition to writing and translating, Solovyova published many drawings for the magazine. Her works represent a wide range of styles, from imitations of children's sketches to Art Nouveau graphics. She also solicited drawings from other artists to enhance the layout of the magazine. Though she often followed in the Symbolist tradition, Solovyova also wrote in other genres, writing lullabies, religious legends, riddles and poems about nature and animals. One of these was a stage drama, Svadba solntsa i vesny (The Wedding of the Sun and the Spring) written in 1907 in celebration of spring. Music for the piece was written by Mikhail Kuzmin.

Solovyova and Manaseina began an affair, and beginning 1909, they lived with Natalia's husband in the same house at #16 Voznesensky in Saint Petersburg. In 1917, the three lived in voluntary exile in Crimea to avoid the violence of the Russian Revolution in the capital. While living in the Crimea, she continued to write, but her works only occasionally managed to make it into the newspapers and journals in Simferopol or Feodosia. She taught for the Feodosia Department of Education and gave lectures in Koktebel at the People's University. To earn a living, she and Manaseina created and sold hats. At the end of 1923, with the help of friends Korney Chukovsky and Voloshin, Solovyova and Manaseina were able to return to Moscow. Solovyova was ill and almost immediately underwent an operation, but her health continued to decline.

== Death and legacy ==
Solovyova died on 16 August 1924 in Moscow and was buried in the Novodevichy Cemetery. For many years, her contributions to Russian literature were lost and there was no mention of her in the Soviet period. She was reintroduced as a figure of Russia's Silver Age in 1999, when Tatyana Nikitichna Zhukovskaya and Elena Albertovna Kallo compiled a book, Sub Rosa for Ellis Lak publishing in 1999. The book included works of Solovyova, as well as Cherubina de Gabriak, Adelaida Gertsyk, and Sophia Parnok. In the twenty-first century, revived scholarship on her work has taken place.

== Selected works ==
=== Poetry ===
- 1899: Стихотворения (Poems)
- 1905: Иней (Frost)
- 1909: Плакун-трава (Willow-Grass)
- 1912: Тайная правда (Secret Truth)
- 1913: Перекресток (Crossroads)
- 1914: Вечер (Evening)
- 1924: Последние стихи (Last Poems)

=== Children's stories ===
- 1906: Yolka I osina (The Spruce and the Aspen)
- 1907: Yolka (The Christmas Tree)
- 1909: Priklyucheniya Alisy v strane chudes (translation of Alice in Wonderland)
- 1913: Krasnoe yaichko (The Red Egg)
