= Birshtein =

Birshtein is a surname. Notable people with the surname include:

- Boris Birshtein (born 1947), Lithuanian businessman
- Mary Birshtein (1900–1990), Soviet social scientist
- Tatiana Birshtein (1928–2022), Russian scientist
