= Eugenia Gertsyk =

Russian translator and memorialist (1878–1944)

- Born: Eugenia Kazimirovna Gertsyk; 12 October 1878; Alexandrov, Russian Empire
- Died: 20 January 1944 (aged 65); Zelenaya Steppe village, Kursk Oblast, USSR
- Other names: Evgenia Gercyk, Evgenia Kazimirovna Gertsyk, Evgeniya Gertsyk, Yevgenia Gertsyk, Evgenia Kazimirovna Gerzyk
- Occupations: writer, translator, memorialist
- Years active: 1901-1941

Eugenia Gertsyk (Russian: Евге́ния Казими́ровна Ге́рцык, 30 September 1878 O.S./12 October 1878 (N. S.)–20 January 1944) was a noted Russian translator and literary figure from the Silver Age. Since the demise of the USSR, she has become noted for her memoirs and extensive letter correspondence, which provides a unique glimpse into the interwar years of Russia's past.

== Early life ==
Eugenia Kazimirovna Gertsyk was born on 12 October 1878 in Alexandrov of the Vladimir Governorate in the Russian Empire to Sofia Maximilianovna (née Tidebel) (Russian: Софья Максимилиановна Тидебель) and Kasimir Antonovich Lubny-Gertsyk (Russian: Казимир Антонович Лубны-Герцык). Her father was descended of an impoverished Polish-Lithuanian noble family and worked as an engineer for the railroad, heading the construction of the Moscow-Yaroslavl line. Her paternal uncle, Joseph Antonovich Lubny-Gertsyk, built the Baranov Manufacturing plant in the Alexandrovsky District town of Karabanovo. Her paternal aunt, Elena Antonovna Lubny-Gertsyk was married to the painter Lev Lagorio. Her mother, who died when Gertsyk and her sister, Adelaida, were young children was of German and Swiss heritage, though the family was entirely Russified, they were Lutheran. After their mother's death in 1880, Gertsyk's father remarried Eugenia Antonovna Vokach (Russian: Евгении Антоновны Вокач) and a half-brother Vladimir was born in 1885.

Because of the nature of her father's work, Gertsyk grew up moving often, as her father constructed the rail line. After her birth in Alexandrov, they lived in Moscow then back to Alexandrov, and later Sevastopol and Yuriev-Polsky. All the children received a broad early education from tutors and governesses, which included the study of five languages encompassing English, French, German, Italian and Polish. They also traveled to Europe to experience diverse cultures during their childhood. Gertsyk went on to further her education studying history and philosophy entering the Bestuzhev Courses in 1901, from which she graduated with honors in 1905.

== Career ==
Gertsyk began her career as a translator, working on translations of writers such as Edward Carpenter, Joris-Karl Huysmans, William James, and Friedrich Nietzsche, among others. She also wrote translations with her sister, of the works of Jean-Marie Guyau, Immanuel Kant, and Nietzsche. She published critical essays and articles, like Бесоискательство в тихом омуте (Unclaimed in a Quiet Pool), published in 1906 in Golden Fleece magazine about Dmitri Merezhkovsky. In 1906 and again in 1913, she traveled to Rome, describing her impressions in the essay My Rome. The second trip was made after her conversion from Lutheranism to Russian Orthodoxy in 1911. She became a close friend of the poet, Vyacheslav Ivanov, defending his classicist style against more modern trends in Russian literature and wrote an article Религия страдающего Бога (The Religion of the Suffering God) about him.

Between 1915 and 1917, she lived with her sister Adelaida at her home in Moscow. During the Russian Revolution the entire family, including her brother, Vladimir and his family, lived in Sudak. The intellectual community living in the Crimea included such people as the actress Lyudmila Erarskaya, poet Sophia Parnok, composer and musician Alexander Spendiarov, the poet Maximilian Voloshin, and the threesome, Polyxena Solovyova, her partner, Natalia Manaseina, and Manaseina's husband Mikhail. As a group, the intellectual community worked on productions for their own entertainment. Parnok and both Gertsyk sisters wrote verse, Spendiarov wrote songs, and Erarskaya staged plays, Parnok viewed Gertsyk as a spiritual mother, someone who was helping her mature in her devotion. Letters exchanged with other intellectuals like Nikolai Berdyaev, who called her the "most remarkable woman of the twentieth century", and Lydia Berdyaev reflect her philosophical nature and quest to understand man's place in the universe.

The family home in Moscow was nationalized during the war, forcing the Gertsyk clan to remain in Crimea, despite the desperate conditions and famines. Her sister died in Sudak in 1925 and the following year, Adelaide's husband Dmitry Evgenievich Zhukovsky was banished to the Vologda Oblast. In 1927, Gertsyk, along with Vladimir, his invalid wife Lyubov Aleksandrovna, and their daughter Veronika moved to the Caucasus. Gertsyk provided the constant care and nursing needed by Lyubov Aleksandrovna, who had polyarthritis, and helped with raising her niece. They lived in various places, such as Kislovodsk, where they remained for eleven years. Then they briefly lived in Zelenchuk and Batalpashinsk, before moving to the Central Chernozem Reserve. Around this same time, Gertsyk began to write her memoirs in 1936 and continued her wide correspondence with many Russian émigrés. In 1941, the reserve was evacuated and the family moved to the small village of Zelenaya Steppe. During the Nazi Occupation, which lasted from 1941 to 1943 her sister-in-law died and Gertsyk finished her memoirs.

== Death and legacy ==
Gertsyk died on 20 January 1944 at a farm in the village of Zelenaya Steppe in the Kursk Oblast. During her lifetime, Gertsyk was known for her translations and intellectual salons. She is most known today for her various memoirs and letter collections which have been published and give a unique perspective on life in the interwar period. A part of her letter exchange with Vera Grinevich is housed in Alexander Solzhenitsyn's House of Russians Abroad.

== Works ==
- Герцык, Евгения (1973). Жуковской, Татьяна Никитична (ed.). Воспоминания [Memoirs] (in Russian). Paris, France: YMCA Press. OCLC 490046355.
- Герцык, Евгения (2007). Жуковской, Татьяна Никитична (ed.). Лики и образы [Faces and Images] (in Russian). Moscow, Russia: Молодая гвардия. ISBN 978-5-235-03006-0.
- Герцык, Евгения (2011). Котенко, М.А.; Жуковской, Т. Н. (introduction) (eds.). Перекличка через "железный занавес": Письма Е.Герцык, В.Гриневич, Л.Бердяевой... [Roll call through the "Iron Curtain": Letters from Eugenia Gertsyk to Vera Stepanovna Grinevich, Lydia Yudifovna Berdyaev, et al.] (in Russian). Moscow, Russia: Дом русского зарубежья им. Александра Солженицына. ISBN 978-5-98854-032-8.
