= Adelaida Gertsyk =

Russian translator, poet and writer (1874–1925)

- left to right: Dmitry Zhukovsky, Adelaida Gertsyk and Eugenia Gertsyk, 5 February 1909
- Born: Adelaida Kazimirovna Gertsyk; 16 February 1874; Alexandrov, Russian Empire
- Died: 25 June 1925 (aged 51); Sudak, USSR
- Other names: Adelaide Gertzyk, Adelaida Zhukovsky-Gertsyk, Adelaide Gercyk, pseudonym: V. Syrin
- Occupation: writer
- Years active: 1899-1925

Adelaida Gertsyk (Russian: Аделаида Казимировна Герцык, 16 February 1874 – 25 June 1925) was a Russian translator, poet and writer of the Silver Age. Her literary salons of the 19th and early 20th century brought many of the poets of the age together. Almost forgotten after her lifetime, scholarship renewed on Gertsyk at the end of the Soviet era and she is now deemed one of the significant poets of her age.

== Early life ==
Adelaida Kazimirovna Gertsyk was born on 16 February 1874 in Alexandrov of the Moscow Governorate in the Russian Empire to Sofia Maximilianovna (née Tidebel) (Russian: Софья Максимилиановна Тидебель) and Kasimir Antonovich Lubny-Gertsyk (Russian: Казимир Антонович Лубны-Герцык). Her father was descended of an impoverished Polish-Lithuanian noble family and worked as an engineer for the railroad, heading the construction of the Moscow-Yaroslavl line. Her paternal uncle, Joseph Antonovich Lubny-Gertsyk, built the Baranov Manufacturing plant in the Alexandrovsky District town of Karabanovo. Her paternal aunt, Elena Antonovna Lubny-Gertsyk was married to the painter Lev Lagorio. Her mother, who died when Gertsyk and her sister, Eugenia, were young children was of German and Swiss heritage, though the family was entirely Russified, they were Lutheran. After their mother's death in 1880, Gertsyk's father remarried Eugenia Antonovna Vokach (Russian: Евгении Антоновны Вокач) and a half-brother Vladimir was born in 1885.

Because of the nature of her father's work, Gertsyk grew up moving often, as her father constructed the rail line. After her birth in Alexandrov, they lived in Moscow then back to Alexandrov, and later Sevastopol and Yuriev-Polsky. All the children received a broad early education from by tutors and governesses, which included the study of five languages encompassing Polish and Italian, among others. They also traveled to Europe to experience diverse cultures during their childhood. Continuing her education, she was prepared for gymnasium following the curriculum of the Moscow Nobles Boarding School (ru) by the poet, M. A. Carlin (Russian: М. А. Карлин), from whom she developed a passion for writing. Gertsyk studied at the Moscow Women's Gymnasium and after graduating, studied art history, literature and philosophy on her own.

== Career ==
Fascinated by Russian folklore, Gertsyk taught the subject in a school in Tsarskoe Selo as well as at her family's estate in the Crimea. Her first works were translations which she began publishing in 1899. These included works by Alfred de Musset, Selma Lagerlöf, Friedrich Nietzsche, John Ruskin, and others. She also produced translations with her sister, Eugenia and began writing poetry during her relationship with Alexander Bobrychev-Pushkin, a married lawyer and poet. He was much older than she, but their relationship inspired her to write and influenced her later works. He died suddenly in 1903 and as a result of the shock, Gertsyk partially lost her hearing. Beginning in 1905, she worked as a collaborator on the journal Libra, publishing critiques and reviews of new books under the pseudonym V. Syrin. 1906 she published an essay Из мира детских игр (From the world of Children's Games), which was an acclaimed introspection. Her first significant publication of her own poems appeared in the almanac of the Symbolists known as Flower Garden of First Ashes that same year, as the cycle Golden Key. The poems depict philosophical and religious symbols with references to folkloric myth. She gained praise for the works from such artists as Konstantin Balmont, Valery Bryusov, Vyacheslav Ivanov, Maximilian Voloshin, and others.

Around the same time as her publication, she spent the summer of 1908 at the family estate in Sudak and remained there until the first of October. Among the guests were Vyacheslav Ivanov, Anna Mintslova and Dmitry Evgenievich Zhukovsky. In January, 1909, in Paris, Gertsyk married Zhukovsky, a biologist, publisher, and translator of philosophical literature, who was a member of the Russian aristocracy and well-to-do. The poet Maximilian Voloshin served as the best man at the wedding. By the following August, their first child, Daniyl was born. In 1910, her collection Стихотворения (Poems) was published and earned responses from the same group of noted poets, which was unusual praise for a Russian woman. In 1911, she published an autobiographical novella, О том, чго не было (About That Which Never Was) in the journal Russian Thought. From 1910 to 1917, Gertsyk published in the journals "Северные записки" (Northern Notes), "Альманах Муз" (Muses' Almanac) among others pursuing aesthetic themes. The couple hosted literary salons which were widely attended by some of the most noted intellectuals of the day. She became friends with and was influenced by Sergei Bulgakov to convert from Lutheranism to Russian Orthodoxy. At one of these events in early 1911, Voloshin brought the young poet Marina Tsvetaeva. The two became steadfast friends and it would later be Gertsyk who introduced Tsvetaeva to Sophia Parnok in 1914. In 1913, she gave birth to her second son, Nikita. Following the autobiographical novella cycle, Gertsyk published two more, Мои романы (My Loves, 1913) and Мои блуждания (My Wanderings, 1915).

During the war years encompassing World War I and the Russian Civil War, the family lived in the Crimea, first staying in the home Gertsyk's father had built in 1880. As they had in Moscow, the couple hosted salons for members of the intelligentsia, which included their friends from Moscow, and others like Lyudmila Erarskaya, Parnok, Margarita Sabashnikova, Alexander Spendiaryan, as well as the threesome Polyxena Solovyova, her partner, Natalia Manaseina, and Manaseina's husband Mikhail. The group discussed literature and philosophy, staged performances and even published a literary newsletter. In 1914, as the older home needed renovations, the couple decided to build their own house in Sudak, which took two years to complete. They moved in in 1916, but did not enjoy it for long, as when the Red Terror reached the Crimea in 1920, their gatherings were banned. The famine seriously impacted her children, nearly killing them and then in January, 1921, Gertsyk was arrested. She spent three weeks imprisoned in Sudak and used the time to write a cycle of poems called Подвальные (The Cellar). After her release, she expanded some of these into a series of longer pieces, Подвальные очерки (Cellar Essays, 1924-1925). Some of these were printed in 1926 in the magazine Перезвоны (Chimes) in Riga. All dealt with the question of the border between life and death wherein people on the verge of death leave behind their earthly pleasures and seek truth.

== Death and legacy ==
In 1924, the family homes in Sudak were nationalized. Living in abject poverty and unable to find publishers, she and her son were forced to share a single pair of shoes. Finding the Soviet regime to be one of “coarse materialism”, she tried to emigrate with her family to France, but was unsuccessful. She died in a hospital in Sudak after suffering an acute attack of nephritis on 25 June 1925 and was buried in the Sudak Cemetery. The cemetery was destroyed in the 1980s and no trace of her burial remains. After the demise of the Soviet Union, interest in Gertsyk revived. A museum named in honor of her and her sister, the Adelaide and Eugenia Gertsyk Museum of Silver Age, was established in Sudak and poetry readings of their work commenced in 1996. In 2006, Natalia K. Bonetskaia published a book, Русская Сивилла и её современники: творческий портрет Аделаиды Герцык (Russian Sibyl and her contemporaries: Artistic portrait of Adelaida Gertsyk) re-examining the significance of Gertsyk in light of her peers, and found that she was "one of the least known but brightest figures of the Russian Silver Age".
