= Concordia Antarova =

Russian opera singer (1886–1959)

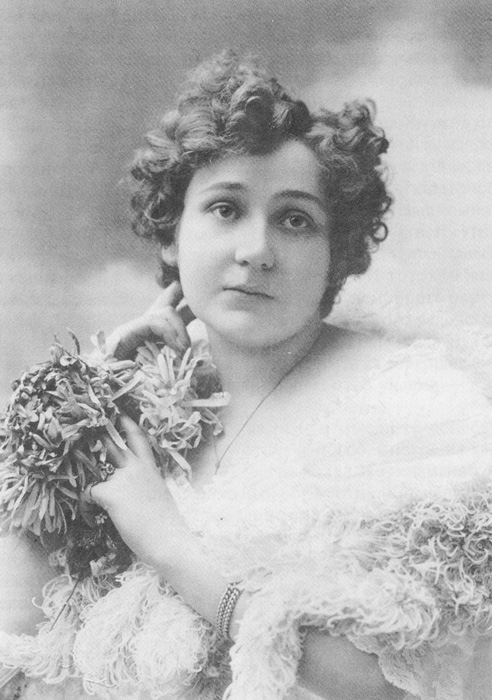
- Born: Concordia Evgenievna Antarova; 13 April 1886; Warsaw, Congress Poland, Russian Empire
- Died: 6 February 1959 (aged 72); Moscow, USSR
- Other names: Cora Antarova, Konkordia Antarova, Kora Antarova
- Occupations: opera singer, writer
- Years active: 1907–
- Known for: Theosophical writings

Concordia Antarova (Russian: Конкордия Евгеньевна Антарова, also known as Cora Antarova, 25 April 1886 O.S./13 April 1886 (N. S.) – 6 February 1959) was a Russian contralto who starred in the Bolshoi Theater for more than twenty years. After her singing career ended, she wrote theosophical texts. She was recognized as an Honored Artist of the RSFSR in 1933.

== Early life ==
Concordia Evgenievna Antarova was born on 13 April 1886 in Warsaw, Russian Poland. Her father was an employee of the Department of Public Education. Her mother, who gave language lessons, was the first cousin of Arkady Vladimirovich Tyrkov and the niece of Sophia Perovskaya, two of the members of Narodnaya Volya, who had attempted to assassinate Tsar Alexander II of Russia. Her father died when Antarova was eleven years old, and her mother died when she was in the sixth grade, aged fourteen. In spite of being orphaned, she completed her studies at Gymnasium in 1901. Deciding to enter a convent, Antarova sang in the choir and began to develop an interest in performing music. John of Kronstadt advised her that her vocation was to be part of the world rather than in the convent.

When school friends were able to gather sufficient funds for her to continue studying, Antarova moved to Saint Petersburg. In the 1901–1902 season, she performed as Solokha and the female innkeeper in Tchaikovsky's opera Vakula the Smith at the Saint Petersburg People's Hall. Enrolling in the Bestuzhev Courses, she graduated from the History and Philology Faculty 1904. Though she wanted to continue with music studies, Antarova had to work to be able to pay for lessons with Ippolitus Petrovich Pryanishnikov at the Saint Petersburg Conservatory. She took a job as a teacher in the Nikolaevskaya Railway's Alexandrovsky foundry school, riding the train an hour each way to teach and back for her singing lessons. The lack of food and fatigue led to her developing bronchial asthma, which plagued her the rest of her life. In 1907, she graduated from the Conservatory and was sent to the Mariinsky Theatre to audition. Of the 160 singers, she was the only one hired.

== Career ==
Antarova performed as the mezzo-soprano soloist for a year at the Mariinsky, before being hired as a replacement for another singer who worked at the Bolshoi Theatre in Moscow. Her debut in 1908 was as Ratmir in the opera Ruslan and Lyudmila by Mikhail Glinka. From 1908 to 1930 and then from 1932 to 1936 she performed as a soloist of Bolshoi. From December 1930 to July 1932, she asked to be released from the Bolshoi and worked as a librarian from November 1931. She may have performed briefly in 1931 with the State Academic Opera and Ballet Theater or been detained in a camp after her husband had been shot. While performing, between 1918 and 1922, Antarova took acting classes from Konstantin Stanislavski at the Opera Studio of the Bolshoi Theatre. She also performed in concerts, with solos in works such as Petite messe solennelle by Gioachino Rossini and Vier ernste Gesänge by Johannes Brahms. Some of her most noted roles were as Lel in Nikolai Rimsky-Korsakov's The Snow Maiden; Vanya in A Life for the Tsar by Glinka; Floshildy in Richard Wagner's Das Rheingold and Götterdämmerung; and as the Countess in Tchaikovsky's The Queen of Spades, among many others. In 1933, she was recognized as an Honored Artist of the Russian Soviet Federative Socialist Republic.

Soon after Sophia Parnok died, Olga Tsuberbiller began a relationship with Antarova, which would last until the singer's death. Tsuberbiller was a noted mathematician who taught at the Moscow State University of Fine Chemical Technologies. After she left the stage, Antarova began writing and publishing books. In 1939, she wrote Беседы К.С.Станиславского (Conversations with K. S. Stanislavski). During the war she lived in Moscow, wrote a three-volume Theosophical novel, Two Lives, which along with two other volumes on Stanislavski remained unpublished in her lifetime. In 1946, she organized a division of the Russian theatrical society dedicated to Stanislavski and promotion of his theatrical methods. Because she attended Theosophical Society meetings and was open about her explorations of mysticism and the occult, Antarova was surveilled constantly, though she escaped arrest because Stalin admired her voice.

== Death and legacy ==
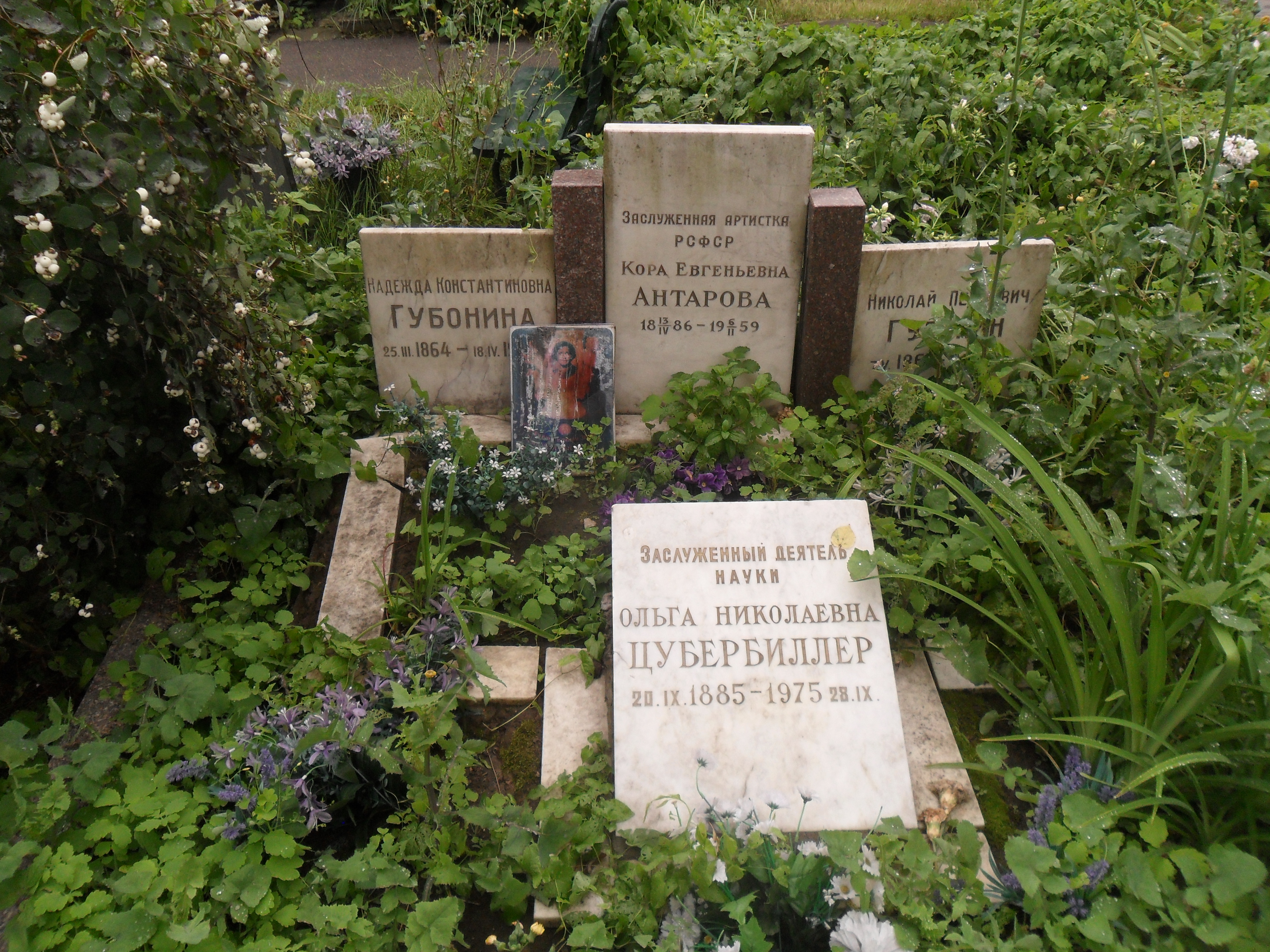
Antarova and Tsuberbiller's grave

Suffering from ill-health from 1956, Antarova died on 6 February 1959 after a long illness, in which she was cared for by her partner Tsuberbiller. Tsuberbiller never fully recovered from the pain of Antarova's death. The two women were buried side by side in the Novodevichy Cemetery when Tsuberbiller died in 1975. Posthumously, her book Two Lives was published in 1993 and her book on Stanislavski has been re-published several times, being translated into other languages.
