= Lyudmila Erarskaya =

Russian actress (1890–1964)

Erarskaya in 1932

Lyudmila Erarskaya (Russian: Людмила Владимировна Эрарская, 1890–1964), was a Russian actress who performed from the pre-revolutionary period until her death in Moscow in 1964. She was an associate and friend of some of the most noted intellectuals of her era and was most known for her relationship with and inspiration of poems by Sophia Parnok.

== Biography ==
Lyudmila Vladimirovna Erarskaya was a Russian actress who worked in the Moscow theater created by N. K. Nezlobina, in pre-Revolutionary Russia. She was the lover-muse of poet Sophia Parnok from 1916 to 1926, and the inspiration for Parnok's adaptation of the libretto, Almast. During the war years, she and Parnok lived in the Crimea in the town of Sudak and Erarskaya staged productions to entertain the intellectual community who were living there, such as Adelaida Gertsyk, Eugenia Gertsyk, Alexander Spendiarov, and Maximilian Voloshin. She also joined the Federal Art Workers Union, becoming its secretary, while simultaneously heading the theater section for the Ministry of Education in Sudak. She staged benefits for the Sudak High School and performed plays written by the community for the soldiers fighting in the area. Returning to Moscow in 1921, she suffered a serious bout of tuberculosis in 1923 and in January 1925, suffered a mental breakdown and was hospitalized for a year. By the time of her release, she had developed a friendship with Parnok's friend, Olga Tsuberbiller which would last throughout her life. From the 1930s until her death, Erarskaya performed at the Moscow Puppet Theater. She was the sister of the opera singer, Vera Erarskaya (Russian: Вера Владимировна Эрарская).

== Performances ==
- Вечер памяти Оскара Уайльда (An Evening to the memory of Oscar Wilde, 1914)
- Карл Брунер (Karl Bruner, 2-act play adaptation of the novel by Bela Balash)
- Ровно в 6. 25 (Promptly at 6:25, a 3-act play)
- Сказка про петуха и богатого барина (A Tale of a Rooster and a Rich Sage, a 2-act play)
- Дочь и падчерица(Daughter and Step-daughter, a 2-act play)
- Р. В. С. (R. V. S. a 2-act play adaptation of the story by Arkady Gaidar)
- Горшочек (The Pot, adaptation of the Novgorod fairy tale from the collection of M. Serova, Moscow Puppet Theater)
- Хирургия (Surgery, adaptation of short story by Anton Chekhov, Moscow Puppet Theater)
- Неудача (Failure, adaptation of short story by Chekhov, Moscow Puppet Theater)
- С женой поссорился (I quarreled with my wife, adaptation of short story by Chekhov, Moscow Puppet Theater)
