= Vladimir Volkenstein =

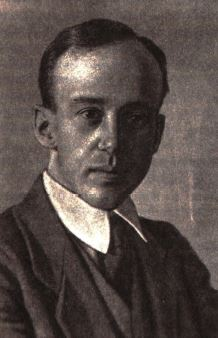
- Born: Vladimir Mikhaylovich Volkenstein; Владимир Михайлович Волькенштейн; 15 October 1883; St Petersburg, Imperial Russia
- Died: 30 November 1974 (aged 91); Leningrad, Soviet Union
- Occupations: playwright, critic, reader in drama
- Spouse: Sophia Parnok (1907-1909)
- Awards: Griboyedov Prize (1913/1914)

Vladimir Mikhaylovich Volkenstein (Владимир Михайлович Волькенштейн, born 15 October 1883, died 30 November 1974), was a Russian Empire and Soviet playwright, theatre and literary critic, poet and reader in drama.

A Saint Petersburg University's Law faculty graduate, Volkenstein started out as a poet. He debuted as a playwright in 1907, when fragments of his play Ivan Doctors appeared in the Shipovnik (Wild Roses) almanac. In 1911 Stanislavski invited him to Moscow Art Theatre, where he worked until 1921, first as a secretary, later a literary consultant.

Volkenstein's first major success came with the play Kaliki perekhozhiye (Wanderers). It was produced by the MAT's First Studio and earned him the Griboyedov Prize in 1914. It was followed by Herod and Marianna (1916), Paganini (1920), The Experience of Mr. Webb (Опыт мистера Вебба, produced by the Moscow Korsh Theatre, 1918–1922), Spartak (Moscow Revolution Theatre, 1926), and Houssars and Doves (Maly Theatre, 1928).

In 1930—1948 (with a break during the War) Vokenstein read the esthetics and film drama at the Gerasimov Institute of Cinematography. He wrote a script for the film Miklouho-Maclay, shot in 1947 by Aleksandr Razumny. Among Volkenstein's theoretical works the most important are considered to be a monograph on Stanislavski and the textbook Drama, centering around the technical aspects of the classical epic drama of the past.

Volkenstein was married three times. His first wife was the poet and feminist Sophia Parnok (1907-1909). Mikhail Volkenshtein, his son from the second marriage, became a well-known biophysicist. His third wife was Maria Gambaryan, a notable Soviet, Armenian classical pianist.
