= Vedeneev =

Vedeneev or Vedeneyev (feminine: Vedeneeva or Vedeneyeva) is a Russian surname. Notable people with the surname include:

- Boris Vedeneev (1885–1946), Russian and Soviet scientist, power engineer and hydraulic engineer
- Ekaterina Vedeneeva (born 1994), Russian-Slovenian rhythmic gymnast
- Nikolai Vedeneyev (1897–1964), Soviet Army lieutenant general
- Nina Vedeneyeva (1882–1955), Russian physicist
- Tatyana Vedeneyeva (born 1953), Soviet and Russian actress
- Vasily Vedeneev (1947–2008) Soviet and Russian writer

== See also ==
- Vedeneyev M14P
