= Sergey Solovyov (historian) =

Russian historian

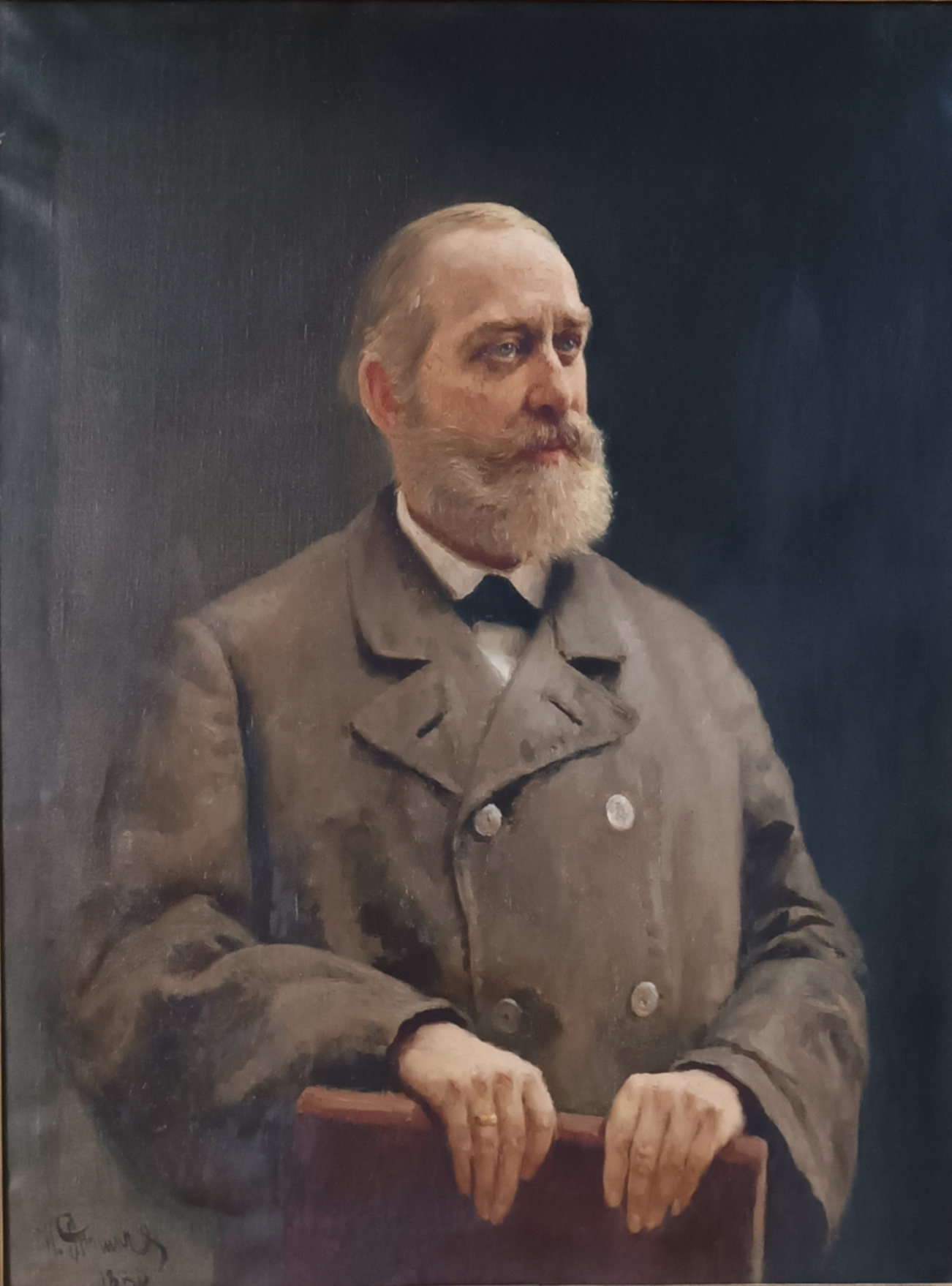
Sergey Mikhaylovich Solovyov, 1880.

Sergey Mikhaylovich Solovyov (sometimes Soloviev or Solovyev, Russian: Сергей Михайлович Соловьёв; 17 May [O.S. 5 May] 1820 – 16 October [O.S. 4 October] 1879) was one of the influential Russian historians whose influence on the next generation of Russian historians (Vasily Klyuchevsky, Dmitry Ilovaisky, Sergey Platonov) was paramount.

== Life and works ==
Solovyov studied in the Moscow University under Timofey Granovsky and traveled in Europe as a tutor of Count Stroganov's children until 1844. The following year he joined the staff of the Moscow University, where he rose to the position of dean and then rector (1871–77). He also administrated the Kremlin Armoury and acted as tutor to the future Alexander III of Russia.

Solovyov's magnum opus was the History of Russia from the Earliest Times, unprecedented in its scope and depth. From 1851 until his death, he published 29 volumes of this work. Among his other books, the History of Poland's Downfall (1863) and the Public Readings on Peter the Great (1872) were probably the most popular.

== Views and influence ==
Solovyov appreciated Russia's position as the outpost of Christianity in the East. In his opinion, the Russian statehood resulted from a "natural and necessary development" of numerous political and social forces, which he attempted to trace. He took particular interest in the Time of Troubles and Peter the Great's reforms, which he described as temporary diseases of the organism of the Russian state.

In the words of the 2004 Encyclopædia Britannica, his History "wove a vast body of data into a unified and orderly whole that provided an exceptionally powerful and vivid picture of Russia's political development over the centuries. The work inaugurated a new era in Russian scholarship with its depiction of Russia as evolving through organic and rational processes from a primitive, family-based society into a centralized, autocratic state".

== Family ==
His older son Vsevolod Solovyov was a historical novelist. His son Vladimir Solovyov was one of the most influential Russian philosophers. His youngest child, daughter Polyxena Solovyova, was a noted poet and illustrator.

== See also ==
- List of Russian historians
