= Vsevolod Solovyov =

Russian historical novelist

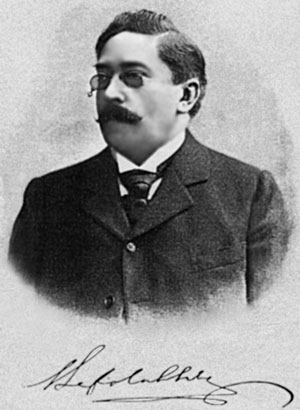
Vsevolod Solovyov

Vsevolod Sergeyevich Solovyov (Russian: Всеволод Сергеевич Соловьёв; 1 January 1849 [O.S. 20 December 1848] – 2 November [O.S. 20 October] 1903) was a Russian historical novelist. His most famous work is Chronicle of Four Generations (five volumes, 1881–86), an account of the fictional Gorbatov family from the time of Catherine the Great to the mid-nineteenth century. Solovyov's "atmosphere of nostalgia for the vanished age of the nobility" helps explain his "posthumous popularity among Russian émigrés."

Oldest son of the historian Sergei Solovyov and brother of the philosopher Vladimir Solovyov and poet Polyxena Solovyova, Vsevolod turned to writing historical fiction in 1876 with Princess Ostrozhskaya. He visited Paris in 1884 where he met Blavatsky and mixed with other people in the Paris occult scene, such as Juliette Adam, Vera Jelikovsky, Blavatsky's sister, and Emilie de Morsier. By 1886 he had abandoned his plans to promote Theosophy in Russia and denounced Blavatsky as a failed spy of the Okhrana. At the time he was intimately involved with Yuliana Glinka, who worked for Pyotr Rachkovsky, Paris head of the Okhrana.

Of his later novels, the best known are The Magi (1889) and The Great Rosicrucian (1890), dealing with mystics of the late eighteenth and early nineteenth century.

== Publications ==
- «Княжна Острожская» («Нива», 1876)
- «Юный император» («Нива», 1877)
- «Капитан гренадерской роты» («Историческая библиотека», 1878)
- «Юный император» (1877)
- «Царь Девица» («Нива», 1878)
- «Касимовская невеста» («Нива», 1879)
- «Наваждение» («Русский вестник», 1879)
- «Хроника четырёх поколений»:
  - «Сергей Горбатов» («Нива», 1881)
  - «Вольтерьянец» («Нива», 1882)
  - «Старый дом» («Нива», 1883)
  - «Изгнанник» (1885)
  - «Последние Горбатовы» (1886)
- «Волхвы» («Север», 1889)
- «Царское посольство» (1890);
- «Великий розенкрейцер» («Север», 1890)
- «Новые рассказы» (1892)
- «Жених царевны» (1893)
- «Злые вихри» (1894)
- «Цветы бездны» («Русский вестник», 1895)
- A Modern Priestess of Isis (1895) [translated on behalf of the Society for Psychical Research by Walter Leaf]
