= Sophia Parnok =

Russian writer (1885–1933)

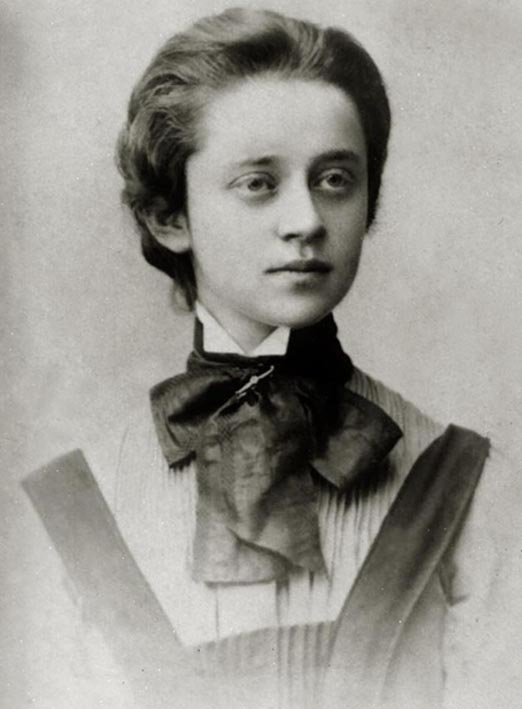
- Born: Sonya Yakovlevna Parnokh; 11 August 1885; Taganrog, Yekaterinoslav Governorate, Russian Empire
- Died: 26 August 1933 (aged 48); Karinskoye, Odintsovsky District, Moscow Oblast, Soviet Union
- Occupation: Poet
- Writing career
- Pen name: Andrei Polianin (as journalist; also shown as Andrey Polyanin)
- Period: 20th-century

Sophia Yakovlevna Parnok (Russian: София Яковлевна Парнок, Yiddish: סאָפיאַ פארנוכ; 30 July 1885 O.S./11 August 1885 (N.S.) – 26 August 1933) was a Russian poet, journalist and translator. From the age of six, she wrote poetry in a style quite distinct from the predominant poets of her times, revealing instead her own sense of Russianness, Jewish identity and lesbianism. Besides her literary work, she worked as a journalist under the pen name of Andrei Polianin. She has been referred to as "Russia's Sappho", as she wrote openly about her seven lesbian relationships.

Sonya Yakovlevna Parnokh was born into a well-to-do family of professional Jews in a provincial city outside the Pale of Settlement. Her mother died after giving birth to her twin siblings and she was raised by her father and her step-mother, leaving her feeling her childhood lacked emotional support. From a young age, she wrote poetry and acknowledged her uniqueness—her lesbianism, her Graves' disease, and her religion—which set her apart from her peers.

Completing her studies at the Mariinskaya Gymnasium, in 1905 Parnok moved to Geneva and attempted to study music, but lacked any real drive and quickly returned to Moscow. To distance herself from her father's control and her financial dependence on him, she published her first book of poems in 1906 under the pseudonym Sophia Parnok and married Vladimir Volkenstein in 1907. Within two years, the marriage failed and she began working as a journalist.

From 1913, Parnok exclusively had relationships with women and used those love relationships to fuel her creativity. In a succession of relationships with Marina Tsvetaeva, Lyudmila Erarskaya, Olga Tsuberbiller, Maria Maksakova and Nina Vedeneyeva, her muses propelled her to publish five collections of poetry and write several librettos for opera, before her disease claimed her life in 1933.

Her poetry was banned after 1928, and her work almost forgotten until 1979 when her collected works were published for the first time. While scholars have focused on her early influential relationship with Tsvetaeva, her best works are now recognized as those written from 1928.

== Early life and education ==
Sonya Yakovlevna Parnokh was born on 11 August 1885, in the city of Taganrog to Alexandra Abramovna (née Idelson) (Russian: Александра Абрамовна Идельсон) and Yakov Solomonovich Parnokh (Russian: Яков Соломонович Парнох). Taganrog was outside the Pale of Settlement and had never experienced the Pogroms which had arisen in other regions of the Russian Empire. Her father was a Jewish pharmacist and the owner of an apothecary. Her mother was a physician, one of the first women doctors in the empire. The oldest of three children, Parnokh, was the only one to have been raised by her mother, as Alexandra died shortly after giving birth to her twins Valentin, known as "Valya", and Yelizaveta, known as "Liza". The family was intellectual and taught by their father at home until ready to enter gymnasium or secondary school. From a young age, they were taught to read and received training in French and German, as well as music. Parnokh and her brother both wrote poetry from childhood; she began writing at age six and he, at the age of nine. Valentin would later introduce jazz to Russia and Yelizaveta became a noted author of children's literature.

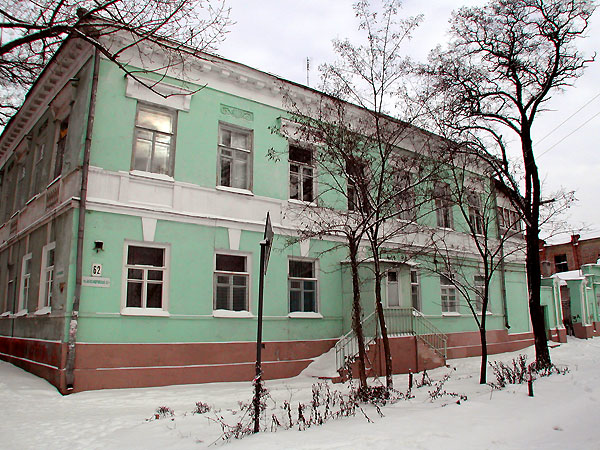
Birthplace of Parnok in Taganrog

Shortly after Alexandra's death, Yakov remarried with the children's German governess. While they materially were brought up in comfort, the children had little emotional support from their step-mother. As a result, Parnokh felt that she had been forced to grow up too fast and did not have a childhood. In 1894, she entered the Mariinskaya Gymnasium and from this period, began writing profusely, producing around 50 poems which are representative of her juvenilia. Unlike her brother's teenage writings, Parnokh's works from the period do not reflect influences of the decadent or symbolist artists who were prolific at this time. Instead, her work explored her feelings, burgeoning lesbianism, and fantasies with a more psychological, than artistic purpose. Through her poetry, she became unperturbed by disapproval and seemed to accept her lesbianism as an innate trait that made her unique and different. In addition, she suffered from Graves' disease, which affected her looks and made her feel increasingly unusual, as did her intense identification with both Russia and her Jewishness—a position not shared by her father's indifference to his religion nor her brother's loathing of Russia and the antisemitism he faced.

In 1902, Parnokh spent the summer in Crimea, where she had her first real romance with Nadezhda "Nadya" Pavlovna Polyakova, her muse for the next five years. From this point on, a pattern of muse-lovers was established which would fuel Parnokh's creativity throughout her career. Her devotion was not steadfast and though Nadya inspired Parnokh, as with other lovers, she was not monogamous. As she approached her graduation, Parnokh and her father's relationship became increasingly strained. His disapproval of her failure to apply herself seriously to her writing and to her lesbianism brought them into conflict. She graduated with the gold medal (equivalent to the western designation summa cum laude) in May 1903. Where she lived for the next two years is unknown, but because of later references to having lived in Moscow as a teenager under the patronage of Yekaterina Geltzer, a prima ballerina of the Bolshoi Ballet, it is probable that at least part of that time was spent there.

Shortly before the 1905 Revolution, Parnokh was baptised into the Russian Orthodox faith. Her writings from this period reflect a new interest in religion and an exploration of Christianity. It was not unusual during this time of crisis for the Russian Jewish intelligentsia to convert, in an effort to foster a nationalist aim, rather than as a disavowal of their faith. In 1905, Parnokh convinced her father that she wanted to study music in Geneva. While studying at the Geneva Conservatory, she began a correspondence with Vladimir Volkenstein, a young poet, and later playwright, who had expressed an interest in her poetry. The two were compatible in temperament and their disdain for symbolism, and she found in Volkenstein a partner who was not bothered by her sexuality, instead judging her works as allegorical and abstract. At the end of the year, she made a trip to Florence, Italy and though she returned to Geneva, her enrollment in the Conservatory was brief; by spring 1906, she had returned to Moscow to live with Nadya Polyakova. The instability caused by the revolution and her inability to find a publisher forced Parnokh to return to her father's home in Taganrog in June. Her father's refusal to welcome her and his reduction of her allowance pressed Parnokh to begin searching in earnest for a publisher. Using her contact with Volkenstein as leverage, she asked him to help her find a publisher and instructed him to have the work printed under the name of Sophia Parnok because "I detest the letter kh (Russian: х)". Though she had intended her poem Life to be her publishing debut, it never appeared in print. Instead, The Autumn Garden was her first published work, appearing in November 1906 in the Journal for Everyone, edited by Viktor Mirolyubov. Soon afterward, the relationship with Polyakova ended.

== Career ==
=== Pre-World War I period ===
To escape her father's influence and gain independence, Parnok and Volkenstein married in September 1907 and moved to Saint Petersburg. As she had suspected, living in the capital widened her circle of literary friends. She soon made friends with Liubov Gurevich, the most important woman journalist at the time and the married couple, Sophia Chatskina (Russian: Софья Исааковна Чацкина) and Yakov Saker (Russian: Яков Львович Сакер). The couple owned the journal Northern Annals (Russian: Северные записки), publishing the works of poets such as Alexander Blok, Mikhail Kuzmin, Vyacheslav Ivanov, Fyodor Sologub, and Maximilian Voloshin. Parnok enrolled in the Bestuzhev Courses to study law and continued publishing poems in various journals. She also began to do translation work, having been invited in 1908 by Gurevich to co-edit a French-Russian translation of Petits poèmes en prose by Charles Baudelaire. The Baudelaire project fell apart, her Graves' disease flared up, and she became increasingly unhappy with her work. In January 1909, finding her marriage to be stifling, Parnok left her husband and settled in Moscow. Volkenstein finally agreed to a divorce in the spring, but their break-up embittered the two and their earlier friendship never recovered.

Between 1910 and 1917, Parnok worked as a journalist under the pseudonym Andrei Polianin, specifically choosing to separate her literary works from her journalism. She lived a nomadic existence, moving five times in the period to various addresses around Moscow, spending at least six months of 1911 in Saint Petersburg. Her health problems intensified leading to bouts of severe depression, despite the acceptance of some of her poems in prestigious journals like Messenger of Europe (Russian: Вестник Европы) and Russian Thought (Russian: Русская мысль). Her father's death in 1913, both freed and imprisoned her, removing the physical, yet strained relationship but forcing her to earn her own living. When Gurevich, who had become both a mother-figure and creative advisor took over as head of the literary section of Russian Talk (Russian: Русская молва), she hired Parnok as a literary critic. She wrote a series of articles in Northern Annals in 1913, including Noteworthy Names, a review of works by Anna Akhmatova, Nikolai Klyuev and Igor Severyanin and Seeking the Path of Art, an anti-acmeist essay. Parnok's literary taste was conservative and decidedly anti-modernist. She valued the classical works of writers such as Dante, Goethe and Pushkin.

Since her divorce, Parnok had not had a permanent partner. In the spring of 1913, she fell in love with the Moscovite socialite, Iraida Karlovna Albrecht (Russian: Ираида Карловна Альбрехт), who spurred her into a creative period. After spending the summer together in Butovo, she returned to working on a novella, Anton Ivanovich, began a collaboration with Maximilian Steinberg on an opera based on the Arabian Nights and rented the first permanent housing she had held in a long time, even acquiring a monkey. She also accepted a position at Northern Annals where she wrote reviews. In the spring of 1914, Parnok and Albrecht began an extended trip abroad, traveling through Ascona to the Italian area of Switzerland, and then visiting Milan, Rome and Venice before heading north to Hamburg. Continuing to Shanklin on the Isle of Wight and eventually London, Parnok continued to write reviews and poems. Learning that World War I had broken out, the couple made immediate plans to return to Moscow, where Parnok frantically tried to locate her siblings. She found they were abroad—Valya in Jaffa and Liza in Dresden. Moving into a new apartment, Parnok's life at the beginning of the war was calm and productive.

=== Marina Tsvetaeva period ===
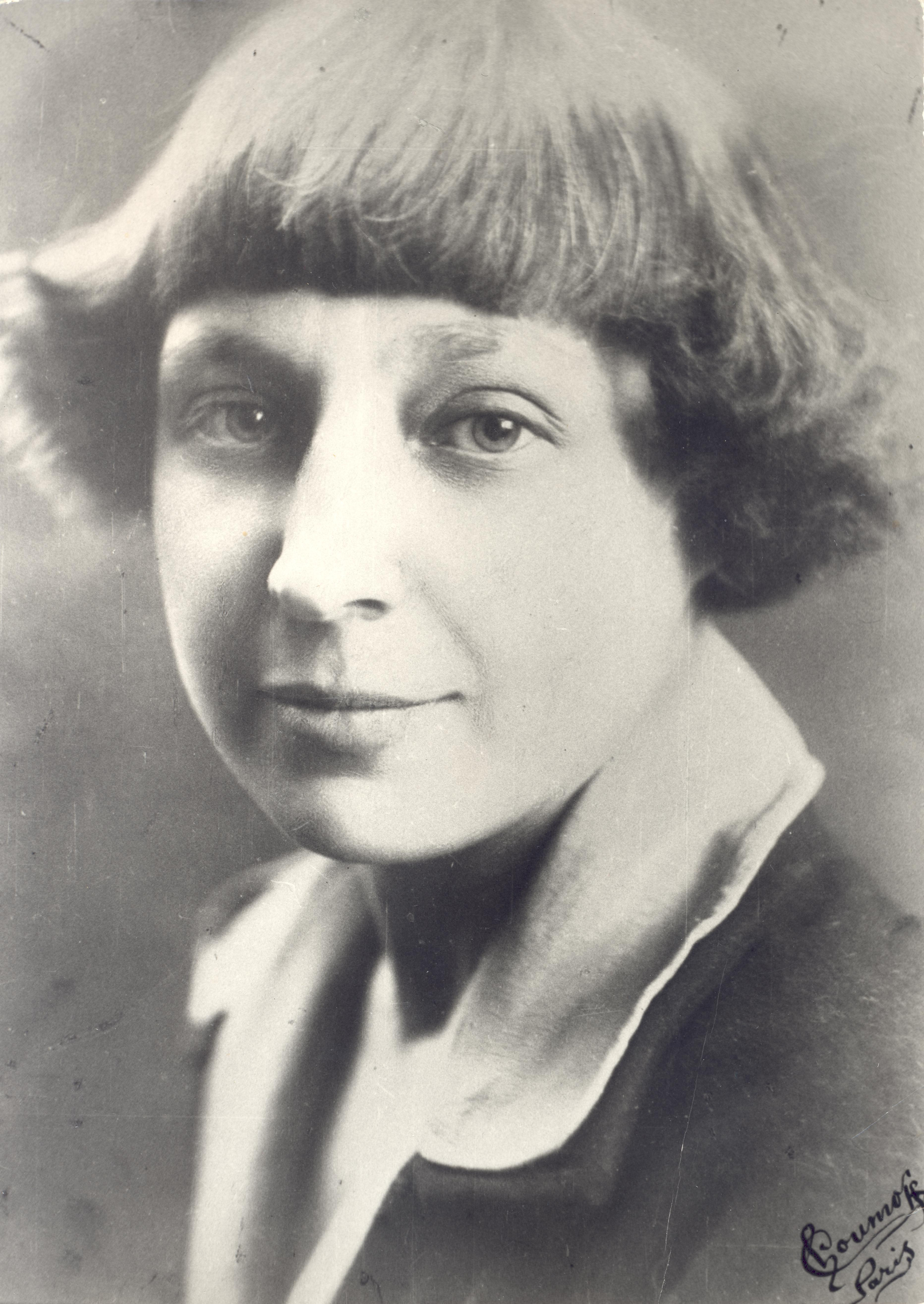
Marina Tsvetaeva

In 1914, at one of the literary salons hosted by Adelaida Gertsyk, Parnok met the young poet Marina Tsvetaeva, with whom she became involved in an affair that left important imprints on the poetry of both women. Around the same time, Parnok read, and later rewrote some of the works of the Greek poet Sappho. By October, Tsvetaeva had committed to the affair, disregarding her obligations to her husband and daughter by writing her first love poem to Parnok. Prior to her affair with Tsvetaeva, Parnok's poetry had not shown the originality of expression that her later works would evidence. Each of the two women drove the other to excel, revealing that Parnok had the upper-hand in love while Tsvetaeva was the more refined poet. On a personal level, Tsvetaeva was both attracted to and repelled by Parnok's passion, increasing her feelings of insecurity. On a professional level, both were surprised at the depth of their own jealousy, channeling their envy into a creative duel of words.

In Tsvetaeva's Podruga (Girlfriend) cycle, she acted as a seer, peering into Parnok's future, predicting she was a doomed, tragic figure cursed by her passions. In her later works (poems 54 and 58 in her first book of verse, Poems), Parnok responded with calm to the dire predictions that the couple would break up. To Tsvetaeva's constant worries about who would be the conqueror of their battles, Parnok replied that they were equals. There was a mother-daughter aspect to the relationship and the poems written during it, in that Tsvetaeva entered the relationship as a novice to lesbian passion, though not to its attraction, later maturing in her relationship. On the other hand, Parnok entered their union as the less experienced poet, benefiting in her later writing from the seeds of her collaboration with Tsvetaeva. Rather than the typical stereotypical older-woman-seducer, Tsvetaeva assumed the male lover's role as pursuer in her poems, taunting Parnok with her desire to be the betrayer rather than the betrayed. Poems appeared shortly before Parnok and Tsvetaeva broke up in 1916 and displayed the mastery of her craft. The lyrics in Parnok's Poems presented the first, non-decadent, lesbian-desiring subject ever to be included in a book of Russian poetry. Parnok's poems about their affair were more restrained than Tsvetaeva's, but Parnok planned to have hers published in contrast to Tsvataeva who presented Podruga to Parnok as a gift.

In the summer of 1915, Parnok and Tsvetaeva, both of their sisters, and Osip Mandelstam were guests at Maximilian Voloshin's dacha in Koktebel. Parnok did not care for Mandelstam though Tsvetaeva was openly friendly and would later have an affair with him. By July, the lovers left Koktebel, just before Tsvetaeva's husband arrived, after which they spent a month on holiday in Sviatye Gory. In January 1916, Tsvetaeva and Mandelstam met at a literary salon in Saint Petersburg, possibly by chance, and recognized each other's talents. The meeting caused a heated quarrel with Parnok. The following month, Mandelstam's attempt to maintain contact with Tsvetaeva ended her relationship with Parnok. Tsvetaeva had taken Mandelstam to see the sites of Moscow, and when she came home from the outing, she found Parnok entertaining the actress Lyudmila Vladimirovna Erarskaya. It is unknown exactly when Parnok and Erarskaya met, but theirs would be the longest relationship of the poet's life, lasting for the next sixteen years. In a pique, Tsvetaeva asked Parnok to return her Podruga and her manuscripts. Parnok was outraged that Tsvetaeva wanted her gift returned, considering it an attempt to conceal the origin of the poems in their affair.

The long-reaching effects of their liaison would last until their deaths. In her later years, Parnok's works often reminisced on the best and worst aspects of their stormy affair. Tsvetaeva, on the other hand, tried to eliminate Parnok completely from her life and her works. By summer, Tsvetaeva, who had returned to her husband, was pregnant and Parnok and Erarskaya were living together in an apartment at 2 Sukharevskaya Sadovaya Street. As a result of the February Revolution in 1917, Northern Annals closed, ending abruptly Parnok's career as a critic and her most constant source of income. Illness for each of the couple, famine and the political upheaval of the war, forced them to make plans to move to the Crimea by fall.

=== Sudak period ===
Parnok left Moscow in late summer 1917 and spent the Russian Civil War years in the Crimean town of Sudak with Erarskaya. Soon after their arrival, she was approached by Alexander Spendiaryan (known in Russia as Alexander Spendiarov) and asked to prepare the libretto for a 4-act opera Almast, based on an Armenian legend. Parnok immediately set to work, sourcing her dramatic verse on the epic poem, The Taking of Tmuk Fortress, by Hovhannes Tumanyan and using Erarskaya as her inspiration. She finished the libretto by the winter of 1918, long before Spendiaryan had completed the musical score, and returned to reading Sappho. At that time in Russia, as elsewhere, Sappho was considered a heterosexual poet because she wrote about desire. Both physical love and desire, were perceived as masculine traits, thus women poets who wrote erotic lyrics without shame, regardless of their sexual orientation, were often given the label Sapphic. Simultaneously, she and Eugenia Gertsyk, Adelaida's sister, became closer friends, reveling in their spiritual quest. She viewed her relationship with Eugenia as that of an older and wiser guide, who could help her mature spiritually and break her addiction to love.

Sudak proved to be a productive writing time for Parnok and in 1919, she published in an almanac a substantial number of lyrics, which focused on her new-found spiritual journey. She prepared most of the poems for two journals which would be published later. These demonstrated her poetic evolution from her past to her future. Her collection Roses of Pieria (1922) clearly evoked the influence of Sappho, with her acknowledgement of the first lesbian poet. The poems reflected her attempt to write of her experiences and desire as a sexually active lover of women, but she stylized her homoerotic verse in a way that was almost alien to her natural poetic voice. She was unsatisfied with the collection and knew before it was published that her next collection was more authentically her own. The Vine (1923) incorporated the influence of Eugenia Gertsyk, presenting her own account in lyrical form of her development as a lesbian poet. Using biblical symbolism, she wrote of the physical rapture and suffering of her body which diverted her quest to grow spiritually and produce poetry as her dedicated vocation.

As a group, the intellectual community in Sudak worked on productions for their own entertainment. Parnok and the two Gertsyk sisters wrote verse; Spendiaryan, who was still struggling with opera, wrote songs; Erarskaya, who had taken a job with the Ministry of Education, staged plays. Fighting was fierce in the Crimea and food was scarce. Civil employees were paid in rations, rather than wages, and to supplement their meager food supplies, Parnok tried to work a vegetable garden. In early 1921, she was arrested and sent to a prison in Sudak, where she contracted a severe case of tuberculosis. Adelaida and Spendiaryan were also arrested for failing to support the Red Army but all were released by the following spring. The experience of prison, and survival soon thereafter of a train crash, increased Parnok's fatalism. She had switched seats with another passenger, who was killed when the train derailed. She sustained no injury and for the rest of her life, was plagued by the memory.

In June, the General Directorate for the Protection of State Secrets in the Press (GLAVLIT) was created to censor propaganda, state secrets, misinformation, fanaticism and pornography. Fairly quickly, the bureau would begin making lists of banned materials and authors. In December, Parnok and Erarskaya left the Crimea during the terrible famine in a special hospital train, thanks to Voloshon who had specifically requested their right of passage.

=== Return to Moscow ===
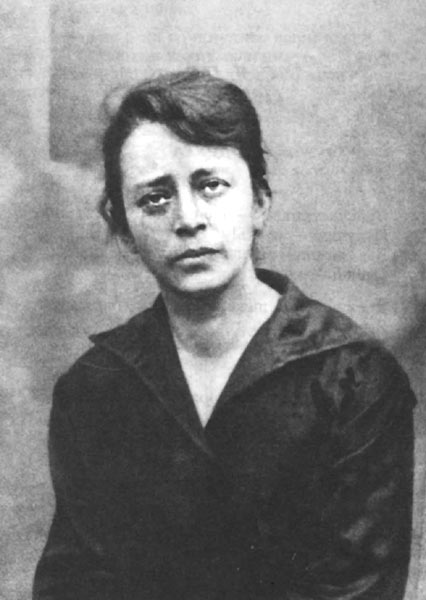
Parnok in 1922

In early 1922, Parnok returned to Moscow with Erarskaya and was assisted by Vladimir Mayakovsky, who helped her find lodging and join the Writer's Union. Almost as soon as she arrived, she began experiencing trouble with the censors. Her attempts to help Maximilian Voloshin publish a collection of poems were repeatedly refused. When she tried a few months later to publish a collection of her own works, Centuries-Old Mead, the censors stopped the publication because there were too many religious references. Centuries-Old Mead was placed in stasis by the censorship bureau and never made it to press. She also feared that The Vine would have trouble with the censors because of its references to God. She had learned from previous experience that religious references were problematic. By fall, she was ill, suffering from both bronchitis and stomach problems caused by her Graves' disease. Erarskaya was also sick, having contracted tuberculosis.

In the beginning of 1923, Parnok embarked on a friendship with Olga Nikolaevna Tsuberbiller, a mathematician at Moscow State University. The exact nature of her relationship with Tsuberbiller is unknown as, while she occupied a significant place in the poet's life, Parnok did not describe Tsuberbiller in the same sexual context as her lovers. Instead, Tsuberbiller was a protector. Parnok would later describe her as almost a guardian angel in her collection of poems Half-Whispered. She joined the group known as the "Lyrical Circle", which included members like Lev Gornung, Leonid Grossman, Vladislav Khodasevich, and Vladimir Lidin. The members critiqued each other's work, which she hoped would help her find clarity and harmony in her works. Short of money, Parnok briefly took an office position, but soon quit and depended upon freelance translations and literary critiques to pay her bills, though critiques were beginning to be censored as well.

By 1925, Parnok and Tsuberbiller had become the closest of friends, and when Erarskaya was hospitalized for a mental break, Tsuberbiller was the one to whom she turned to regain her peace of mind. Parnok was distressed, feeling that her life had ended, and was unable to work because of her depression and worry over her lover. Erarskaya's paranoia and violent outbursts, led to unsettling trauma for Parnok, causing several fainting spells. In 1926, Parnok moved in with Tsuberbiller on Neopalimovsky Lane at Smolensky Boulevard. After a year in the sanatorium Erarskaya was finally pronounced well and released. Increasingly Parnok felt isolated from her readers and alienated from her peers, in part because by 1926 GLAVLIT's authority had been extended to cover both public and private publishing. Parnok feared that her cycle Music would not be accepted for publication. The censorship of her works, but also the unspoken censorship of herself, made her feel invisible, inspiring her poems such as Prologue (1928). She joined another group of poets, known as "The Knot" which was founded to publish the works of the members to secure that one of the group's first releases was the publishing of Music. The censors allowed "The Knot" to exists because their publication runs were limited to 700 copies or less.

Music was generally well received and earned praise from both Eugenia Gertsyk and Voloshin, pleasing Parnok. She made plans to spend the summer with Erarskaya and Tsuberbiller in Bratovshchina and was revived by the natural surroundings, writing eight poems. Though still inspired and writing poetry when they returned, Parnok increasingly suffered from ill health and depression. These feelings were acerbated by the continuing failure of Spendiaryan to complete the scores for Almast. The poems she wrote in early 1927 showed her growing loneliness and resignation to the inevitability of her own death. By spring, sales of "The Knot"′s publications had been quite good and Parnok felt revived enough to spend the summer with Erarskaya and Tsuberbiller in the small town of Khalepye in the Kiev Oblast of Ukraine. Once again the time in nature revived her spirit but she continued to suffer from bad health. Returning to Moscow, she was constantly ill, though she managed to finish her collection Half-Whispered by the end of the year.

=== Last loves ===
By early 1928, Parnok was bedridden, though still translating. She was depressed, "The Knot" had been forced to close after publishing Half-Whispered, she was suffering from writer's block with her poetry, and Spendiaryan had died without finishing the score to Almast. As censorship clamped down, Parnok's poetic voice became "unlawful", leading to prohibition on publication of her works in 1928. She made her living solely by translating poems by Charles Baudelaire, novels by Romain Rolland, Marcel Proust, Henri Barbusse and others. In May 1928, Maximilian Steinberg took it upon himself to complete Almast and Parnok agreed to try to get it approved for the Bolshoi Theatre to produce it. In 1929, Tsuberbiller's brother died, and she and Parnok became responsible for the care of his five-year-old twins.

In August 1929, Parnok had word from the Bolshoi that they would produce the opera, only if she wrote a Communist-themed prologue and epilogue to the production. In an effort to see the production completed, she agreed, but that created a rift with Steinberg, who claimed she was bowing to political pressure. She felt trapped between the theater managers and Steinberg. In the spring of 1930, Almast finally went into production, but the conductor made changes, deleting the management's requested prologue and epilogue. He also placed it on the schedule so that it would only have a two-day run. Spendiaryan's widow interceded by having Steinberg called to Moscow to rein in the wayward conductor and move the project to completion. When the opera finally debuted at the Bolshoi Theater in Moscow on 24 June 1930, it was a resounding success. The premier was so popular with the public, if not the critics, that it led off the Bolshoi's following fall season. When Maria Maksakova left the title role, Parnok severed her interest in the project, though it toured successfully in Odessa (1930), Tiflis (1932), Yerevan (1933) and in Paris (1951), among others.

By the end of the year, both Parnok and Tsuberbiller were exhausted and spent several weeks at Uzkoye to regain their health. When they returned to Moscow, they moved to a new apartment, which gave them more room, as well as space to entertain many colleagues from Tsuberbiller's work. Parnok began pursuing Maksakova, attending all her performances, and was re-inspired in her work. She began work on a libretto for an opera Gyul'nara by Yuliya Veysberg, which was dedicated to Maksakova. Though Parnok's infatuation was not reciprocated, it fueled a creative period and by the end of 1931, she had completed the libretto, which was first performed in 1935.

Parnok's last great love was the Georgian physicist, Nina Vedeneyeva. The two may have met as early as 1927, through Tsuberbiller, a colleague of Vedeneyeva. Vedeneyeva's son, Yevgeny, was living in exile at that time and Tsuberbiller, who had written a textbook used for decades in the high schools of Russia, helped her obtain books for him to maintain his studies. In January 1932, the relationship turned to romance, despite the facts that Parnok was still living with Tsuberbiller and Yevgeny disapproved of the relationship. As had happened before, her lover became her muse, inspiring her to write two cycles of poems, Ursa Major and Useless Goods. The frantic pace of her writing foretold the exhaustion she would suffer, which hastened her death, but Parnok was aware of the consequences. The references between these last two cycles and Parnok's adolescent poetry, make it clear that she had always known what she wanted to say, but until she reached her maturity, she did not know how to express her words. Their emotional bond, which accelerated after a trip to Vedeneyeva's summer cottage in Kashin in April, was destined to remain hidden from most of Vedeneyeva's family and friends. To keep up appearance of a mere friendship, they spent their summers apart.

Cutting herself off from all activities other than her work, her love and her immediate family, Parnok's poetry became paramount and with help from Tsuberbiller and Vedeneyeva she stopped translation work. By winter 1932, her body had become swollen with edema, signalling that her Graves' disease had affected her heart. For the next six months, Parnok was mostly bedridden and Vedeneyeva visited daily. In an attempt to improve Parnok's health, Tsuberbiller suggested that they summer in Karinskoye and despite the arduous trip, they arrived safely. Vedeneyeva vacationed separately in Crimea. While they were apart the lovers were plagued with poor mail service, which exacerbated Parnok's stress. On 31 July 1933, she penned her last complete poem, as a farewell to Vedeneyeva.

== Death and legacy ==
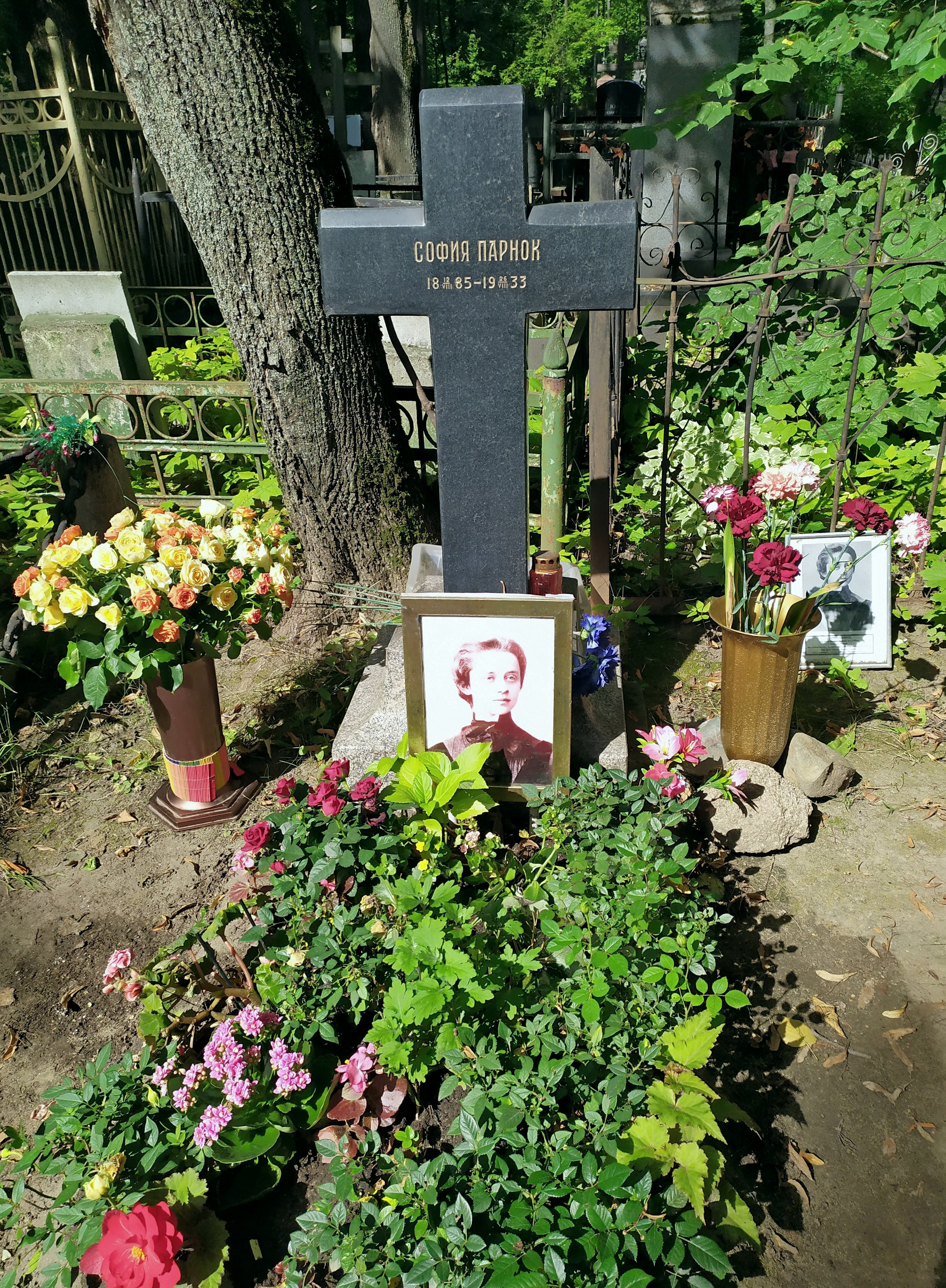
Parnok's grave at Vvedenskoye Cemetery in Moscow

On 20 August 1933, Vedeneyeva returned to Moscow and that same day, she took the train to join Parnok and Tsuberbiller in Karinskoye. The arrival was not due to Parnok's illness, but a scheduled arrival per her pre-planned itinerary. On 25 August, Tsuberbiller realized that Parnok was dying and notified Erarskaya. Parnok succumbed to a heart attack at 11:30 a.m. on the morning of 26 August 1933 with Tsuberbiller and Vedeneyeva at her bedside. Though she tried to make the trip from Moscow before Parnok died, Erarskaya did not arrive until around 5 p.m. A portrait of Tsvetaeva was on her bedside table when she died. The village druggist assisted Tsuberbiller in obtaining the necessary paperwork to take the body back to Moscow, after the funeral service in Karinskoye. Her funeral procession on 28 August with her friends and fans extended 75 kilometers outside of Moscow. They did not reach the city until the following day. She was buried in Vvedenskoye Cemetery in Olga Tsuberbiller's family plot.

After Parnok's death, her works were not available, nor was there any development of Russian scholarship about her until after the Soviet period. In 1979, the Soviet scholar, Sofia Polyakova, edited the first Collected Works of Parnok, which was published in the United States. In 1983, Polyakova published Незакатные оны дни: Цветаева и Парнок (Those Unfading Days: Tsvetaeva and Parnok, Ann Arbor, Michigan: Ardis Press), which unravelled the relationship between Tsvetaeva and Parnok, identifying Tsvetaeva's "woman friend" in her Girlfriend (Russian: Подруга) cycle for the first time. Even after the surge of interest in banned Russian poets through Glasnost policies brought about by Perestroika, Parnok remained obscure to most Russians and the Russian diaspora. Her colleagues and contemporary poets were all rehabilitated before she was. Parnok had believed the obstacle to official acceptance was her lesbianism, though there is no explicit documentation of the reason for continued censorship of her works.

A memorial plaque dedicated to the Parnok family was placed on the wall of her birth house in Taganrog in 2012. Poems by Parnok were set to music by Ukrainian composer Valentina Ramm (1888-1968), and later recorded on a CD and performed by Elena Frolova in 2002, as part of the "AZIYA +" project.

== Works ==
Parnok's works are filled with the timbre of tragedy and the melody of coincidence. Her first poem was printed in 1906 and her last, the week before her death. Her first collection Стихотворения (Poems) was published in 1916 and her last book of works Вполголоса (Half-Whispered or In a low voice) was published in 1928. She created five books of poems, more than 30 critical essays, and several translations. Sofia Polyakova, editor of Parnok's Collected Works, preserved 261 of her poems. Because she chose to live openly and write about her relationships with seven women – to each of whom she dedicated several poems – she came to be called the "Russian Sappho". Much of the scholarly work focused on Parnok has centered around the period of her relationship with Tsvetaeva; yet, many of her "best poems" were created after 1928. Nearly 100 poems, written between 1928 and 1933 were never published until long after her death. Poems from her Vedeneyeva period reflect both material and spiritual intake and musical and creative output. They incorporate the themes running through all her works: "anguish, poetry, the elements (wind, water, earth, fire), heat and cold, illness, madness, remembering, and death". Parnok's mature poetry showed a simpler use of language, shorter lines and rhythmic variation. While rejecting the Romantic poetry of previous eras, Parnok conveyed passion through the use of commonplace straightforward language. Her style employs rhetorical questioning, as if she is having conversations with herself, indicators that even in the presence of others, Parnok felt removed from them.

Стихотворения (Poems, 1916) contained 60 poems, some previously published, written from 1912, the year of her father's death, to 1915. The book was divided into five sections, though the poems were not part of specific cycles. Sections were of different lengths and dealt with death, love and poetry, love and remembrance, Russia and war, and wandering.

Розы Пиерии (Roses of Pieria, 1922) contained 20 poems, written between 1912 and 1921. They were grouped into three sections which evaluated a lesbian poet in a stylized manner, comparing her to the original lesbian poet, Sappho, as a competitor for male lovers, and as alternative rather than competitor for those who were unsatisfied with more traditional roles of lovers of either sex. Much of the imagery used in the poems depicted symbols from ancient Greek mythology and evoke images of her loss of Tsvetaeva.

Лоза (The Vine, 1923) contained 23 poems, which trace Parnok's life from her physical birth to her spiritual rebirth in Sudak. The poems trace her first awakening to poetry, her frustration at being unable to express herself as she wanted, the new ideas planted by Tsvetaeva, her failure to be able to write seriously without being distracted by love interests and life, and finally her recognition and acknowledgement that poetry was her true vocation. Her poems, were like her children, her legacy, requiring spiritual nurturing, rather than purely words inspired by sexual passion.

Русалочка (The Little Mermaid (libretto), 1923). The libretto for the opera by Yuliya Veysberg was based on the fairy tale of the same name by Hans Christian Andersen.

Музыка (Music, 1926) contained 33 poems, most of which had been previously published, which had been written between 1916 and 1925. The collection was dedicated to Tsuberbiller, though Erarskaya (known in the lyrics as Mashenka) is the most prevalent of her lover-muses in the collection. The unifying theme of music, with lyrics including instruments, musical phrases, performers, and sounds, charts the relationship of Parnok and Erarskaya from their first meeting to Mashenka's madness.

Вполголоса (Half-Whispered or In a low voice, 1928) contained 38 poems and was dedicated to Tsuberbiller. Eighteen of the poems were written in 1926 and the other twenty were written the following year. The name, literally sotto voce, reflected the dark thoughts which had pervaded her life over the period, worries of isolation, madness, and death, sprinkled with a few rare lyrics of rapture and vigor.

Алмаст (Almast, (libretto), 1930). The libretto for the opera was finished by Parnok in the winter of 1918. The prologue and epilogue were written in the spring of 1929, to convince the Bolshoi Theater management to produce the opera. The libretto stands separately on poetic footing as a high-quality, dramatic narrative.

Гюльнара (Gyul'nara (libretto), 1935). The libretto for the opera by Yuliya Veysberg was completed at the end of 1931 and was dedicated to the opera singer Maria Maksakova. As Parnok died before production, Veysberg made final edits to the lyric before its debut in 1935.

== See also ==
- Lesbian Poetry
