= Sofia Polyakova =

- Born: Sofia Viktorovna Polyakova; 26 August 1914; Petrograd, Russian Empire
- Died: April 30, 1994 (aged 79); Saint Petersburg, Russia
- Other names: Sofiâ Viktorovna Polâkova, Sofia Poliakova, Sophia Poliakova, Sophia Polyakova, S. V. Polyakova,
- Occupation: academic
- Years active: 1938–1972
- Known for: Byzantine translations and rediscovery of Sophia Parnok

Sofia Viktorovna Polyakova (Russian: София Викторовна Полякова; 1914–1994) was a Soviet classical philologist, Byzantine specialist and scholar of ancient Greek and Byzantine authors. She published the first collection of the works of the Russian poet Sophia Parnok and was the first scholar to unravel the relationship of Parnok and Marina Tsvetaeva. Her work on Parnok, revived scholarly interest in the poet.

== Early life ==
Sofia Viktorovna Polyakova (Note: Sophia Parnok's first lover-muse was Nadezhda Polyakova. It is unknown if she and Sofia Polyakova were related.) was born in Petrograd in 1914. Besides a brief period during World War II when she lived in Moscow, Polyakova spent her entire life in Saint Petersburg. In 1938, she graduated from Leningrad State University with a degree in classical philology. As soon as she graduated, Polyakova began working in the philology department as a teaching assistant. Between 1941 and 1944, she worked at the Soviet Information Bureau in Moscow, but when the war ended, she returned to Leningrad and resumed her position at the university. In 1945, she completed her thesis, Semantics of the imagery of the ancient historical epic (5th century BC - 1st century AD) and was promoted to an assistant professor.

Polyakova taught ancient Greek and Byzantine literature and was known as an expert on Byzantine translations, as well as Russian poets of the Silver Age. She was known as an exacting teacher and allowed her students to call on her at home for help with their studies. Polyakova shared an apartment with Irina Vladimirovna Felenkovskaya (Russian: Ирина Владимировна Феленковская) and their dogs. She taught at Leningrad University until 1972, retiring as soon as she was eligible. Though she enjoyed teaching, she preferred pursuing translations and studies of literary figures. Much of her work was not published in Russia in her lifetime, as she was neither worried about political correctness, nor the fact that some viewed her work as Eurocentric. In fact, she argued that cosmopolitanism developed a heightened sense of appreciation for one's homeland.

In 1979, Polyakova published София Парнок: Собрание стихотворения (Sophia Parnok: Collected Works), the first complete collection of the Russian poet, with Ardis Press of Ann Arbor, Michigan. The book was not published in the USSR and a Russian edition would not be released until 1998, after Polyakova's death. Then in 1983, she published Незакатные оны дни: Цветаева и Парнок (Those Unfading Days: Tsvetaeva and Parnok) also with Ardis Press, which was the first work by a scholar to identify Parnok as the woman friend in Marina Tsvetaeva's Girlfriend cycle. Later scholars of both women poets, like Diana Burgin and Simon Karlinsky drew heavily from Polyakova's work in their biographies and her scholarship revived academic interest in Parnok in both the United States and later in Russia.

== Death and legacy ==
Polyakova died from heart disease on 30 April 1994 in Saint Petersburg. Posthumously several of her works were published and her papers were filed at the Russian State Archive of Literature and Art.

== Selected works ==
- Камениата, Иоанн; et al. (1959). Две византийские хроники X века: Псамафийская хроника [Two Byzantine Chronicles of the 10th Century] (in Russian). Translated by Полякова, С. В.; Феленковска, И. В. Moscow: Издательство восточной литературы. OCLC 496639327.
- Полякова, С. В. (1965). Византийская любовная проза [Byzantine love prose] (in Russian). Moscow, USSR: Наука. OCLC 829705599.
- Полякова, С.В.; Лихачев, Дмитрий Сергеевич (1972). Византийские легенды [Byzantine legends] (in Russian). Leningrad, USSR: Akademija Nauk. OCLC 71567546.
- Парнок, София (1979). Полякова, С. В. (ed.). София Парнок: собрание стихотворений Подробнее [Sophia Parnok: Collected Works] (in Russian). Ann Arbor, Michigan: Ardis Press.
- Полякова, Софья Викторовна; Юзбашян, Карен Никитич (1979). Из истории византийского романа опыт интерпретации "Повести об Исмине и Исмини" Евмафия Макремволита [From the history of the Byzantine novel, the experience of the interpretation of "The Tale of Ismina and Ismini" by Eumafia Makremvolita] (in Russian). Moscow, USSR: Наука. OCLC 491119242.
- Polâkova, Sofiâ Viktorovna (1980). Средневековые латинские новеллы XIII в [Medieval Latin novels of the XIII century] (in Russian). Leningrad, USSR: Nauka. OCLC 891228209.
- Полякова, С.В. (1983). Незакатные оны дни: Цветаева и Парнок [Those Unfading Days: Tsvetaeva and Parnok] (in Russian). Ann Arbor, Michigan: Ardis Press. OCLC 560988563.
- Полякова, С.В.; Феленковская, И. В. (1986). Византийский сатирический диалог [Byzantine satirical dialogue] (in Russian). Leningrad, USSR: Akademija Nauk. OCLC 16260029.
- Полякова, С. В.; Юзбашян, Карен Никитич (1988). "Метаморфозы", или, "Золотой осел" Апулея ["Metamorphosis", or "The Golden Onager" of Apuleius] (in Russian). Moscow, USSR: Изд-во "Наука," Глав. ред. восточной лит-ры.
- Полякова, Софья Викторовна (1992). Осип Мандельштам: наблюдения, интерпретации, неопубликованное и забытое [Osip Mandelstam: observations, interpretations, unpublished and forgotten] (in Russian). Ann Arbor, Michigan: Ardis Press. OCLC 236171973.
- Полякова, Софья Викторовна (1995). Жития византийских святых [Lives of the Byzantine Saints] (in Russian). Saint Peterburg, Russia: Корвус. ISBN 978-5-7921-0051-0.

=== Posthumous ===
- Парнок, София (1998). Полянин, Андрей; Полякова, С. В. (eds.). София Парнок: собрание стихотворений [Sophia Parnok: Collected Works] (in Russian) (Revised and updated ed.). Saint Petersburg, Russia: Inapress. ISBN 978-5-87135-045-4.
- Полякова, С. В. (1997). "Олейников об Олейникове" и другие работы по русской литературе ["Oleynikov on Oleynikov" and other works on Russian literature] (in Russian). Saint Petersburg, Russia: Инапресс. ISBN 978-5-871-35034-8.
