= Olga Tsuberbiller =

Russian mathematician

- Born: Olga Nikolaevna Gubonina; 19 September 1885; Moscow, Russian Empire
- Died: 28 September 1975 (aged 90); Moscow, USSR
- Other names: Olga Nikolaevna Tsuberbiller, O. N. Tsuberbiller, О.N. Zuberbiller
- Occupation: Mathematician
- Years active: 1908-1969
- Notable work: Problems and Exercises in Analytic Geometry

Olga Tsuberbiller (Russian: Ольга Николаевна Цубербиллер, 19 September [O.S. 7 September] 1885 - 28 September 1975) was a Russian mathematician noted for her creation of the textbook Problems and Exercises in Analytic Geometry. The book has been used as a standard text for high schools since its creation in 1927. Sophia Parnok, noted Russian poet dedicated her verses in the Half-voiced cycle to Tsuberbiller, and the educator cared for Parnok during her final illness, later becoming her literary executor. She later became the partner of the noted opera singer, Concordia Antarova. Tsuberbiller was designated as an Honored Scientist of the Russian Soviet Federative Socialist Republic in 1955.

== Early life ==
Olga Nikolaevna Gubonina (Russian: Ольга Николаевна Губонина) was born on 7 September 1885 in Moscow to Nadezhda Konstantinovna Artyukhova (Russian: Надежда Константиновна Артюхова) and Nikolai Petrovich Gubonin (Russian: Николай Петрович Губонин). Her mother was engaged in farming and her father was employed by the Chinese Eastern Railway. She was the granddaughter of the industrialist Pyotr Ionovich Gubonin and spent at least part of her youth on the family's estate at Gurzuf. The resort, which now makes up Gurzuf was founded by Gubonina's grandfather and uncle, Sergei Gubonin (Russian: Сергей Петрович Губонин). The two designed the 93 hotels and summer cottages with the assistance of the architect Platon Konstantinovich Terebenev (Russian: Платон Константинович Теребенев) and it quickly became a favorite place of writers, as it had been in earlier years for Alexander Pushkin. Her older brother, Pyotr Nikolaevich, namesake of both her grandfather and father, was in the Russian Navy and wounded at the Battle of Chemulpo Bay during the Russo-Japanese War and went on to serve in World War I. Little is known of her childhood, but she graduated from the Bestuzhev Courses in 1908.

== Career ==
Gubonina immediately began teaching analytical geometry in the Bestuzhev Courses under the direction of B. K. Mlodzievsky. At some point she married and was widowed during the Russian Civil War, thereafter going by the surname Tsuberbiller. Tsuberbiller was dedicated to her students' education, establishing both a mathematics library and reading room to facilitate further study. She counseled and tutored students and worked to popularize the study of math, while she was working in the women's courses. In the 1920s, she began teaching at the First Moscow State University. At the beginning of 1923, Tsuberbiller met and became friends with Sophia Parnok. The exact nature of her relationship with Parnok is unknown as, while she occupied a significant place in the poet's life, Parnok did not describe Tsuberbiller in the same sexual context as her lovers. Instead, Tsuberbiller was a protector, as expressed in the poem cycle Half-voiced, which describes Tsuberbiller as a type of guardian angel. By 1925, she had become Parnok's closest friend, and when Parnok's lover Lyudmila Vladimirovna Erarskaya was hospitalized for a mental break, Tsuberbiller was the one to whom Parnok turned to regain her equilibrium. The following year, Parnok moved in with Tsuberbiller on Neopalimovsky Lane at Smolensky Boulevard, though Tsuberbiller was already overworked, providing care for both her mother and her brother, who was at the time unemployed.

In 1927, Tsuberbiller published the first edition of Задачи и упражнения по аналитической геометрии (Problems and Exercises in Analytic Geometry), which became a standard text in Soviet high schools. The book has been reprinted in Russian more than thirty-five times and has been translated into Chinese, Czech, German, and Polish. It is still a standard text in Russian high schools and technical institutions. That same year, when Nina Vedeneyeva's son was banished from his studies, Tsuberbiller provided him with textbooks so that he could continue his mathematics preparations, which may have been the event when Vedeneyeva and Parnok met. By 1928, Parnok had begun to have serious health issues and Tsuberbiller, who was also ill took her to Novhorod-Siverskyi in Ukraine for the summer. The following spring, her brother died and his twin daughters became Tsuberbiller's obligation. In 1930, Tsuberbiller became a professor at the Institute of Fine Chemical Technology and at the end of that same year, she and Parnok moved to a new apartment on Nikitsky Boulevard with more room where the couple could regularly entertain colleagues of Tsuberbiller's.

Tsuberbiller indulged Parnok and allowed her freedom, so in 1931 when Parnok fell into an unreciprocated passion for Maria Maksakova and then the following year became intimate with Vedeneyeva, she remained silent about the affairs. During Parnok's last, fatal illness, she continued living with Tsuberbiller, who was with Parnok and Vedeneyeva when the poet died in August 1933. Tsuberbiller took responsibility for Parnok's literary estate upon Parnok's death. Soon after Parnok' death, Tsuberbiller began a relationship with Concordia Antarova, a noted opera singer who later became interested in Theosophy and published books. In 1936, she was promoted to department head of Higher Mathematics and served in that post until 1965. Between 1943 and 1966, she also served as head of the Department of Geometry at Moscow University.

Tsuberbiller became one of the Honored Scientists of the Russian Soviet Federative Socialist Republic in 1955. As she had with Parnok, Tsuberbiller took care of Antarova through various illnesses until her death in 1959. She retired from the university in 1969.

== Death and legacy ==
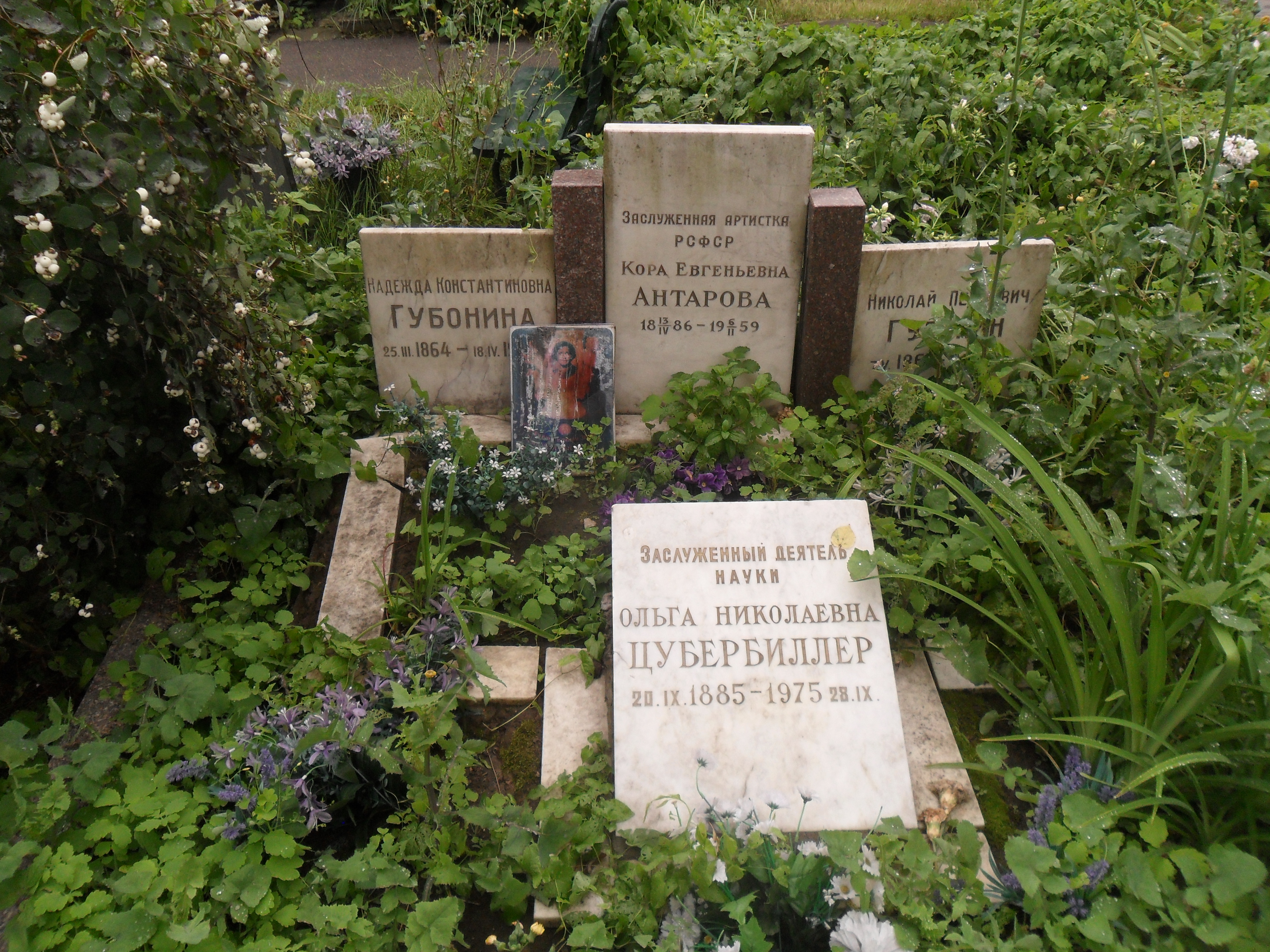
Antarova and Tsuberbiller's grave

Tsuberbiller died on 28 September 1975 in Moscow and was buried in the Novodevichy Cemetery near Antarova. In 2014, Tsuberbiller's portrait was painted by Boston-based artist Ria Brodell for their series Butch Heroes, which celebrates "people who were assigned female at birth, but who presented as masculine, and had documented relationships with women." The collection was exhibited at Gallery Kayafas in Boston in 2017.

== Works ==
- Цубербиллер, О. Н. (2009). Задачи и упражнения по аналитической геометрии (in Russian) (34th ed.). Moscow, Russia: Лань. ISBN 978-5-8114-0475-9.
