= Mary Birshtein =

Russian social scientist

Mary Mironovna Birshtein (1902, St Petersburg – 1992) was a Soviet social scientist noted for the development of simulation and gaming techniques for use in business and research environments. She is known as the "mother of simulation gaming" following her adaptation of wargames to business games in 1932. Her first game was based in a typewriter factory and was used to train managers in how to handle production problems. She was first affiliated to the Bureau of Scientific Organisation of Labour.
