= Mikhail Volkenstein =

Mikhail Vladimirovich Volkenshtein (Михаи́л Влади́мирович Волькенште́йн) (October 23, 1912 – February 18, 1992) was a notable Soviet and Russian biophysicist, Corresponding Member of the Russian Academy of Sciences, Professor and Doctor of Sciences. In his publications in English his name is written as M. V. Volkenstein.

== Career ==
He was Head of the Department of the Institute of Molecular Biology of the Russian Academy of Sciences, Professor of the Moscow State University, member of the Editorial Board of the Journal "Molekuliarnaya Biologia" of the Russian Academy of Sciences, winner of the State Prize of the former Soviet Union.

Volkenshtein created the Leningrad school of polymer science in the early 1950. Tatiana Birshtein who specialised in the theoretical physics of polymers came to work there and she headed the Institute of Macromolecular Compounds.

Volkenshtein was author of many important scientific articles and monographs in the fields of Quantum Biophysics, Chemistry of Biopolymers, etc. He was one of the authors of the Quantum-Mechanical Model of Enzyme Catalysis.

=== Main works ===
- M.V. Volkenshtein, R.R. Dogonadze, A.K. Madumarov, Z.D. Urushadze and Yu.I. Kharkats, "Theory of Enzyme Catalysis".- "Molekuliarnaya Biologia", Moscow, 6, 1972, pp. 431-439 (in Russian, English summary)
- M.V. Volkenshtein, R.R. Dogonadze, A.K. Madumarov, Z.D. Urushadze and Yu.I. Kharkats, "Electronic and Conformational Interactions in Enzyme Catalysis".- In: E.L. Andronikashvili (Ed.), "Konformatsionnie Izmenenia Biopolimerov v Rastvorakh", Publishing House "Nauka", Moscow, 1973, pp. 153-157 (in Russian, English summary)
- M.V. Volkenshtein, "Molecules and Life: An Introduction to Molecular Biology", Plenum Pub. Corp., 1974
- M.V. Volkenshtein, "Biophysics", Publishing House "Mir", Moscow, 1983 (in English)

== Honours and awards ==
- Order of the Red Banner of Labour
- Order of the Badge of Honour
- Medal "For Valiant Labour in the Great Patriotic War 1941–1945"
- Medal "In Commemoration of the 250th Anniversary of Leningrad"
- Stalin Prize

== See also ==
- Biophysics
- Enzyme
