= Tatiana Birshtein =

Russian molecular scientist (1928–2022)

- Born: 20 December 1928; Leningrad, RSFSR, USSR
- Died: 23 February 2022 (aged 93); Saint Petersburg, Russia

Tatiana Birshtein or Tat'yana Maksimovna Birshtein (Russian: Татья́на Макси́мовна Бирште́йн, 20 December 1928 – 23 February 2022) was a Russian molecular scientist. Birshtein specialised in the physics of polymers. In 2007 she was given the L'Oréal-UNESCO Award for Women in Science.

== Life and career ==
Birshtein was born in Leningrad (now Saint Petersburg) in 1928. She survived Siege of Leningrad. She attended Leningrad State University.

Birshtein specialised in the theoretical physics of polymers in Saint Petersburg at the Institute of Macromolecular Compounds of the Russian Academy of Sciences. This institution had been created as part of Professor Mikhail Volkenstein's 1950s Leningrad school of polymer science. The institution was synonymous with Birshtein and she is said to have dedicated her life to science.

She has published extensively on polymers, DNA stability, micelle structure, as well as structures of organic molecules.

On 22 February 2007, she was awarded $100,000, when she was given the L'Oréal-UNESCO Award for Women in Science. The award was for her "contribution to the understanding of the shapes, sizes and motions of large molecules".

Birshtein died on 23 February 2022, at the age of 93.

== Awards ==
- Medal "For the Defence of Leningrad" (1944)
- Honoured Scientist of the Russian Federation (1998)
- Award named after V. A. Kargin RAS (2008)
