= Nina Vedeneyeva =

Soviet physicist

- 1932
- Born: Nina Evgenievna Vedeneyeva; 1 December 1882; Tbilisi, Caucasus Viceroyalty, Russian Empire
- Died: 31 December 1955 (aged 73); Moscow, USSR
- Other names: Nina Yevgenyevna Vedeneyeva, Nina Vedeneeva, Nina Sirotinsky-Vedeneyeva
- Occupation: physicist
- Years active: 1914-1955
- Known for: Crystallography

Nina Evgenievna Vedeneyeva (Russian: Нина Евгеньевна Веденеева; 1 December 1882 – 31 December 1955) was a Soviet physicist involved in the study of mineral crystals and their coloration. Heading numerous departments at such institutions as the All-USSR Institute of Mineral Resources, the Institute of Geological Sciences and the Institute of Crystallography, she conducted research into color variants of clay minerals and classifying clays which occurred in organic dyes. She was noted for development and design of instruments to improve the methods of optical crystallography. She was the last partner-muse of the poet Sophia Parnok and was awarded the Stalin Prize and Order of Lenin for her scientific studies and inventions.

== Early life ==
Nina Evgenievna Vedeneyeva was born on 1 December 1882 in Tbilisi, capital of the Caucasus Viceroyalty, Russian Empire to Pelageya Ivanovna (née Avdeyeva) (Russian: Пелагея Ивановна Авдеева) and Evgeny Lvovich Vedeneyev (Russian: Евгений Львович Веденеев). Vedeneyeva had three siblings: Olga (born 1880), who became a musician and lived in Japan; Boris (ru) (1885-1946) who was a hydraulic engineer and academician; and Maria (1887-1958) Russian: Мария Евгеньевна Успенская-Веденеева, who became an architect in Leningrad. After completion of her studies at gymnasium, Vedeneyeva with the encouragement of her father went abroad to study architecture in Belgium. Headed for Ghent, she stopped in Liège and met her future husband, Leonid Ivanovich Sirotinsky almost immediately. He was a student at the Liege Electro-Technical Institute and Vedeneyeva then changed her plans and entered the same school. In January 1902, her father was murdered and she returned home until spring. After a year of studies, Vedeneyeva left school and on 28 July 1903 at the Russian Orthodox Church in Brussels, she and Sirotinsky married. He finished his studies and the couple returned to his parental home in Nikolaev, where their son, Yevgeny was born at the end of the year.

== Career ==
In 1907, Vedeneyeva entered the Chemical Department of the Bestuzhev Courses and graduated in 1912-13, receiving her degree from the USSR Academy of Sciences in 1912 and passing her examination at Moscow University in 1913. In 1914, she began teaching and conducting research in the Bestuzhev Courses, which would later merge with Second Moscow State University and at the Institute of Fine Chemical Technology. In 1915, she enrolled in the Mathematics Department and passed her examination in 1916. She continued teaching first chemistry, then courses on atomic matter, radioactivity and pedagogy until 1919 at Second University. In that year, she divorced Sirotinsky and went on holiday with Eugenia Avramenko (Russian: Евгении Ивановны Авраменко) to Nikolaev again, where her son was living. Unable to return to Moscow because of Anton Denikin's offensive against the city, she and Avramenko proceeded Avramenko's home town and found employment working in Women's Gymnasium in Melitopol for the next two years.

Beginning in 1921, both Vedeneyeva and Avramenko taught at the Moscow State Forest University. Vedeneyva taught physics there until she was transferred in 1925 to Leningrad. Avramenko was also transferred to Leningrad in 1925. The following year, Vedeneyva's son, Yevgeny, who was a student at the Moscow Higher Technical School, was arrested and charged as an enemy of the state for participating in scouting, a banned activity. After spending six months at the Solovki prison camp, he was barred from living in any of Russia's major cities and sent in exile to Glazov. It was probably in this period in 1927, when Vedeneyeva met Sophia Parnok, as Parnok's partner at the time, Olga Nikolaevna Tsuberbiller, was a colleague of Vedeneyeva. Tsuberbiller was a mathematician and had written the standard textbook used for several decades in the high schools of the USSR. She assisted Vedeneyeva in obtaining the textbooks Yevgeny needed to complete his mathematics degree. In 1929, he continued his exile in Tver and was not allowed to return to Moscow until 1931.

In 1930, Vedeneyeva became the department head of crystal optics at the All-USSR Institute of Mineral Resources in Moscow. The following year, she also began conducting scientific research at Giredmet, the State Research and Design Institute of Rare Metals. She worked on some of the first studies of anomalous dispersion, studying nature of the colorations of both natural and synthetic transparent crystals. In 1932, she moved out of the apartment she had shared since 1918 with Avramenko, moved in with her son, and around the same time her relationship with Parnok intensified. Between January 1932 and August 1933, Parnok wrote thirty poems in two cycles to Vedeneyeva. The first cycle, containing seven poems, was called Ursa Major and the second, containing an additional twenty-three poems was called Useless Goods. The poems are a lyric diary of their affair and are openly erotic poems addressed to her lover, making full use of double entendre to taunt potential censors. Parnok continued living with Tsuberbiller and Vedeneyeva visited her almost daily until her death. The relationship was intense and in the beginning, Vedeneyeva was reticent about the physical relationship. It may have been her first lesbian relationship.

Vedeneyeva was with Parnok and Tsuberbiller when Parnok died in 1933 and she fell into a depression. Traveling alone in the summer of 1934 to Armenia, she sought to restore herself, but the depression returned in 1936 and she took a retreat at the beginning of 1936 to sanatorium near Moscow and then in the summer another solo trip to Sudak. Returning to Moscow, Vedeneyeva completed her doctorate in Physical and Mathematical Sciences in 1937 and moved to the Institute of Geological Sciences of the National Academy of Sciences of the USSR to head the optical section in 1941. Working with the Red Army Engineering Unit, she developed a method of spectrophotometry to be used in the field which dealt with the problem of color masking due to crystallographic defects. When the war ended, in 1945, Vedeneyeva became the supervisor of the Crystal Optics Laboratory at the Institute of Crystallography. That same year, she was awarded the Order of the Badge of Honour.

Vedeneyeva's research continued, with the study of smoky quartz. She evaluated the absorption and luminescence process of the quartz, and the interrelation of them to its thermoluminescent properties. She also evaluated the adsorption of organic dyes upon thiazine and barium nitrate crystals, as well as upon lead and strontium. She developed and designed instruments which improved the methods of crystal-optical examination and developed methods to classify and diagnose clay minerals and clays found in organic dyes. In 1952, Vedeneyeva was awarded the Stalin Prize in the third degree for inventions and improvements in methods of production in the field of exploration and mining and in 1954, she was presented with the Order of Lenin.

== Death and legacy ==
Vedeneyeva died in Moscow on 31 December 1955 a few months after her friend Avramenko. Her research methods and inventions were widely used in geology in both Russia and abroad. The papers relating to the work of Vedeneyeva are located at the Moscow State University of Fine Chemical Technologies.

== Further research ==
- Реферативный журнал. геология [Abstracts journal: Geology] (in Russian). Vol. 9–12. Moscow, Russia: Институт научной информации (Академия наук СССР), ВИНИТИ. 1958. p. 2.
- Записки Всесоюзного минералогического общества [Notes of the All-Union Mineralogical Society] (in Russian). Leningrad, USSR: Императорское Минералогическое Общество. 1955.
