= Koktebel =

Koktebel Коктебель Köktöbel
- Urban-type settlement (de facto); Rural settlement (de jure)
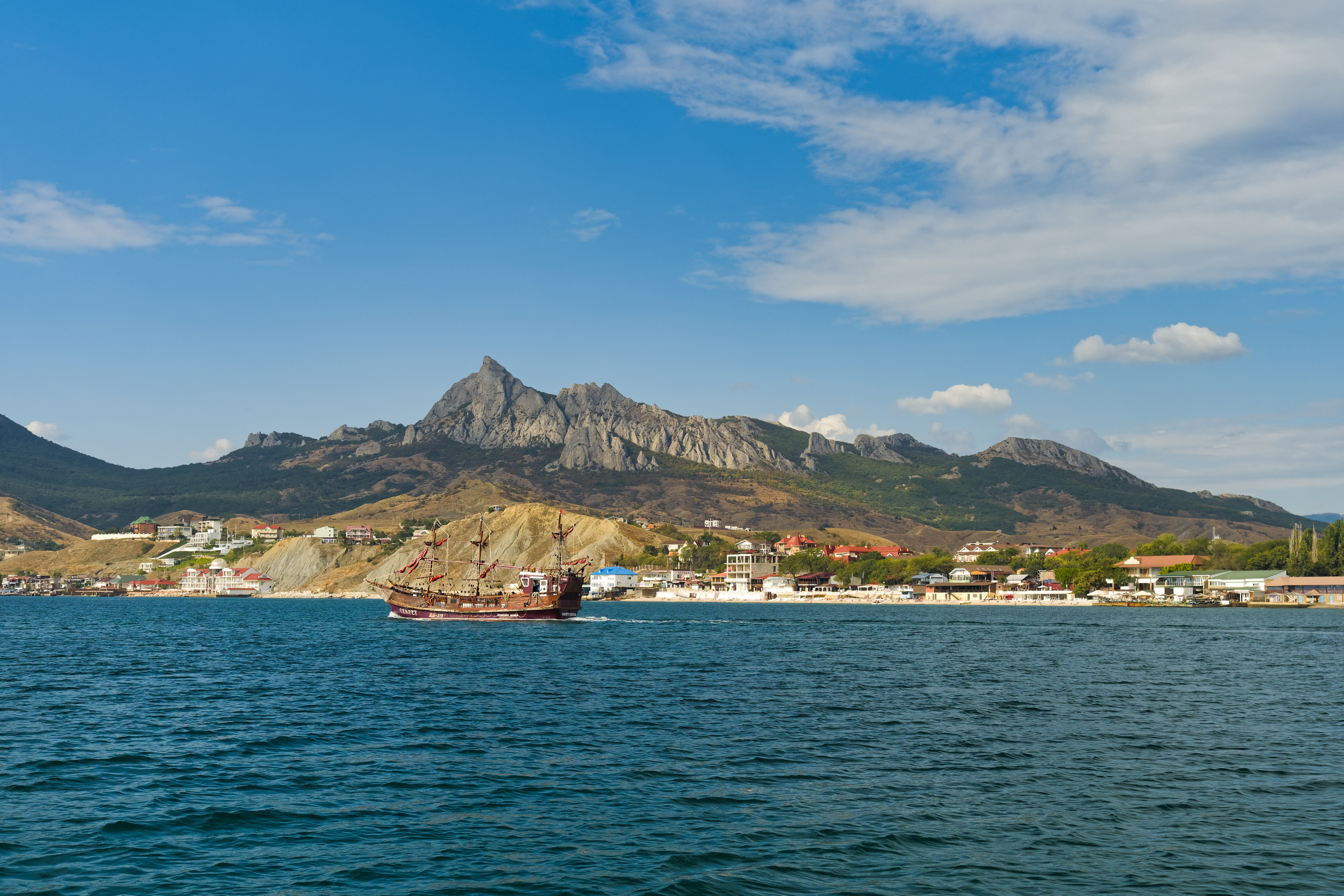
- Shoreline of Koktebel
- Interactive map of Koktebel
- Location of Koktebel within Crimea Koktebel (Ukraine)
- Coordinates: 44°57′36″N 35°14′26″E
- Country (de jure): Ukraine
- Republic (de jure): (Autonomous Republic of Crimea) AR Crimea
- Raion (de jure): Feodosia Raion
- Country (de facto): Russia
- Federal Subject (de facto): (Autonomous Republic of Crimea) Republic of Crimea
- Municipality: Feodosia Municipality

Area
  - Total: 8.71168 km^{2} (3.36360 sq mi)
- Elevation: 30 m (98 ft)

Population (2014)
  - Total: 2,807
  - Density: 322/km^{2} (830/sq mi)
- Time zone: UTC+4 (MSK)
- Postal code: 298186
- Area code: +7 36562
- Former name: Planerskoye (1945 - 1991)
- Climate: Cfa

Koktebel (Ukrainian and Russian: Коктебéль, Crimean Tatar: Köktöbel), in 1945–1992 known as Planerske or Planerskoye, (Ukrainian: Планерське, Russian: Планерское) is an urban-type settlement and one of the most popular resort townlets in southeastern Crimea. Koktebel is situated on the shore of the Black Sea about halfway between Feodosia and Sudak and is subordinated to the Feodosia Municipality. The population is 2,807 (2014 Census).

== History ==
It is best known for its literary associations. The Russian poet Maximilian Voloshin made it his residence, where he entertained many distinguished guests, including Marina Tsvetayeva, Osip Mandelshtam, and Andrey Bely (who died there). They all wrote remarkable poems in Koktebel. Another prominent literary resident of Koktebel was Ilya Ehrenburg who lived there circa 1919 while escaping from anti-Semitic riots in Kiev.

The name Köktöbel is of Turkic origin: in Crimean Tatar it means “Land of the blue hills” (from kök, “sky blue”, and töbe, “hill” or “mountain”, composed with the collective suffix -el).

After the deportation of Crimean Tatars by the Soviet regime in 1944, the city's name was changed from Koktebel to russified Planerskoye (it comes from the Russian planer, or glider) or Planerske in Ukrainian. The hills above the shoreline were the site of many early experiments in manned heavier-than-air flight by Russian pioneer aviators. The local airfield is still known as Planerskoye. In 1992, the name of Koktebel was restored.

The 2003 film of the same name by Boris Khlebnikov and Aleksei Popogrebsky follows the journey of a father and son as they try to reach Koktebel from Moscow.

Koktebel was known as a vacation spot for writers in the Soviet Union. It is also famous for its brandy, its hang-gliding and its naturist beach, largest in the former USSR.

Nowadays, Koktebel fills up in the summer with tourists from Russia and until the 2014 Russian annexation of Crimea also from Ukraine and the European Union. Rubles and dollars are readily exchanged in kiosks along the beaches. There is a mixture of public beaches and private beaches with a paved walkway all along the bay. This walkway is lined with small restaurants, cafes, kiosks, and small market areas selling arts and crafts, dried fish, or slices of home-baked cake. In the evening, the beachfront comes alive with many small discos offering music, beer and shashlik. The cuisine is predominantly Tatar but Russian and Ukrainian food is also on offer. There are boat excursions, horse-riding and trips to a nearby monastery or to the cognac factory. Accommodation is either in a small hotel or in one of the hundreds of guesthouses run by local residents. It seems as though the whole population has turned into innkeepers in the summer.

Koktebel is nowadays also well known for its jazz festival that usually takes place in the middle of September. It lures the attention of jazz-lovers from the whole ex-USSR. Cast from the festival in past years included De-Phazz, Nino Katamadze, Stanley Clarke, Billy Cobham and many other famous jazz and world music performers. But the festival's 2014 edition was held in Zatoka and Bilhorod-Dnistrovskyi (both in Odesa Oblast).

== See also ==
- Roads to Koktebel
