= Karabanovo, Vladimir Oblast =

Town in Vladimir Oblast, Russia

Karabanovo Карабаново
- Town
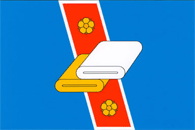
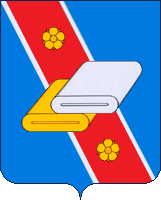
- Flag Coat of arms
- Interactive map of Karabanovo
- Location of Karabanovo Karabanovo (Vladimir Oblast)
- Coordinates: 56°19′N 38°42′E
- Country: Russia
- Federal subject: Vladimir Oblast
- Administrative district: Alexandrovsky District
- Founded: 1846
- Town status since: 1938

Area
  - Total: 11.4 km^{2} (4.4 sq mi)
- Elevation: 170 m (560 ft)

Population (2010 Census)
  - Total: 14,868
  - Estimate (2021): 13,150 (−11.6%)
  - Density: 1,300/km^{2} (3,380/sq mi)

Municipal status
  - Municipal district: Alexandrovsky Municipal District
  - Urban settlement: Karabanovo Urban Settlement
  - Capital of: Karabanovo Urban Settlement
- Time zone: UTC+3 (MSK)
- Postal code: 142439
- OKTMO ID: 17605105001

Karabanovo (Russian: Караба́ново) is a town in Alexandrovsky District of Vladimir Oblast, Russia, located on the left bank of the Seraya River (a tributary of the Sherna in Klyazma's drainage basin), 110 kilometers (68 mi) west of Vladimir, the administrative center of the oblast. Population: 13,150 (2021 census); 14,868 (2010 census); 16,015 (2002 census); 17,456 (1989 Soviet census).

== History ==
It was founded in 1846 as a settlement serving the dye works. Town status was granted to it in 1938.

== Administrative and municipal status ==
Within the framework of administrative divisions, Karabanovo is directly subordinated to Alexandrovsky District. As a municipal division, the town of Karabanovo is incorporated within Alexandrovsky Municipal District as Karabanovo Urban Settlement.
