= Maximilian Voloshin =

Russian poet (1877–1932)

Maximilian Alexandrovich Kirienko-Voloshin
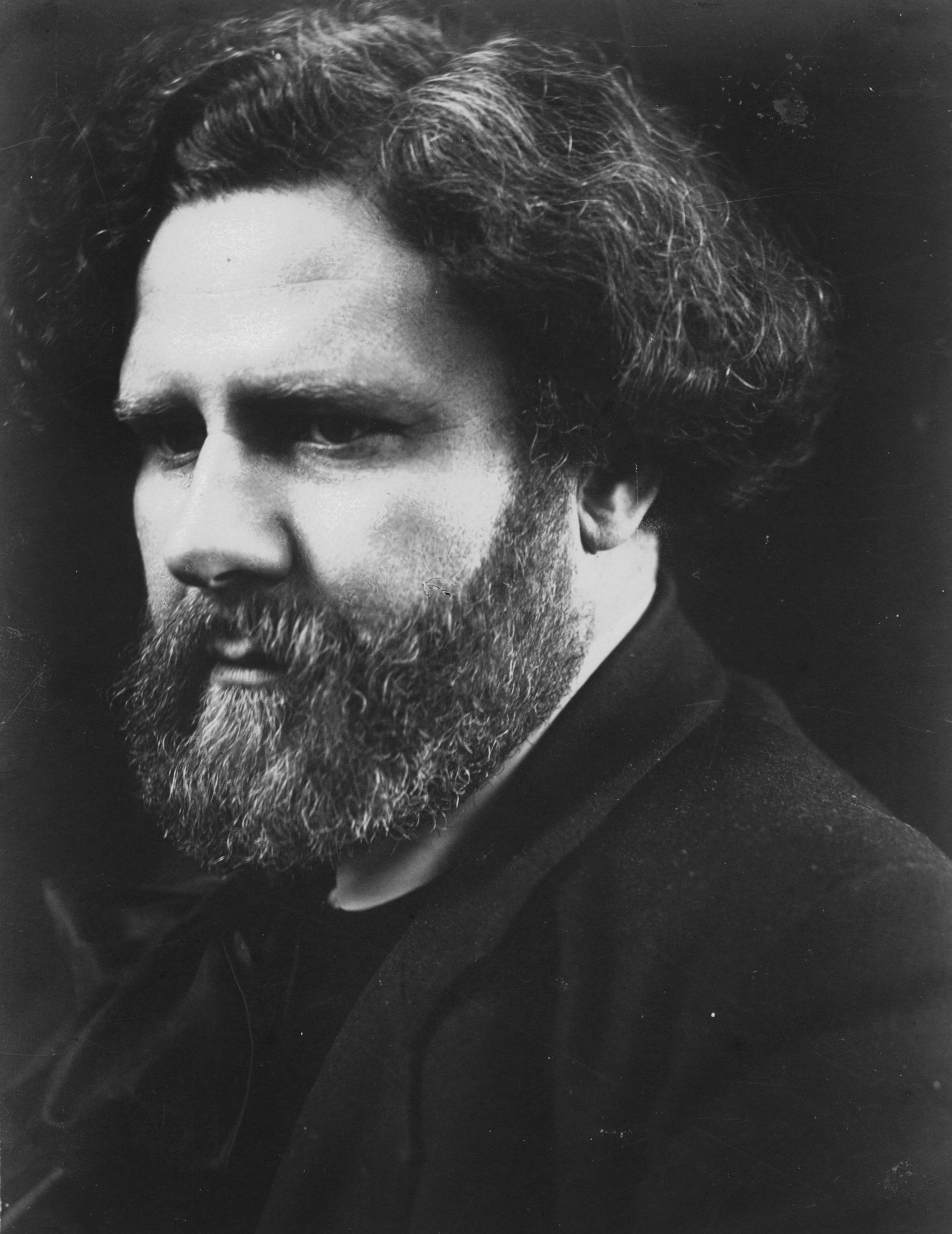
- Voloshin c. 1920s
- Born: 28 May 1877; Kiev, Russian Empire (now Ukraine)
- Died: August 11, 1932 (aged 55); Koktebel, USSR
- Occupation: Poet
- Writing career
- Literary movement: Symbolist movement

Maximilian Alexandrovich Kirienko-Voloshin (Russian: Максимилиа́н Алекса́ндрович Кирие́нко-Воло́шин; May 28, [O.S. May 16] 1877 – August 11, 1932), commonly known as Max Voloshin, was a Russian poet. He was one of the significant representatives of the symbolist movement in Russian culture and literature. He became famous as a poet and a critic of literature and the arts, being published in many contemporary magazines of the early 20th century, including Vesy, Zolotoye runo ('The Golden Fleece'), and Apollon. He was known for his translations of a number of French poetic and prose works into Russian.

== Biography ==
=== Early life ===
Voloshin was born in Kiev in 1877. He spent his early childhood in Sevastopol and Taganrog. Reportedly, "his schooling included a few years at the Polivanov establishment and a school in the Crimea, where in 1893 his mother had bought a cheap plot of land at Koktebel." After secondary school, Voloshin entered Moscow University during "a time of the resurgence of the radical student movement in Russia." Voloshin reportedly actively participated in it, "which resulted in his expulsion from the University in 1899."

Not discouraged, Voloshin "resumed his travels the length and breadth of Russia, often on foot." In 1900, he worked with an expedition surveying the route of the Orenburg-Tashkent Railway. He described this period in his life as:

The last year of the hateful 19th century was coming to an end; 1900 was the year of Vladimir Solovyov's Three Talks and his letter on the end of world history, the year of the Boxer Rebellion in China, a year when in different parts of Russia, several Russian boys, who later became poets and carriers of its spirit, clearly and tangibly felt the changes of the times. In the steppes and deserts of Turkestan, where I led camel caravans, I went through the same experiences in the same days as Blok in the Shakhmatovo swamps, and Bely at the walls of the Novodevichy Convent.

Upon his return to Moscow, Voloshin did not seek reinstatement at the university, but continued his travels to such places as Western Europe, Greece, Turkey, and Egypt. Reportedly, "his stay in Paris and travels all over France had a particularly deep effect on" him and he came back to Russia "a veritable Parisian." While during this time in Russia there were "numerous literary groups and trends, known as the Silver Age," Voloshin remained aloof despite "being a close friend of many outstanding cultural figures of the day". In verses devoted to Valery Bryusov he wrote: "In your world, I am a passerby, close to all and yet a stranger to all."

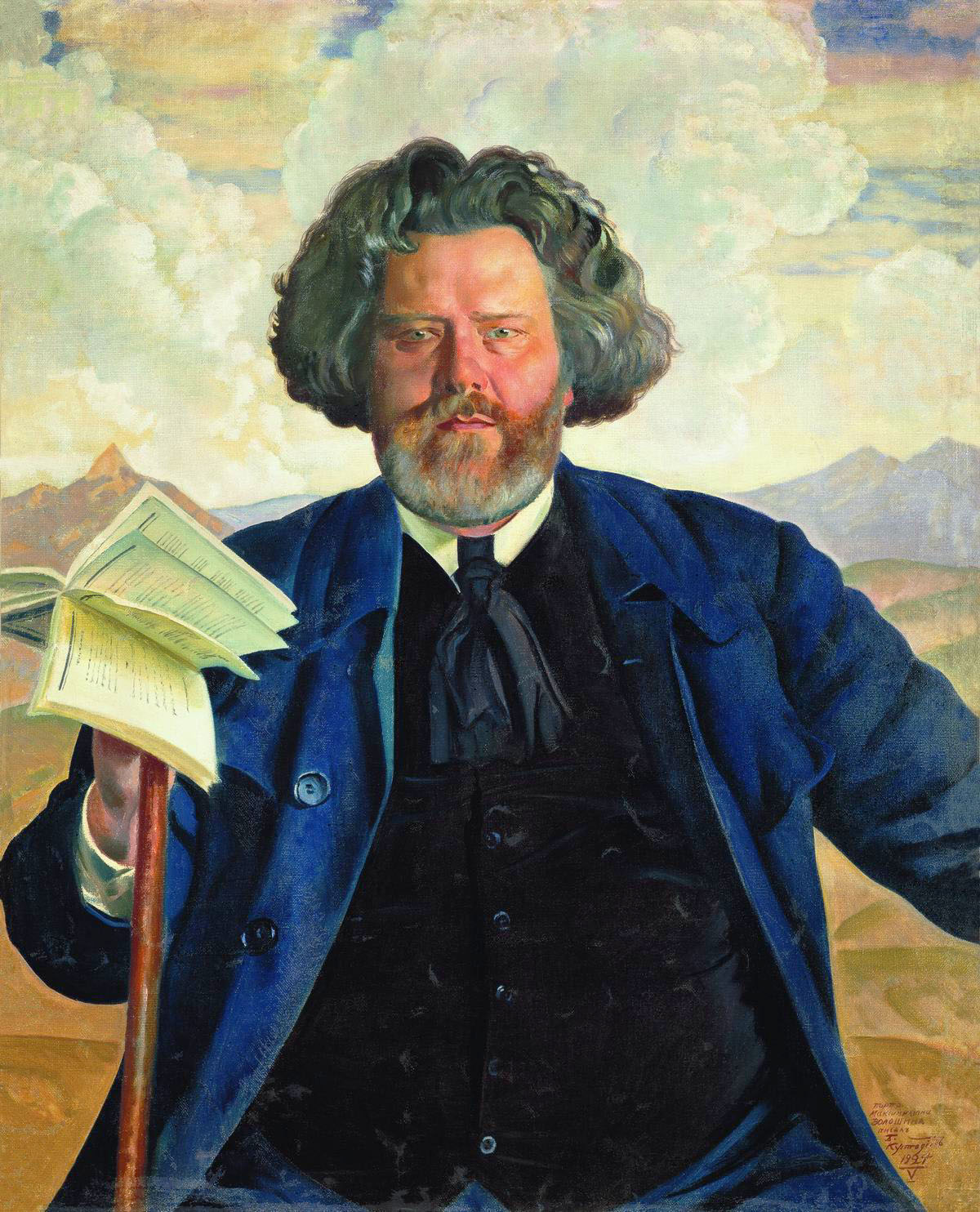
Maximilian Voloshin by Boris Kustodiev (1924)

When "a madman" ripped Repin's famous canvas Ivan the Terrible Killing His Son with a knife, shocking Intellectual Russia, Voloshin was the only person in the country to defend the man, "indicating that it was an esthetic statement appropriate to the painting, which displayed gore and bad taste". Voloshin had a brief affair with Miss Sabashnikova, but they soon broke up, and this had a profound effect on his work. Gradually, Voloshin was drawn back to Koktebel in the Crimea, where he had spent much of his childhood. His first collection of poetry appeared in 1910, soon followed by others. His collected essays were published in 1914.

=== Life and work ===
During the years of the First World War, Voloshin, in Switzerland at the time, showed himself to be an author of profoundly insightful poems, engaging in a philosophically- and historically-based exploration of the tragic events of his contemporary Russia. He was known for his humanism, appealing "in the days of revolutions to be a human, not a citizen" and "in the disturbances of wars to realize the oneness. To be not a part, but all: not from one side, but from both."

Eventually Voloshin made it back to France, where he stayed until 1916. A year before the February Revolution in Russia, Voloshin returned to his home country and settled in Koktebel. He would live there until the end of his life. The ensuing Civil War prompted Voloshin to write long poems linking what was happening in Russia to its distant, mythologized past. Later, Voloshin would be accused of the worst sin in the Soviet ideologue's book: keeping aloof from the political struggle between Reds and Whites. In fact, he tried to protect the Whites from the Reds and the Reds from the Whites. His house, today a museum, still has a clandestine niche in which he hid people whose lives were in danger.

Reportedly, "never were a poet's works so closely bound up with the place where he lived. He recreated the semi-mythical world of the Cimmerii in pictures and verses. He painted landscapes of primeval eastern Crimea. Nature itself seemed to respond to Voloshin's art. If one looks west from the Voloshin Museum, there is a mountain whose shape is uncannily similar to Voloshin's profile."

Miraculously, Voloshin survived the Civil War, and in the 1920s set up a free rest home for writers in his house, in accordance with his rejection of private property. Yet he continued to draw most of his inspiration from solitude and contemplation of nature.

During the latter years of his life, he gained additional recognition as a subtle water-colour painter. Many of his art works now belong to museums around the world, while others are kept in private collections in Russia and abroad.

== Legacy ==
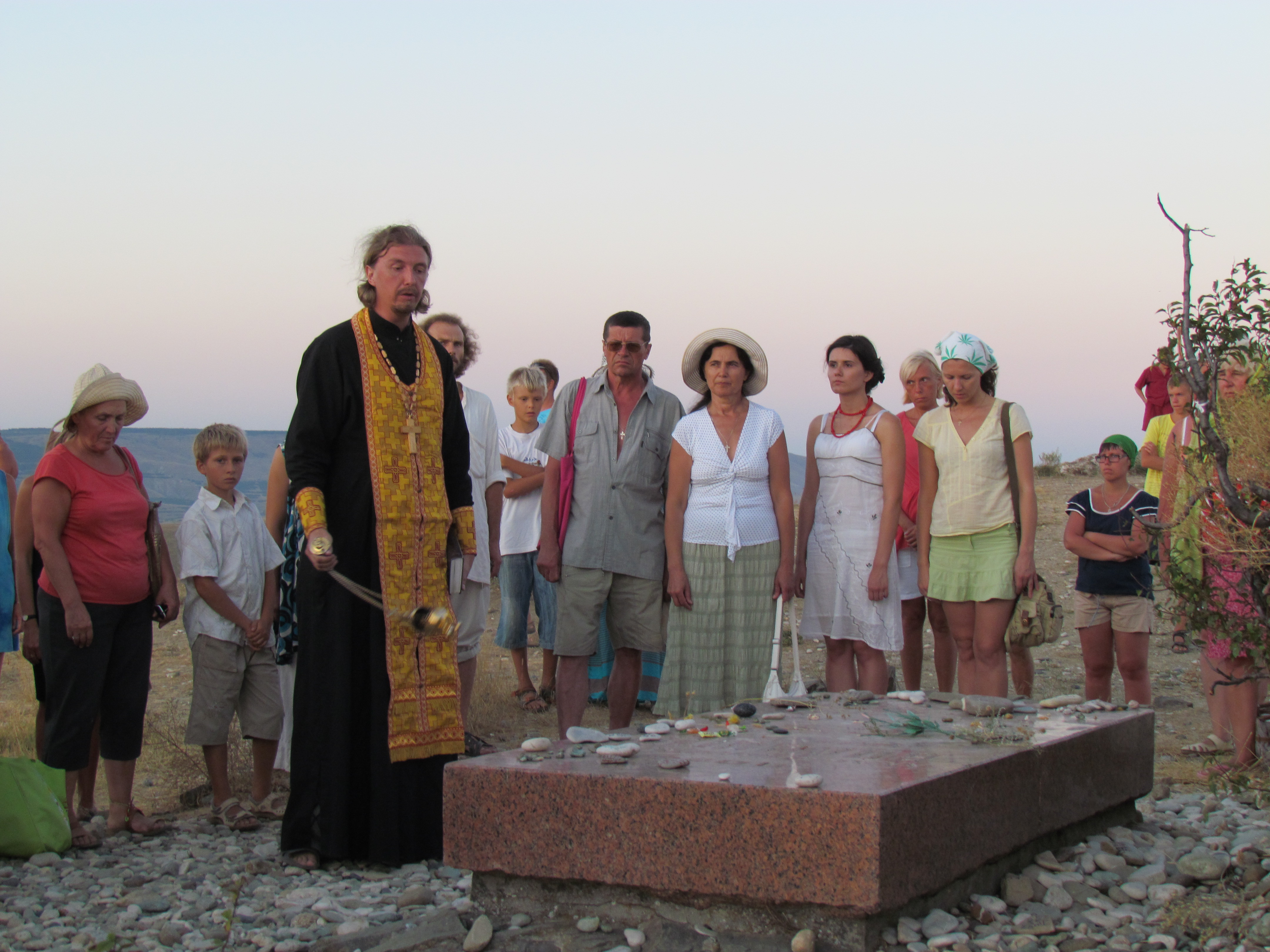
Voloshin's grave, on a hill high above Koktebel in the Crimea

Although some critics may note that Voloshin's poetry "may be esthetically inferior to that of Pasternak, say, or Akhmatova, and it is somewhat patchy," it has been noted that "it contains deep philosophical insights and tells us more about Russian history than the works of any other poet." Many of Voloshin's comments seem to be prophetic. In a normal state, he wrote, "two classes are outside the law: the criminal and the ruling class. Today, Russia has fully realized this principle." Voloshin's integrity and profound ideas made him a non-person in Soviet Union, and not a single poem of his was published in USSR from 1928 to 1961. It has been theorized that "if he had not died in 1932, he would certainly have become another victim of the Great Terror. "'This is not the first time that, dreaming of freedom, we build a new prison," read the first line of one of Voloshin's finest poems.

Voloshin's small village of Koktebel in Southern-Eastern Crimea, which inspired so much of his poetry, still retains the memory of its famous poet, who was buried there on a mountain now bearing his name. His "House of a Poet" (now a museum) continues to attract people from all areas of the world, reminiscent of the days when its owner served as the host of countless poets, artists, actors, scientists, and wanderers. He is regarded as one of the most notable poets of Russian Silver Age. His poems were set to music and frequently performed by singers-songwriters.

Russian progressive rock band Little Tragedies recorded music to three of Voloshin's poems.

== Works ==
- Faces of Creativity (1914)
- Deafmute Demons (1923)
- Verses on Terror (1923)
- The Ways Of Cain (1923)
