= The Lives of Remarkable People =

Biographical and fiction collection series

- Language: Russian
- Genre: Biography
- Publisher: Molodaya Gvardiya
- Publication date: Since 1933
- Publication place: Soviet Union

The Lives of Remarkable People (Russian: Жизнь замечательных людей or the acronym, ЖЗЛ, commonly referred to as "жэзээлка") is a book series comprising both fictional and biographical works intended for a mass audience. It was initially published from 1890 to 1924 by Florenty Pavlenkov under the title Жизнь замечательных людей. The series primarily features reprints of biographies published after the 1900s. Since its inception, there have been several attempts to revive the series, with Maxim Gorky being the most successful. Between 1933 and 1938, the series was reissued by the Association of Periodicals and Newspapers, starting with a new numbering system. After 1938, The Lives of Remarkable People was published by Molodaya Gvardiya, maintaining a continuous numbering system. As of 2001, the numbering was doubled to account for Pavlenkov's editions. By 2010, the total number of publications in the series exceeded one thousand five hundred, with total circulation surpassing one hundred million copies.

Pavlenkov's series was designed to be accessible to the public and aimed to "acquaint readers with outstanding personalities of past epochs." The genre format was guided by educational objectives, presenting popular biographical essays focused on the significant achievements of individuals who made notable contributions to world civilization. The biographies were authored by prominent publicists and journalists of the time, such as E. A. Solovyov and A. Skabichevsky. Some essays were penned by professional philosophers and writers, including V.S. Solovyov, and N.M. Minsky. Maxim Gorky introduced a new format of biographies featuring world-renowned figures in science, art, and revolution. Under the publishing house Molodaya Gvardiya, a public editorial board was established, which included academicians V. L. Komarov, E. M. Minsky. L. Komarov, E. V. Tarle, A. E. Fersman, professors Y. N. Tynyanov and P. F. Yudin, as well as writers A. A. Fadeev and A.N. Tolstoy.

In the 1950s, the editors of The Lives of Remarkable People established three main principles for selecting texts to be published, which have since been adhered to: scientific accuracy, high literary quality, and entertainment. For authors, publication in the series represented a recognition of their high social and professional status. Over the years, Molodaya Gvardiya invited notable figures such as Lev Gumilevsky, Sergei Durylin, Konstantin Paustovsky, Marietta Shaginian, Kornei Chukovsky, Juri Lotman, Alexei Losev, and Nathan Eidelman to contribute biographies. Many of these authors subsequently became subjects of new books in the series. During the 1960s and 1970s, the texts were influenced by ideological requirements, with the concept of "remarkable" often interpreted as "flawless." Consequently, most individuals selected for biographies were viewed as ideologically sound, which led to a limited exploration of the complexities of their lives.

After the dissolution of the Soviet Union, the circulation of the series declined significantly, primarily due to competition from emerging media and the Internet. The number of published books did not increase for many years, and the genre of "classical" biography became restricted to scientific frameworks. The tradition of the narrative biography diminished, and professional historians and philologists began to dominate authorship within the series. At the same time, since the 1990s, the thematic range of the series has expanded considerably, encompassing biographies of tsars, Orthodox saints, émigré writers, figures from the White movement, and Soviet and foreign film actors. Additionally, the influx of translated literature has increased markedly.

== Florentiy Pavlenkov's library of biographies and attempts of its continuation ==
Publisher F. Pavlenkov's cover design with standard headings

Between 1890 and 1900, the publishing house of Florentiy Pavlenkov produced a biographical library titled The Lives of Remarkable People. The title was inspired by the French work Vie des Hommes illustres, as well as the title of the translation of Plutarch's Parallel Lives, which Pavlenkov highly admired in his youth. After he died, his executors completed the series with a total of 200 biographies, which were reprinted until 1924. This biographical library gained considerable popularity, resulting in at least 40 reprints and a total circulation of 1.5 million copies, with individual editions printed in quantities ranging from 8,000 to 10,000 copies. The biographies in Pavlenkov's series were relatively short, resembling popular scientific sketches, and were priced at about 25 kopecks, making them accessible to gymnasium and university students. They were noted for their high-quality writing, sometimes exhibiting a degree of artistry, and for their concise content. Among the authors of these biographies were notable figures such as Vladimir Solovyov, Alexander Skabichevsky, and the poet Nikolai Minsky. Many of the works in this series are regarded as exemplary within the genre. The bibliographer Nikolai Rubakin, one of the heirs of the publishing house, praised the quality and significance of Pavlenkov's biographical library. According to Rubakin's recollections, these books had a profound influence on prominent thinkers and writers, including Nikolai Berdyaev, Vladimir Vernadsky, Ivan Bunin, and Alexei Tolstoy during their student years.

According to Pavlenkov's vision, the series aimed to "acquaint readers with outstanding figures of the past." The term "remarkable" in the title was meant in its original sense: "worthy of note, attention, extraordinary, or surprising." The first biography published in late April or early May 1890 was that of Ignatius of Loyola. Among the most popular publications were Skabichevsky's essays on Lermontov and Pushkin; the last reprint of Pushkin's biography was dated 1924. The series was based on the classical literary topos theory, which presented ideals of creative individuals, politicians, inventors, and others. Ye. Petrova noted that most biographies conformed to the normative ideals established in the 19th century, as reflected in their titles. Newer types of biographies, which included the biographer's individual perspective and nuanced assessments of the subjects, were less common. Typically, the construction of personal images was based on psychological insights and the growing interest in the mental complexities of notable individuals. Evgeny Solovyov, who wrote essays on figures such as Dmitri Pisarev, Ivan Turgenev, Alexander Herzen, Leo Tolstoy, Fyodor Dostoyevsky, Nikolai Karamzin, Hegel, Oliver Cromwell, Osip Senkovsky, the Rothschild family, and Ivan the Terrible, particularly embraced this approach. Solovyov actively popularized Nikolai Mikhailovsky's characterization of Dostoevsky as "a cruel talent", while also exploring the spiritual underpinnings of the writer's interests. The concepts of "martyrdom", prophecy, and genius in Solovyov's essays contributed to the popularization of the "Dostoevsky myth", which established a new normative rhetorical biography during the Soviet period.

In 1916, Maxim Gorky attempted to continue Pavlenkov's series through his own publishing house, Parus. He developed a new plan for the library, which included nearly 300 proposed titles. This project was also presented to Zinovii Grzhebin, but the revolutionary climate of the time prevented its realization. In 1921, independently of Gorky, the M. and S. Sabashnikov's publishing house started the series Historical Portraits. The following year, the cooperative publishing house Kolos launched a Biographical Library In 1923, the Brockhaus-Efron publishing house introduced the series Images of Mankind. In 1925, the Biographical Library was established by Gosizdat (Association of State Book and Periodical Publishers). In 1928, the series The Lives of Remarkable People was published by the Moskovsky Rabochiy publishing house. However, in none of these series did the number of published titles exceed half a dozen.

== The Gorky Series (1930s–1980s) ==
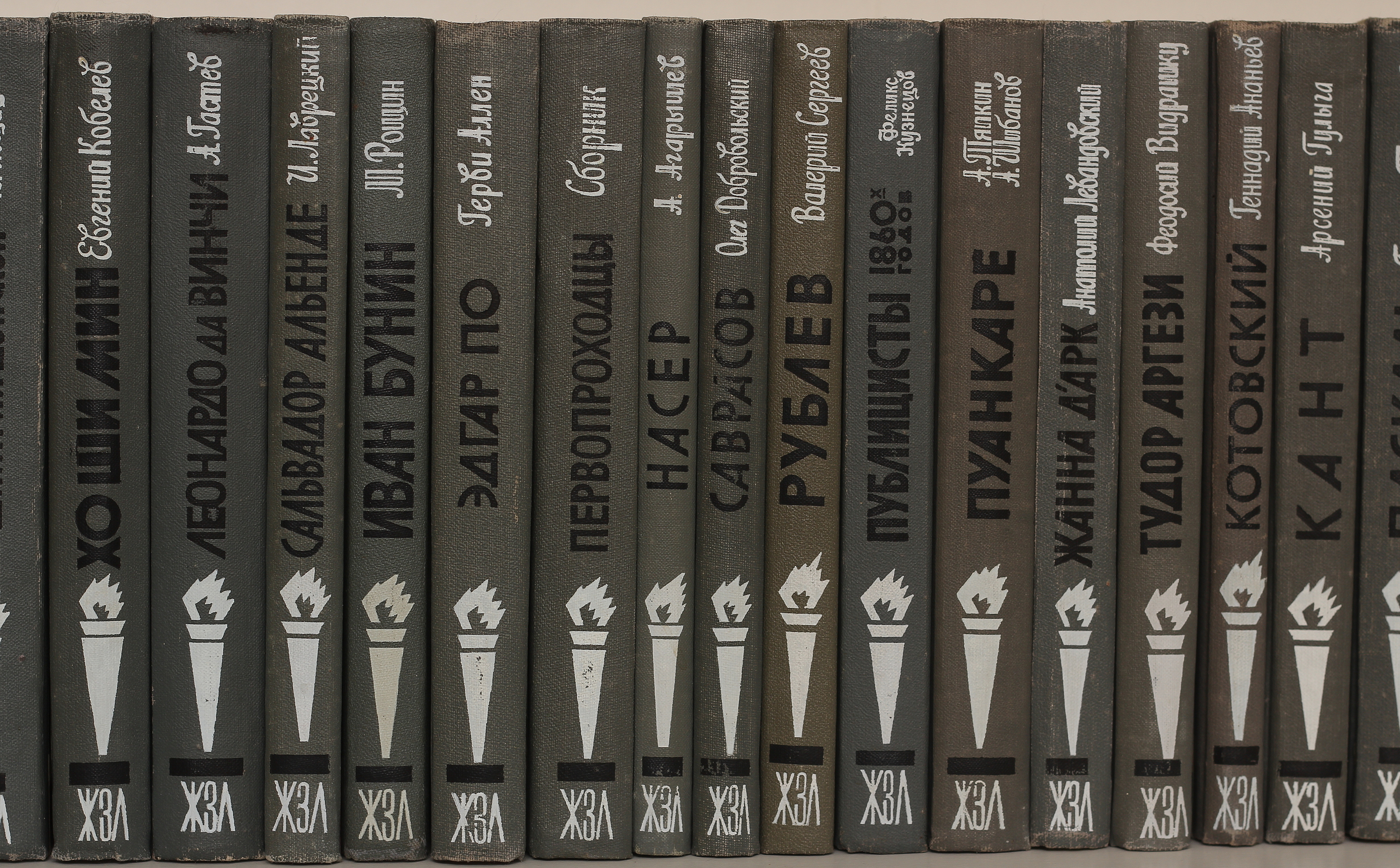
Spines of post-1962 issues in serial design. Books are dedicated to Ho Chi Minh, Leonardo da Vinci, Salvador Allende, Edgar Poe, Nasser, Savrasov, Andrei Rublev, Henri Poincaré, Joan of Arc, Tudor Arghezi, Grigory Kotovsky, Kant (and two books about groups of people)

A study by Ural literary scholars Tatiana Snigiryova and Alexei Podchinenov delineates three distinct periods in the development of The Lives of Remarkable People, each identified by the notable name of its publishing house: The Pavlenkov Series (1890–1900), The Gorky Series (1930–1980), and The Molodaya Gvardiya Series (1990–2000). Each of these periods is characterized by different primary features.

=== 1930-1940s ===
In the early 1930s, Maxim Gorky was able to realize his initial vision through the Journal-Gazette Association (Zhurgaz), which was led by Mikhail Koltsov. Correspondence from that period indicates that Gorky sought to enlist prominent writers and specialists with a flair for writing to contribute to a comprehensive series of biographies. Notable figures, such as Romain Rolland, were commissioned to write about Socrates and Beethoven, Fridtjof Nansen was tasked with a biography of Columbus, Ivan Bunin focused on Cervantes, Anatoly Lunacharsky was assigned the history off Francis Bacon, and Kliment Timiryazev was to write about Charles Darwin. However, the manuscripts submitted did not always meet Gorky's high standards, as he maintained a maximalist approach and supervised the project until his death in 1936. The first volume of the series was published in January 1933; it was a biography of Heinrich Heine by Alexander Deitch, followed by biographies of Mikhail Shchepkin, Rudolf Diesel, Dmitri Mendeleev, Heinrich Pestalozzi, Ivan Sechenov, George Sand and the Wright brothers. The last book published during Gorky's lifetime was a biography of Napoleon by Yevgeny Tarle. Gorky bequeathed the series to the Komsomol, addressing a letter to Aleksander Kosarev, the General Secretary of the Komsomol Central Committee. After Zhurgaz was dissolved in 1938, the series was taken over by Molodaya Gvardiya, ensuring that the publication of biographical works continued as a means of educating new generations. Despite the didactic nature of the series, the interpretation of "remarkable" evolved to encompass terms such as "outstanding" and even "great." Among the early titles were biographies of Napoleon, Talleyrand, the capitalist figure Henry Ford, and the conquistador Pizarro. Gorky believed that biographies of negative characters were equally important for readers as those of positive figures. In 1934, a biography of Gogol by the exiled critic Alexander Voronsky was confiscated and destroyed, remaining unpublished until 2009, in celebration of Gogol's 200th anniversary. This work was the first in the Small Series of The Lives of Remarkable People. Additionally, in 1933, Gorky rejected Mikhail Bulgakov's biography of Molière for its "non-Marxist approach" and "excessive emphasis on the personal attitude to the subject", delaying its publication in the series until 1962.

The publishing house established a public editorial board for the series, which included prominent academicians such as Vladimir Komarov, Evgeny Tarle, Alexander Fersman, professors Yuri Tynyanov and Pavel Yudin, writers Alexander Fadeev and Alexei Tolstoy. The subjects of the biographies were predominantly world-renowned figures in science, art, and revolutionary movements. By 1941, a total of 107 titles had been published in the series, with an overall circulation of approximately 5 million copies. With the outbreak of World War II, the series was temporarily suspended. In 1943, it was revived under the title Remarkable Russian People, producing a total of 14 small-format issues designed for easy portability. From 1944 to 1945, the series continued under the same name, with 28 additional volumes released. In 1945, the series resumed publication under its original title Remarkable People's Live.

The average print run for the books in the series ranged from 40,000 to 50,000 copies, with each volume typically comprising around 200 pages. From the initial editions, the cover featured a pen-and-ink portrait of the subject, created based on sketches by artists such as Peter Alyakrinsky, Grigory Bershadsky, and Nikolai Ilyin. The format of the books gradually evolved, and the titles generally followed a standard naming convention: typically using the surname or the full name of the subject, and less frequently utilizing initials and surnames for Russian and Soviet figures. Artistic titles were quite rare. The series published biographies of both Russian and foreign personalities in roughly equal measure. The subjects considered "remarkable" included writers and poets (21 biographies), scientists (18), revolutionaries and reformers (18), inventors (14), travelers (8), among others.

In the 1940s, following the resumption of the series, the publication rate decreased significantly, with the release of only 3 to 7 new books per year, compared to the pre-war output of 8 to 20. By 1949, a total of only 53 biographies had been published, along with 7 reprints; however, the average length of the texts increased to 350 pages. The distribution of subjects remained relatively consistent with pre-war trends, including 14 biographies of writers, 11 of scientists, 7 of inventors, 5 of military leaders, and 4 of travelers. Between 1950 and 1959, the series published 104 biographies, with an average print run of 56,000 copies, although the length of the books varied considerably. After 1956, both the number of publications and the size of the print runs returned to pre-war levels, with reprints increasing significantly to a total of 27. Throughout the 1950s, the most frequently published biographies focused on writers and poets (27), scientists (27), and revolutionaries and reformers (17).

=== The Khrushchev Thaw's and the Stagnation's period ===
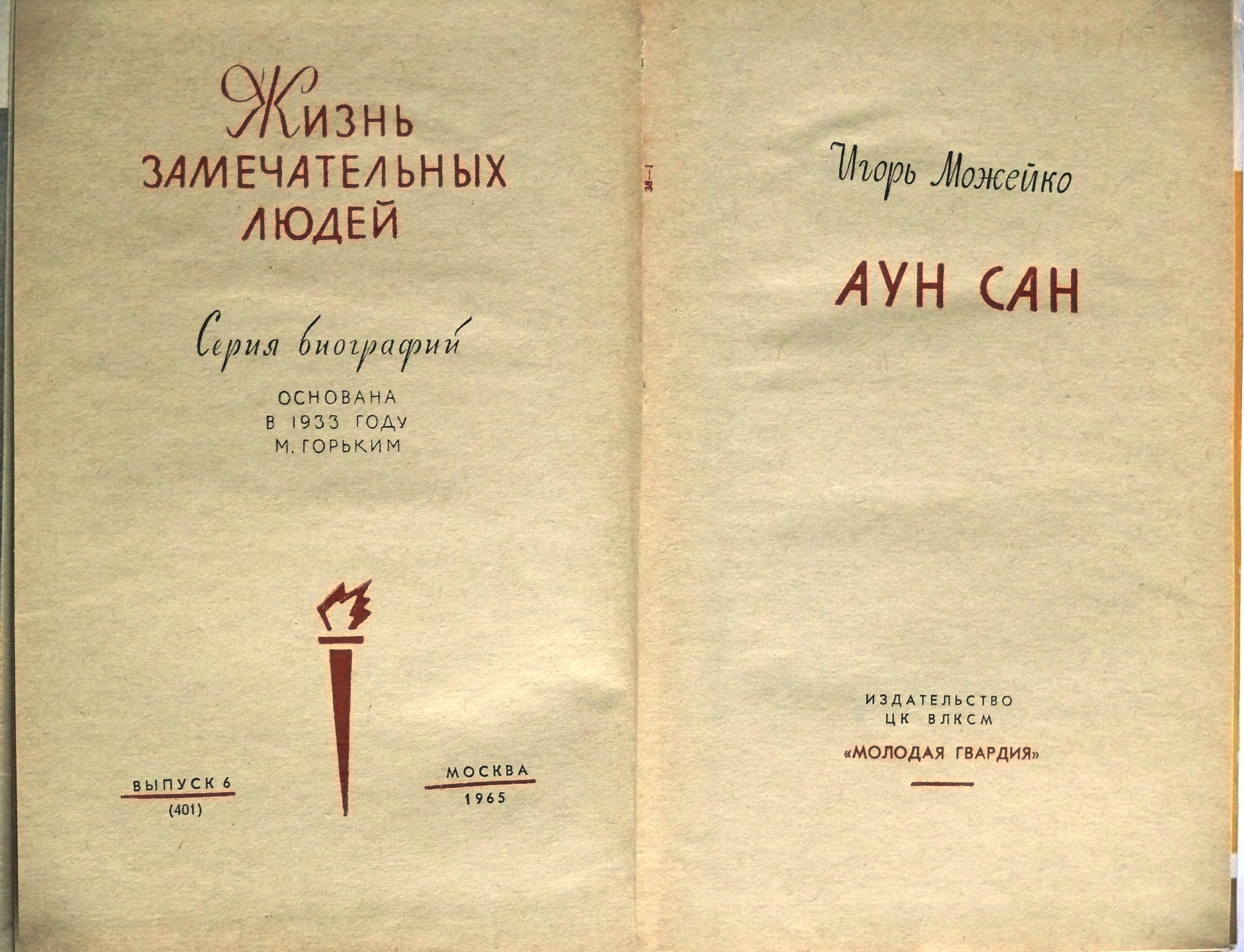
The title page of Aung San by Igor Mozheiko (1965), issue 401 of the ZhZL, representing the serial design from the 1960s and onwards

In the 1950s, the editors of the series established three fundamental principles for the selection of published texts, which have been maintained ever since: scientific accuracy, high literary quality, and entertainment value. The quality of writing about pioneers in science and technology was notably high; for instance, according to the recollections of Igor and Lev Krupenikov, a biography of Vasily Dokuchayev was used by students at the State Agrarian University of Moldova to prepare for the exam on soil science. Gradually, a distinct style and design principle for the series volumes emerged. In the early 1950s, the books were small, featuring a cover adorned with an engraved portrait in the form of a medallion, which was inscribed within an oval frame that organized the overall cover design. By the mid-1950s, there were instances where the author's name was not credited on the cover, a departure from previous practices where the author and the subject were credited alternately. In 1962, a standardized cover design was adopted following a competition, led by artist Yuri Arndt. This new design included a photograph or portrait of the subject, complemented by images related to their life and achievements. The series emblem, a golden torch symbolizing enlightenment, created by artist Boris Prorokov, was introduced on the spine of the books in 1958 and later changed to white after 1962.

During the Thaw, the series expanded to include biographies of foreign authors, featuring works such as Stefan Zweig's essays on Balzac, Irving Stone's biography of Jack London (notably, "Sailor in the Saddle", which was the first book in the series to be published in the new design), and Carl Sandberg's biography of Lincoln. A significant milestone was the posthumous publication of Mikhail Bulgakov's biography of Molière, written thirty years earlier. The number of annual issues in the series increased dramatically, rising from 5–6 to 25–30, with average circulation climbing from 50,000 to 100,000 copies. Notably, the biography of Rokossovsky by Vasily Kardashov, published in 1972, achieved a remarkable circulation of 300,000 copies. This milestone was matched in 1986 with Viktor Stepanov's biography of Yuri Gagarin. The genre of biography gained considerable popularity in the country, leading various publishing houses to produce their own series, such as Flaming Revolutionaries, Life in Art, and Thinkers of the Past. According to M. Izmailova, the Soviet reading public, entering a period of intense spiritual exploration, sought role models among figures from both distant and recent history, contrasting their tumultuous lives with their own "unheroic" realities. This context created a demand for diverse heroes, including thinkers, patriots, and luminaries of national culture. Over the years, Molodaya Gvardiya invited Anatoly Levandovsky, Lev Gumilevsky, Sergei Durylin, Konstantin Paustovsky, Marietta Shaginian, Korney Chukovsky, Yuri Lotman, Aleksei Losev, and Nathan Eidelman to contribute to the series.

After 1960, the series began regularly publishing biographies of Latin American figures, including Bolivar, Pancho Villa, Miranda, Benito Juarez, Che Guevara, and Salvador Allende. These biographies were primarily authored by Iosif Grigulevich, a Soviet intelligence officer and Latin American scholar, who wrote under the pseudonym "Lavretsky." In 2002, Grigulevich's own biography, penned by Neil Nikandrov, was published in the series. During the 1960s and 1970s, the tone of the texts was often aligned with ideological requirements, interpreting the concept of "remarkable" as synonymous with "flawless." Most of the featured figures were ideologically aligned and morally unimpeachable, with little acknowledgment of the challenges they faced in their lives. For instance, in the volume Olympians, the essay about speed skater Inga Artamonova concluded with the phrase "Her life ended too soon", omitting the fact that she was murdered by her jealous husband, a detail often excluded from official obituaries. Similarly, essays on Civil War commanders typically ended with mentions of their "tragic deaths", without detailing that these occurred during the Great Purge.

A notable example of censorship occurred in the biography of Nikolai Vavilov, authored by Semyon Reznik and published in 1968. This work notably omitted any reference to Vavilov's arrest and subsequent death in prison, and its publication was delayed to remove passages critical of Lysenkoism. Mark Popovsky referred to this as "canonization with the cutting off of the biography". In the collection Young Heroes of World War II, published in 1970, six of the forty profiles lacked patronymics and lifespans, with four individuals even unnamed. The authorship of the essays on these young soldiers remained unspecified. The editorial staff faced criticism from party structures, particularly during conflicts involving publicist Mikhail Lobanov and Alexander Yakovlev, which led to controversies surrounding a book about A. N. Ostrovsky. Additionally, thematic plans for the series sometimes met with opposition from the press department of the Central Committee of the Communist Party of the Soviet Union. Biographies of figures such as Andrei Rublev and Yanka Kupala faced scrutiny, with the latter accused of "bourgeois nationalism". A particularly complicated situation arose at the end of the 1970s regarding the biography of N. V. Gogol, which I. P. Zolotussky worked on for a decade. The manuscript was initially rejected by publishers, prompting Zolotussky to consider emigration. Ultimately, the situation was resolved with the intervention of G. M. Markov, the First Secretary of the Board of the Union of Writers. Following this intervention, Zolotussky's biography was published at least six times in the series after its 1979 release.

== The post-Soviet period ==
With the dissolution of the Soviet Union in 1991, the series encountered significant economic and socio-cultural shifts within Russian society. Figures from the Soviet past were suddenly reinterpreted as either criminals or victims, while the spotlight shifted to previously unknown or marginalized individuals, including dissidents, pre-revolutionary tsars and dignitaries, and emerging stars of mass culture. The closure of many major Soviet publishing houses—though Molodaya Gvardiya managed to survive—resulted in a dramatic decline in print runs, which plummeted to 5,000 or 10,000 copies per title. This decline was accompanied by a decrease in the prestige of reading and rising book prices. The years 1992 and 1994 were particularly challenging, with only two and one book published, respectively. During this period, the genre of biography aimed at the mass public became dominated by media outlets focused on sensational details, and the emergence of the Internet provided strong competition. Consequently, the "classical" biography genre became increasingly confined to academic contexts, leading to the decline of the tradition of romanticized hagiography. The authorship of the series began to shift toward professional historians and philologists, resulting in publications that were often highly specialized and less accessible to a general audience. Despite the reduction in the frequency of publications to just a few books per year, the 1990s also saw a significant expansion in the thematic diversity of the series. Biographies of tsars, Orthodox saints, émigré writers, and figures from the White Movement began to appear, alongside a notable increase in translated literature that catered to the interests of the mass audience. Throughout these challenges, the management of the series remained committed to maintaining high standards and preventing its closure.

The year 2005 marked a significant new chapter for The Lives of Remarkable People series with the publication of Dmitry Bykov's biography of Boris Pasternak. This work, which blends popular narrative with a wealth of factual detail, has been reprinted over a dozen times and reignited public interest in the Molodaya Gvardiya publishing house and the biographical genre more broadly. The editorial team began to re-engage contemporary writers, reflecting a renewed commitment to evolving the series. According to M. I. Izmailova, the development of the series occurs amidst a convergence of various trends in Russian biographical narratives, both established and emerging. In 2008, RIA Novosti noted the series' uniqueness, highlighting that it lacks both temporal and geographical constraints, allowing for biographies of figures from any field and profession.

In 2001, the series celebrated the publication of its thousandth issue, a biography of Vladimir Vernadsky by Gennady Aksyonov. This milestone was commemorated with two exhibitions in the State Duma of the Russian Federation and in the Presidential Library at the Kremlin. Following this, the numbering of the series was increased by 200 to account for the earlier works published by Pavlenkov, and the frontispiece was updated to read: "A series of biographies. Founded in 1890 by F. Pavlenkov and continued in 1933 by M. Gorky". The total circulation of the series exceeded 100,000,000 copies. The 1500th issue was a biography of Yuri Gagarin, authored by Lev Danilkin, published to coincide with the 50th anniversary of Gagarin's historic space flight.

== Reviews and opinions ==
=== Literary features of The Lives of Remarkable People series biographies ===
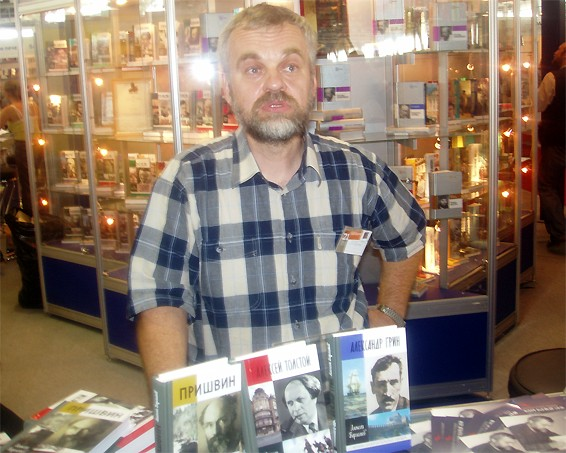
Alexei Varlamov at the book fair with his books from the The Lives of Remarkable People series

==== The evolution of the series ====
Florentiy Pavlenkov published his series after defining the circle of characters and establishing an ideological orientation that evolved "from radicalism to enlightenment." The genre format of the series was shaped by the goals of enlightenment, presenting popular biographical sketches that highlighted the significant achievements of individuals who made a lasting impact on world civilization. Maxim Gorky drew on Pavlenkov's experience, establishing a format with a distinctly cultural and ideological character. The history of "remarkable people" was not merely reconstructed but rewritten within the framework of Soviet ideological objectives. The Cultural Revolution in the Soviet Union anchored in the slogan "The country should know its heroes".

Alexei Varlamov referred to the genre of biographies from the Gorky period as "memorial books." These biographies were commissioned from well-known and respected scholars and writers capable of deeply exploring the life and works of the subjects, including their spiritual biographies. Varlamov cites Yuri Seleznyov's book on Dostoevsky (first published in 1981) as an example. The main narrative focuses on "the writer's journey through life, his 'self-defense,' and confrontation with external circumstances." The structure of the book is strictly ternary: "The Fate of Man", "The Life of a Great Sinner", and "The Life and Death of a Prophet", with chapters titled "Golgotha", "Porposch", and "Temptation" (Part One), along with subchapters such as "Wharf", "Abysses", and "Beauty Will Save the World" (the third chapter of Part Two). Overall, the revelation of new facts and the enrichment of historiography periodically prompted the editors to commission new biographies of the same figures. An example of this is Fyodor Dostoevsky, for whom Lev Grossman's biography was published as early as 1962. Biographies of other writers, such as Esenin and Mayakovsky, were also subject to creative interpretation.

At the present stage of the publishing series, which has evolved since the 1990s, there is no unified strategy. This period can be partly characterized as "commercial", as reflected in the quality of some publications and in private publishing practices. The focus is on attracting a mass readership and achieving commercial success, influenced by modern popular culture's technological advancements. The narrative often weaves intriguing stories about interesting, though not necessarily remarkable, individuals, incorporating elements of exposure, gossip, and mystery. Despite this commercial emphasis, the series continues to fulfill its enlightening, cultural, and social (myth-making) functions. The ambiguity of the format allows for greater creative and research experimentation. This is evident in both literary studies—such as Svetlana Kovalenko's work on Anna Akhmatova, a book on Daniil Kharms by Alexander Kobrinsky, a book on Osip Mandelstam by Oleg Lekmanov, a book on Samuil Marshak by Matvei Geyser, a book on Valery Bryusov by Nikolai Ashukin and Ruslan Shcherbakov), and the "literary novel" (Alexei Varlamov's books on Alexei Tolstoy, Mikhail Prishvin, Alexander Grin, Mikhail Bulgakov; Pavel Basinsky on Gorky; Dmitry Bykov on Boris Pasternak, Bulat Okudzhava). Traditionally, each book in the series concludes with a section titled "Main Dates of Life and Work." However, the chronology often unfolds at the level of the narrative's fabula, with the narrative strategy relying on plot intrigue, typically introduced through a prologue featuring an author's twist. For example, the book about Federico Fellini is presented as a collection of interviews with the director conducted over forty years by journalist Costanzo Costantini, with the editor's preface emphasizing a departure from conventional presentation styles.

Writer Alexander Shelukhin has conducted a statistical analysis of the number of books in the series, including reprints. He proposed a five-part tentative chronology:

- 1890–1924 (including a five-year hiatus during the Civil War): 242 books, averaging 7 per year;
- 1933–1953 (counting a two-year hiatus during World War II): 183 books, 9 per year;
- 1954–1991: 645 books, 17 per year;
- 1992–1999: 50 books, 6 per year;
- 2000–2021: 1,188 books or 54 issues per year.

==== Sub-series of The Lives of Remarkable People ====
In 2005, Valentin Yurkin, the editor-in-chief of the series and the general director of Molodaya Gvardiya, initiated a new cycle titled Lives of Remarkable People: Biography Continues. The first issue focused on Boris Gromov, the governor of the Moscow region, and was presented as a revival of a tradition established by Florentiy Pavlenkov, who had published biographies of prominent figures such as Leo Tolstoy, Otto Bismarck and William Gladstone in the original series. In the Gorky series, living "remarkable people" were primarily featured only in collections. Critics associated the publication of Gromov's biography with the impending 2008 presidential election, labeling it "fictitious capital". The series continued with books on Mintimer Shaimiev and Nursultan Nazarbayev, which heavily relied on interviews and memoirs from the subjects themselves, as well as their associates, friends, and relatives.

In 2009, the Small Series of The Lives of Remarkable People was launched. According to Pavel Basinsky, this initiative was a response to contemporary challenges, particularly in anticipation of the economic crisis that impacted the publishing industry. The aim was to create compactly designed books suitable for reading during commutes. This format posed challenges for authors, as the volume was limited to 8 or 10 printed pages. It was initially intended that biographies of the same individuals would not be duplicated between the small and main series. However, the main series included a biography of Nikolai Gogol by A. K. Voronsky in 2020, and in August 2022, a biography of Alexander Pushkin, prepared by V. I. Novikov, was published in both formats. Initially, both biographies were part of the Small Series of The Lives of Remarkable People.

Subsequently, the series expanded to include The Lives of Remarkable People: Modern Classics, and The Lives of Remarkable People: Great People of Russia.

==== The style of the books series ====
For many years, The Lives of Remarkable People series has generated significant interest in both reading and academic circles. Galina Ulyanova, Doctor of Historical Sciences, noted: "The series was a very bright phenomenon in the public life of the 1960s and 1970s. Huge print runs of up to 100 thousand copies, supplements with illustrations. For any author, writing a book for this series was a recognition of his or her high professional level". Many volumes from this series continue to receive positive evaluations from professional critics.

The Russian historian Sergei Firsov describes the style of the books in the series as follows:

[...] the books of this series have several directions. Some of them can be called literary-fictional, others historical-publicistic, and even scientific-historical. One thing is unchangeable: a book published in the The Lives of Remarkable People series must be written in such a way that a reader interested in history can read it with no less interest than a professional researcher familiar with historical questions. Of course, much depends on the ability of the author: some are able to speak simply and clearly about the complex, while others do not have it.

Research of Angelina Terpugova from the Institute of Linguistics of the Russian Academy of Sciences analyzed the texts of the series by examining chapter titles. This analysis revealed that the structure of the biographies is not only anchored in factual milestones (such as birth, education, work, and death) but also reflects enduring notions of what constitutes a "remarkable person." The table of contents consistently includes elements that highlight the uniqueness of the subject (such as vocation, fateful encounters, miracles, struggles, and trials). These elements recur across all books in the series. According to Terpugova, this pattern arises from stereotypical perceptions of "remarkable people", which are shared by both authors and readers.

=== Critics ===
==== Literary criticism ====
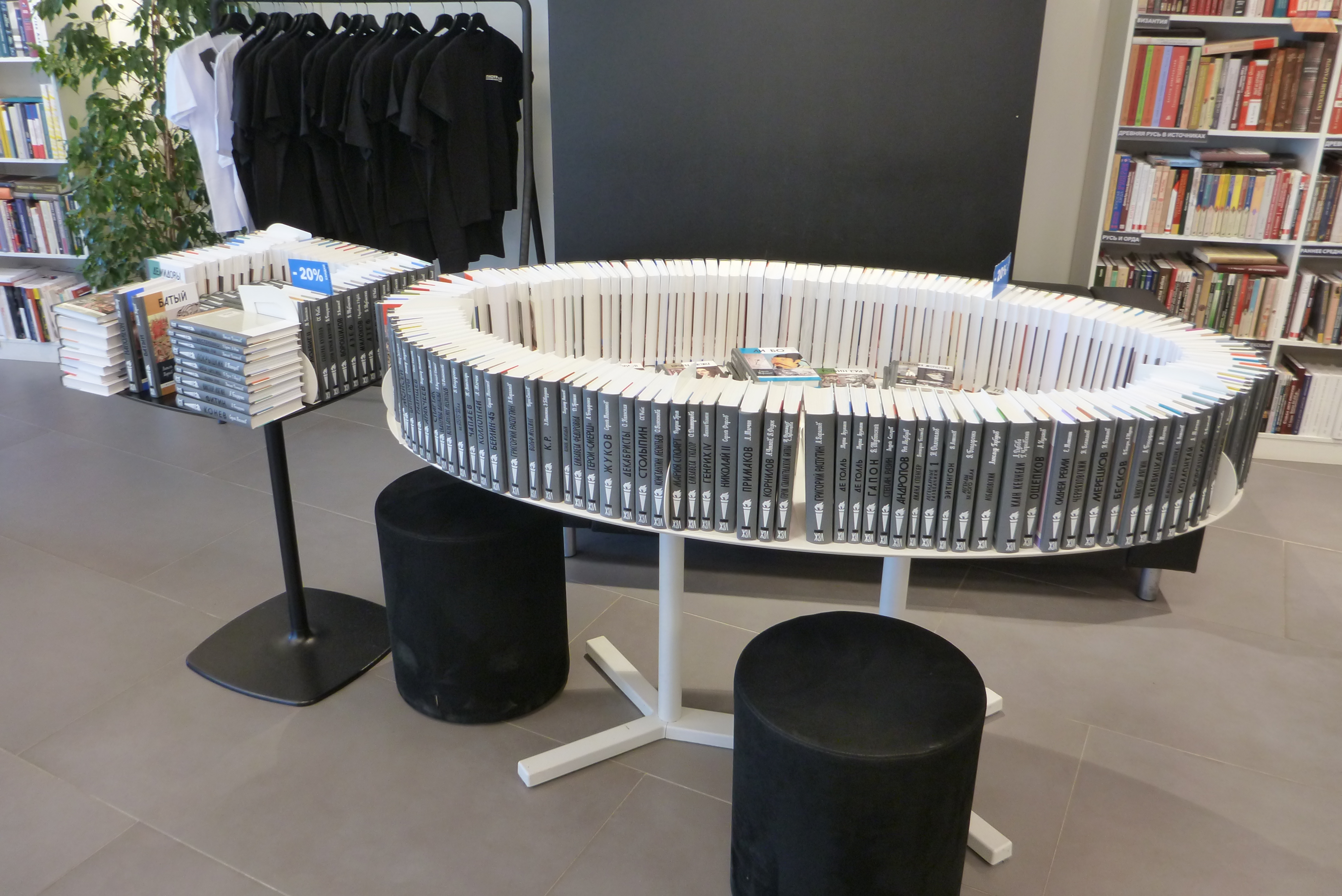
The The Lives of Remarkable People series at the Piotrowski Bookstore. Boris Yeltsin Presidential Center, May 26, 2019

Despite their popularity among the public and specialists, the books in The Lives of Remarkable People series have faced repeated criticism for their perceived lack of objectivity and partisanship. Oleg Osovsky conducted a study on this matter and noted that, as of 2018, interest in the series had somewhat declined, as indicated by the modest circulation of many titles. Nevertheless, some publications sparked significant debate among literary critics. This decline in interest is attributed in part to the general reading public's preference for small, everyday details and personal weaknesses over the achievements of scientists. For instance, Boris Egorov's biography of Juri Lotman was praised as "an achievement of the subgenre of scientific biography", yet it was never included in the series. This discrepancy reflects a natural tension between the authors of literary biographies and those producing literary studies, which can often be summarized by the formula "literary vs. documentary". Mikhail Bakhtin famously rejected the biographical method in his analyses of Rabelais and Dostoevsky, observing that "our biography is some mixture of creativity and life. Dostoevsky, like any writer, is one person in his work and another in his life. The relationship between these two identities (the creator and the individual in life) remains unclear". Authors of the series have approached this divide in various ways. For example, the biographies of Dmitry Likhachev (by Valery Popov), Viktor Shklovsky (by Vladimir Berezin), and Mikhail Bakhtin (by Alexei Korovashko) were penned by a professional writer and two literary critics, respectively. According to Osovsky, in the biography of Likhachev, the author attempts to assess his contribution to Russian culture using a set of literary clichés (such as drawing parallels with A. Solzhenitsyn).Meanwhile, literary scholars Berezin and Korovashko endeavored to enrich their historical-literary texts with elements of refined diction.

The authors analyzed in this study actively engaged with the memoir prose of their subjects, including Dmitry Likhachev, Viktor Shklovsky, and Mikhail Bakhtin. Valery Popov, who utilized Likhachev's memoirs to recount his life, did not attempt to delve into the inner world of his subject, as the genre of biography relieved him of the need for artistic narrative. In contrast, Viktor Shklovsky's memoirs from the 1960s closely interacted with and critiqued his own earlier prose from the 1920s, prompting the researcher to employ a range of literary devices that reflect both the style and thought processes of Shklovsky. Osovsky notes that V. S. Berezin's book may appear overly complex and stylistically intricate to the average reader of the series; however, it generally adheres to the conventional boundaries of the genre.

On the contrary, in A. V. Korovashko's book his character Mikhail Bakhtin appears as an "antihero". Initially, The Lives of Remarkable People series exhibited a strong tendency towards "panegyric" biography, where authors not only recognized the "remarkable" qualities of their subjects but also viewed them as models to emulate. In Bakhtin's case, the biographer faced the challenge of addressing the "Bakhtin myth", which included a significant degree of skepticism towards Bakhtin's own memoirs and those of his close associates. Osovsky critiques Korovashko for making serious errors in handling the texts and for not adequately understanding Bakhtin's scientific perspectives. He suggests that the popular biography genre does not necessitate extensive citations from the literature. Osovsky concludes that biography is a relatively conservative genre, where established narrative structures and techniques are typically effective. Attempts to modify the established approach often result in a loss of literary quality, leading to the substitution of factual accuracy with fiction and conjecture.

==== The failures of the popular series ====
Critical feedback has also been directed at various books within the The Lives of Remarkable People series. Irina Andreeva, the granddaughter of the writer Leonid Andreev, expressed strong disapproval of the biography of her grandfather. Similarly, D. Efremova, the granddaughter of Ivan Yefremov, described his biography as an "order to dehumanize", prompting significant criticism following her remarks. Prior to this, writer and literary critic Valery Teryokhin had published a negative review of the same biography. The biographies of figures such as Alexander III and Buddha faced harsh criticism, while those of Homer, Velimir Khlebnikov and Patriarch Sergius were not particularly well-received. Biographies of Andrei Platonov, Yuri Andropov, Samuel Marshak, Kornei Chukovsky and Viktor Tsoi were ambivalently received. Vladimir Shukhov's great-granddaughter labeled her ancestor's biography as "a disgusting book—illiterate, unscrupulous, and talentless", which prompted an official rebuttal from the Molodaya Gvardiya publishing house.

One particularly notable work is the biography of Jesus Christ, written by Metropolitan Hilarion (Alfeyev). The author presented it as a popular version of his extensive six-volume monograph, "Jesus Christ: Life and Teachings." The rationale for its inclusion in the series was articulated as follows: "He was God, which did not prevent him from being a man: an interesting and intelligent one". Reactions from ecclesiastical and secular critics diverged significantly. Sergius (Akimov), the rector of the Minsk Theological Academy, praised the book as "an excellent manual on homiletics and the history of the Gospel for theological schools". Georgy Orekhanov, Vice Rector of the Saint Tikhon's Orthodox University, called the book "useful in terms of disseminating adequate views of Christianity" to a wide audience. Historian Dmitry Volodikhin noted that the book effectively conveyed to non-religious readers the essence of who Jesus was. However, it was also critiqued as evidence of the "profanation of the sacred and the secularization of Christianity", with some arguing that it represented a forced adaptation of the Church to contemporary society for ostensibly "missionary" purposes".

According to science fiction critic Roman Arbitman, the publishing house planned to publish a biography of the Strugatsky brothers, written by science fiction writer Ant Skalandis, in the series. However, a conflict with the editors arose over a detailed account of the lengthy process—taking eight years—behind the publication of "Roadside Picnic" by Molodaya Gvardiya in the 1970s. Consequently, Skalandis' extensive volume was published by AST, which received severe criticism, particularly regarding its tendency for "self-expression at the expense of the characters". A new contract for a biography of half the volume was subsequently signed with Gennady Prashkevich and Dmitry Volodikhin. Arbitman accused the authors—a professional novelist and a historian—of employing a consistent conspiracy theory and attempting to "marginalize their heroes." He also pointed out the poor quality of editorial work, citing factual inaccuracies such as the confusion between the 20th and 22nd Congresses of the CPSU.

In 2010, 2010, a complex situation arose concerning the publication of a biography of Dovlatov, written by Valery Popov. The book was notable for lacking the traditional photograph of the protagonist on its cover, which was instead replaced by the inscription: "Here should have been a portrait of S. Dovlatov." This change was necessitated by the heirs' prohibition on reproducing any photographs of the writer or most of his correspondence. Alexander Shelukhin criticized the selection of figures in the series, especially given the sheer volume of biographies published after 2000—averaging 54 books per year. By the end of 2021, the series had published 2,173 biographies, with only 161 dedicated to women, highlighting a gender disparity (termed "patriarchal" by the critic). Among Russian (Soviet) figures, 1,381 were men compared to 116 women. The series featured personalities from 72 countries, with France following Russia as the most represented, featuring 122 individuals, followed by Great Britain and the United States with 79 each, and Germany with 60. Notably, Japan is absent from the series altogether. AShelukhin humorously noted the lack of a biography for Nobel Prize winner Pyotr Kapitsa, despite the presence of a book about his son. He also identified other "gaps" in the roster of personalities. From the critic's perspective, some included figures appeared to be "drawn by the ears", such as Ivan Antonovich and Anna Leopoldovna, who had not made significant historical contributions.

The literary critic Sergei S. Belyakov explicitly stated it:

The publishing house Molodaya Gvardiya is exploiting a gold mine of the The Lives of Remarkable People series. The books are published in such large numbers and in such an astonishing range (from Johann Wolfgang Goethe to Eduard Streltsov) that the publishing house apparently does not even spend precious time on the most modest editing. And they do!

== Awards ==
- In 2003, Pierre Ciprio's biography Balzac Unmasked received the "Abzats" anti-award. The reason was a failure to meet the standards accepted in Russian literary studies: the translator, Evgenia Sergeeva, did not always accurately reproduce the traditional translations of the titles of Balzac's novels.
- The books of the series won three times in a row in the competition of the National Literary Big Book Award (2006: Boris Pasternak by Dmitry Bykov, 2007: Alexei Tolstoy by Alexei Varlamov, 2008: Solzhenitsyn by Lyudmila Saraskina).
- The National Prize "Best Books and Publishers of 2010" was awarded to Valentin Osipov's book Sholokhov.
- The Patriarchal Prize was awarded to the books Metropolitan Filaret and Alexis II by Alexander Segeny.
- А. M. Turkov was awarded the Governmental Award of the Russian Federation (2012) for his biography of A. Tvardovsky.

== Bibliography ==
- Великие имена: «Жизнь замечательных людей» (85 лет серии популярных биографий): библиографический указатель лит.*https://yakovlbibl.ru/pr/ZZL12.pdf / отв. за вып. В. П. Карнаухова; сост. Т. А. Сергеева; оформ. обл. Т. С. Лаздовская. — Строитель, 2018. — 180 p.
- Вишнякова Ю. И. Воспитание на образце: 80 лет биографической серии «Жизнь замечательных людей» издательства «Молодая Гвардия»*https://cyberleninka.ru/article/n/vospitanie-na-obraztse-80-let-biograficheskoy-serii-zhizn-zamechatelnyh-lyudey-izdatelstva-molodaya-gvardiya // Вестник ПСТГУ. Серия IV: Педагогика. Психология. — 2019. — issue 53. — P. 120—132.
- Вишнякова Ю. И. «ЖЗЛ»: издательская политика в первые десятилетия существования серии (1933—1959)*https://www.elibrary.ru/item.asp?id=38492444 // Румянцевские чтения — 2019. Материалы международной научно-практической конференции: в 3 частях. — 2019. — P. 129—134.
- Измайлова М. И. Историческая биография: опыт и закономерности (на примере серии «ЖЗЛ»)*https://cyberleninka.ru/article/n/istoricheskaya-biografiya-opyt-i-zakonomernosti-na-primere-serii-zhzl // Царскосельские чтения. — 2014. — V. 1, № XVIII. — P. 64—68.
- Каталог 1933—1973. 40 лет ЖЗЛ / Редакторы-составители А. И. Ефимов, С. Е. Резник. — М.: Молодая гвардия, 1974. — 288 p.
- Каталог «ЖЗЛ». 1890—2002 / Сост. Л. П. Александрова, Е. И. Горелик, Р. А. Евсеева. — 4-е изд., испр. и доп. — М.: Молодая гвардия, 2002. — 328 p. — ISBN 5-235-02538-5.
- Каталог «ЖЗЛ». 1890—2010 / Составитель Е. И. Горелик. 5-е изд., испр. и доп. — М.: Молодая гвардия, 2010. — 432 p. — ISBN 978-5-235-03337-5.
- Осовский О. Е. «Литературность» против документальности как авторская стратегия в современной биографии (на материале последних изданий серии «ЖЗЛ») // Филология и культура. — 2018. — № 3 (3). — P. 194—198.
- Петрова Ю. В. Образ «Великого писателя» в неклассической биографической парадигме: биографии Достоевского конца XIX в.*https://cyberleninka.ru/article/n/obraz-velikogo-pisatelya-v-neklassicheskoy-biograficheskoy-paradigme-biografii-dostoevskogo-kontsa-xix-v // Вестник Омского университета. — 2012. — № 1. — P. 268—270.
- Подчиненов А. В., Снигирёва Т. А. Литературная биография: документ и способы его включения в текст*https://cyberleninka.ru/article/n/literaturnaya-biografiya-dokument-i-sposoby-ego-vklyucheniya-v-tekst/viewer // Филология и культура. — 2012. — № 4 (30). — P. 152—155.
- Подчиненов А. В. Серия «Жизнь замечательных людей» в историческом и социокультурном аспектах // Научное и культурное взаимодействие на пространстве СНГ в контексте развития книгоиздания, книгообмена и науки о книге: материалы Международной научной конференции, Москва, 24—25 ноября 2014 г.: К 300-летию Библиотеки академии наук: part 1. — М.: Наука; Кн. культура, 2014.
- Снигирева Т. А., Подчиненов А. В. Литературная биография: традиция и современные интерпретационные стратегии*https://www.elibrary.ru/item.asp?id=15502929 // Интерпретация текста: лингвистический, литературоведческий и методический аспекты. — 2010. — № 1. — P. 97—101.
- Терпугова А. В. Оглавление книг серии «Жизнь замечательных людей» как особый предмет рассмотрения*https://cyberleninka.ru/article/n/oglavlenie-knig-serii-zhizn-zamechatelnyh-lyudey-kak-osobyy-predmet-rassmotreniya // Вестник Новосибирского государственного университета. Серия: Лингвистика и межкультурная коммуникация. — 2011. — V. 9, iss. 2. — P. 66—74. — ISSN 1818-7935.
- Шелухин А. В Японии нет замечательных людей!? О некоторых нелепостях, казусах и курьёзах серии книг «ЖЗЛ»*https://litrossia.ru/item/v-yaponii-net-zamechatelnyh-ljudej/ // Литературная Россия. — 2022. — № 1.
- Эрлихман В. В. ЖЗЛ: замечательные люди не умирают*https://cyberleninka.ru/article/n/zhzl-zamechatelnye-lyudi-ne-umirayut // Россия и современный мир. — 2012. — № 2. — P. 213—223.
