= Eidelman =

Eidelman may refer to:

- Cliff Eidelman (born December 5, 1964, in Los Angeles, California ) - American composer
- Natan Eidelman (Eidel'man, Natan Iakovlevich, 1930, in Moscow – 1989, in Moscow) - Russian author and historian.
- Tamara Eidelman (Eidel'man, Tamara Natanovna) - Russian historian, translator and school teacher, daughter of Natan Eidelman
- Mariano Idelman (Eidelman) Israeli actor and comedian
