= Pavel Uvarov (historian) =

Russian historian

- Born: 4 January 1956; Moscow
- Education: Doctor of Historical Sciences
- Alma mater: Moscow State Pedagogical University
- Employer: Moscow State Pedagogical University; Russian State University for the Humanities

Pavel Yuryevich Uvarov (Russian: Павел Юрьевич Уваров; born 4 January 1956 in Moscow) is a Russian medievalist. He is known primarily for his studies of French and Italian archival records (such as notarial documents) that shed light on the economic and legal history of Romance Europe from the 15th to 17th centuries. In 2006, he was elected a corresponding member of the Russian Academy of Sciences.

His father Yuri Uvarov was a specialist in French literature and a translator from French. Pavel Uvarov graduated from the Moscow State Pedagogical University in 1978 and taught at the Moscow State Pedagogical University.

In 1983, Uvarov defended his candidate dissertation, The University of Paris and the Social Life of the Medieval City, and in 2003, his doctoral dissertation, French Society in the 16th Century: A Reconstruction Based on Notarial Records.

During the 2000s, Uvarov taught at universities in Paris and other French cities. In 2017, he was awarded the Paul Leroy-Beaulieu Prize for his study Under the Arches of the Palace of Justice: Seven Legal Conflicts in 16th-Century France.

Doctor of Sciences in Historical Sciences (2003), professor (2006), Head of Department of Western Middle Ages and Early Modern Times, Institute of World History, Russian Academy of Sciences. Professor of the Higher School of Economics (Moscow).

Since 2010, he has been working at the Higher School of Economics, where he is currently a Head of the Department of social history.
