= Dzyadko =

Dzyadko (Ukrainian: Дзядко) is a Ukrainian surname.

== People ==
- Tikhon Dzyadko (born 1987), a Russian journalist, TV presenter, editor-in-chief of the TV Rain channel
- Timofei Dzyadko (born 1985), a Russian journalist, RBC editor
- Filipp Dzyadko (born 1982), a Russian journalist, editor-in-chief of the educational project Arzamas
