= Aleshkovsky =

Aleshkovsky (masculine, Russian: Алешко́вский) or Aleshkovskaya (feminine, Russian: Алешко́вская) is a Russian surname. Notable people with the surname include:

- Peter Aleshkovsky (born 1957), Russian writer, historian, broadcaster, television presenter, journalist and archaeologist
- Yuz Aleshkovsky (1929–2022), Russian writer, poet, playwright and singer
