= Dmitry Vodennikov =

Russian poet and essayist

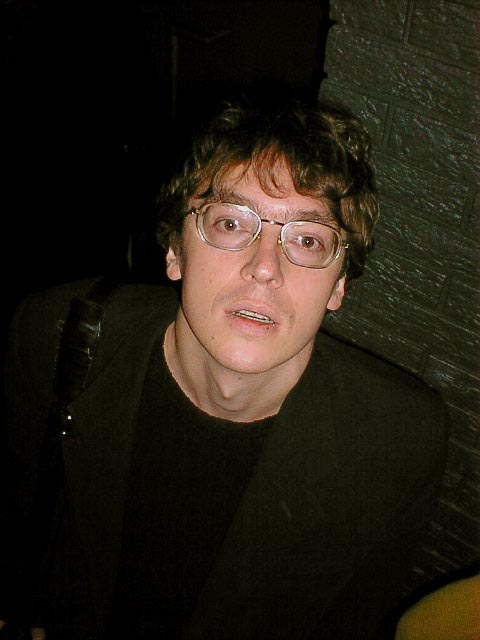
- Born: December 22, 1968 Moscow, USSR
- Occupation: Poet

Dmitry Vodennikov (Russian: Дми́трий Бори́сович Воде́нников) (born 22 December 1968) is a Russian poet and essayist.

In 2002, he was named as one of the ten best living Russian poets in a poll of 110 leading Russian poets and critics, being one of just two poets under 35 in the top ten. Some critics claim that he recites his poems better than he writes them. Herzen State Pedagogical University hold a workshop, "Dmitry Vodennikov as the new Blok, Mayakovsky and Pugacheva". He is considered another utopian project another utopian in modern Russian poetry.

Vodennikov graduated from Moscow State Pedagogical Institute, philology department and for four years worked as a school teacher. He writes essays and columns for several Russian magazines and hosts two radio shows dedicated to poetry: "Free Entry" on Radio Kultura and "Poetic Minimum" on Radio Rossii.

== Books ==
- Burr (Репейник / Repeynik) — М.: Елена Пахомова; АРГО-РИСК, 1996.
- Holiday: Book of verses (Holiday: Книга стихов / Holiday: Kniga stikhov) — СПб.: ИНА-Пресс, 1999.
- How should one live in order to be loved (Как надо жить — чтоб быть любимым / Kak nado zhit' - chtob byt' lyubimym) — М.: ОГИ, 2001.
- And men can imitate orgasm as well - (Мужчины тоже могут имитировать оргазм / Muzhciny tozhe mogut imitirovat' orgasm) — М.: ОГИ, 2002.
- A tasty meal for apathetic cats - (Вкусный обед для равнодушных кошек / Vkusnyi obed dlya ravnodushnykh koshek) — М.: ОГИ, 2005.
- Rough Copy (Черновик / Tchernovik) - СПб.: "Пушкинский фонд", 2006.
- Hello, I've come to bid you farewell - (Здравствуйте, я пришёл с вами попрощаться / Zdravstvyite, ya prishel s vami poproschatsya) - an autobiographical novel. - М.: LIVEBOOK, 2007.
