= Alexander Tubelsky =

- Born: 2 October 1940; Moscow, USSR
- Died: 31 May 2007 (aged 66); Moscow, Russia
- Occupation: teacher, innovator

Alexander Tubelsky (Александр Наумович Тубельский), 2 October 1940, Moscow – 31 May 2007, Moscow was the president of Russian teacher's "Association of democratic schools", and a professor of Moscow State Pedagogical University (MSPU)

== Biography ==
Aleksander Tubelsky was born in a Jewish family on 2 October 1940 in Moscow, USSR (now Russia ). Parents Naum Solomonovich Tubelsky (father) and Sima-Leya Aronovna Sad settled in Moscow in the late 1920s or early 1930s from Kherson, now in Ukraine. Aleksander graduated from Moscow High School and worked at the factory "Stroydetal" in Krasnodar in the late 1950s. Aleksander Tubelsky served in the Soviet Army from 1959 to 1962. Worked as a senior youth school organizer in several Moscow schools (1962–1967). In 1971, graduated from the Moscow Pedagogical institute as a history teacher. From 1972 to 1974 served as an organizer for the extracurricular activities and as a history teacher for Moscow school 733. In 1974 became a deputy director of the Youth center for extracurricular activities in Moscow. In 1982 was promoted as a director of employment, laboratory training and career guidance of Academy of Pedagogical science of USSR. In 1985 return to teaching as director and history teacher of Moscow School 734. In 1987 started progressive innovations in pedagogy and teaching which were utilized in his school. New extracurricular subjects as World Culture and Art were introduced for all students at school. Unique traditions as Pushkin Nights got their beginning at school 734 during that time. They are conducted every beginning of the school year ( September) since the mid-1980s. Self-determination group for students were set up at school to determine future career goals of the students.

By the initiative of Aleksander Tubelsky in 1992, the Ministry of Education of Russia and the Moscow Department of Education established “School of self-determination” on the base of the school No. 734 and kindergarten No. 869. This school was first among the schools in Russia on track to finding democratic changes in education.

Aleksander Tubelsky was a professor of the Moscow State Pedagogical University, the author and editor of 16 books and more than 150 articles on educational content, fabric of school life.

In February 2007 he had a micro-stroke, which did not stop his innovations in teaching science; however, on May 31, 2007, a second stroke was fatal, and Aleksander Naumovich Tubelsky died later that day.
