= Valentin Osipov =

Soviet-Russian writer, journalist and publisher (1932–2020)

- Валентин Осипов
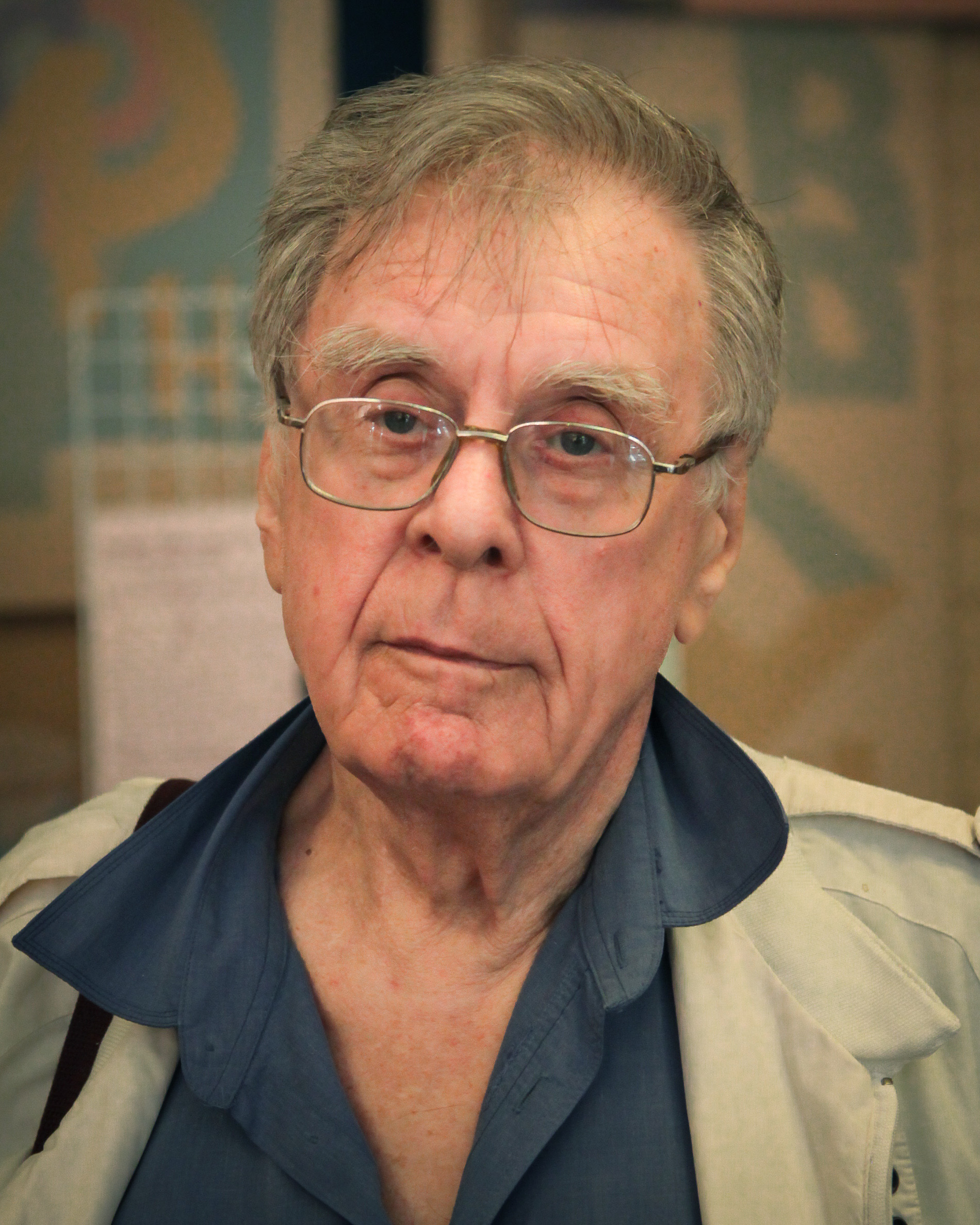
- Born: 10 July 1932; Moscow, Soviet Union
- Died: 21 December 2020 (aged 88); Moscow, Russia
- Education: Kazakhstan State University
- Occupations: Writer, journalist
- Awards: Order of the Red Banner of Labour; Order of the Badge of Honour

Valentin Osipovich Osipov (Russian: Валентин Осипович Осипов; July 10, 1932, Moscow – December 11, 2020, Moscow) was a Soviet and Russian writer, journalist, and publisher.

== Biography ==
Born on July 10, 1932, in Moscow, to Soviet diplomat and intelligence officer O. Ya. Osipov and physician L. L. Garkina. He was Russian.

In 1938, his father was repressed and buried at the Kommunarka shooting ground. His mother, as Family members of a traitor to the Motherland, was sentenced by a Special Council to eight years of forced labour in a labour camp and exile to the Kazakh SSR.

He graduated from a rural school in a Kazakh village and the history department of Kazakhstan State University. After graduating, he taught history at the forestry technical school in Leninogorsk, East Kazakhstan Region (1955–1957).

He then worked for the republican newspaper "Leninskaya Smena" (Alma-Ata, 1957–1958) and was transferred to Moscow as an instructor in the printing sector of the Central Committee of the Komsomol (Moscow, 1959–1961). With the creation of the Virgin Lands Territory, he moved to Tselinograd, where he created an editorial board from scratch and organized the publication of the regional newspaper, Molodoy Tselinnik (Tselinograd, 1961–1962). In a short time, Molodoy Tselinnik became one of the most famous Komsomol-youth publications in the USSR.

A year and a half later, he became editor-in-chief of Molodaya Gvardiya publishing house (1962–1974). He then worked as first deputy editor-in-chief of Znamya magazine (1974–1977), director of Khudozhestvennaya Literatura publishing house (1977–1986), chairman of the All-Union Center for the Propaganda of Fiction under the Union of Soviet Writers (1986–1989), and director of Raritet publishing house (1989–2005).

The National Prize "Best Books and Publishers of 2010" was awarded to Valentin Osipov's book Sholokhov.

In 2012, on the occasion of his 80th birthday, he received a congratulatory letter from the Chief of Staff of the Presidential Executive Office of the Russian Federation.

The archive (correspondence, manuscripts, etc.) collected over many years of publishing and writing activities formed a separate collection at the Russian State Archive of Literature and Art.

He died on December 11, 2020, after a long illness.

=== Publishing ===
During his tenure as director of the publishing houses Molodaya Gvardiya, Khudozhestvennaia Literatura, and Raritet, he published over 14,000 titles with a circulation of nearly 3 billion copies. He contributed to the publication of the series "Lives of Remarkable People", the "Library of World Literature" (300 volumes), and the two-volume edition of "Europe on the Threshold of the Third Millennium" in collaboration with the Federal Republic of Germany. He initiated the creation of the four-edition department "Rovesnik" (books for teenagers), an editorial complex for publishing books by young writers, and editorial offices for the literature of Spain, Portugal, and South America. The following book series have been launched: "On Your Road, Romantic", "The First Book of a Poet and Prose Writer", "Library of Classics", "Eureka", "Sport and Personality", "Library of Contemporary Science Fiction”, “Classics and the Present”, “Library of Selected Lyrics” (without circulation limits), "Library of Spiritual Revival" and the almanacs "Poetry", "Feat" and "African", among others. Large-scale editions of the collected works of Lev Tolstoy and Mikhail Sholokhov (with a circulation of 1 million copies each), the collected works of A. Pushkin with a circulation of 10,700,000 copies have been carried out, and the novel "They Fought for Their Country" by M. Sholokhov and "Tyorkin in the Afterlife" by A. Tvardovsky have been released in full (without cuts).
