= Oleg Lekmanov =

Russian literary scholar, biographer, and professor

- Олег Андершанович Лекманов
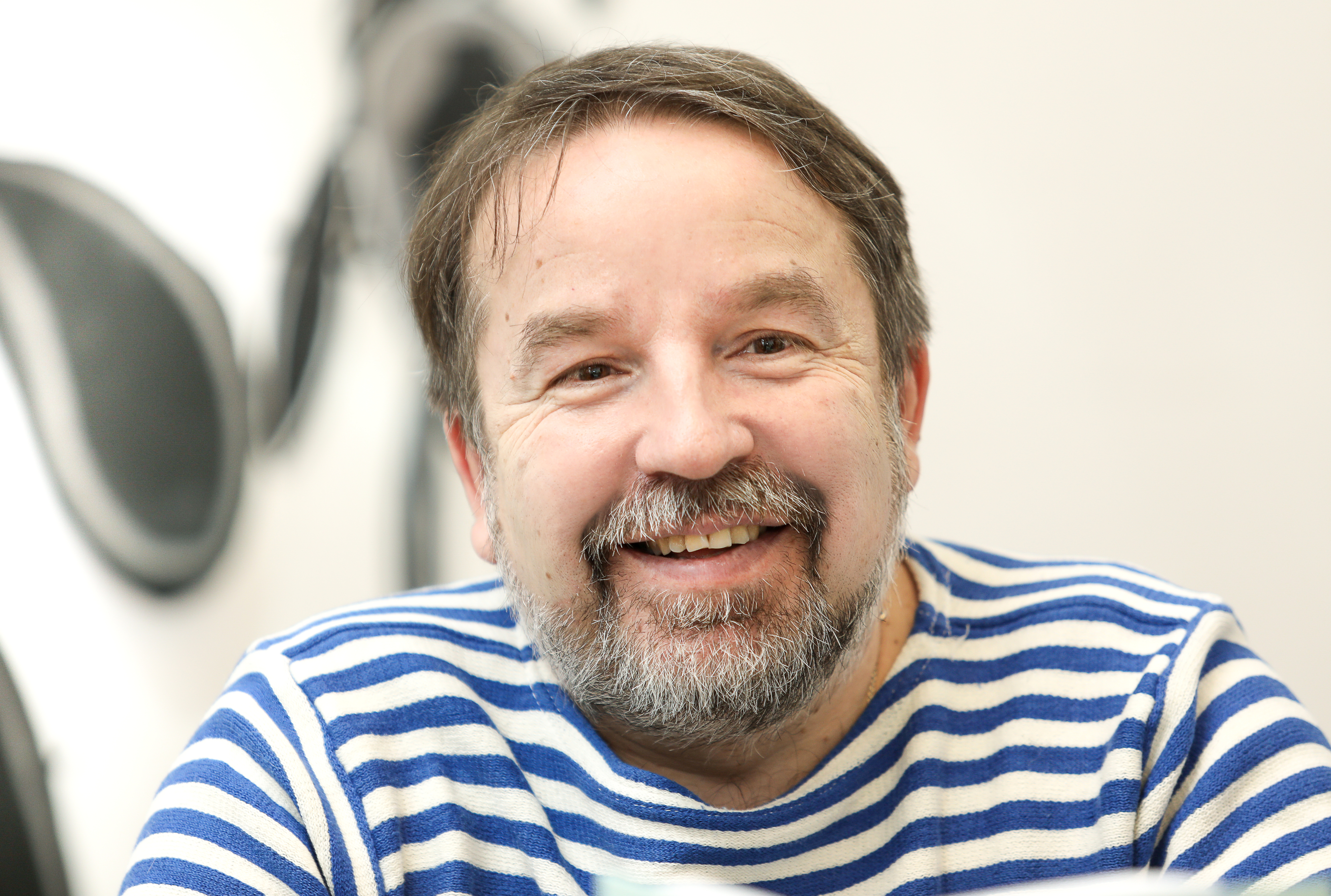
- Born: January 11, 1967 (age 59); Novomikhaylovsky, Krasnodar Krai, Russia
- Education: Moscow Pedagogical State University
- Known for: Research on Russian poetry and 20th-century literature
- Scientific career
- Fields: Literary studies
- Workplaces: Higher School of Economics, Moscow State University, Princeton University

Oleg Andershanovich Lekmanov (born January 11, 1967) is a Russian literary scholar, biographer, and professor specializing in Russian poetry and 20th-century literature. His work includes critical studies of Acmeist poetry, Russian avant-garde literature, and biographies of notable Russian authors.

== Early life and education ==
Oleg Lekmanov was born in Novomikhaylovsky, Krasnodar Krai, Russia. He pursued higher education at Moscow State Pedagogical University, where he later defended his doctoral thesis on Acmeism as a literary school.

== Academic career ==
Lekmanov has held various academic positions, including a decade of teaching at Moscow State University's Faculty of Journalism. Since 2011, he has been a professor at the Higher School of Economics, focusing on philology and literary history. He has also been a visiting professor at Princeton University.

== Publications ==
Lekmanov has authored numerous books and articles, including:

- Acmeism in Criticism: 1913–1917 (2014) – a study of Acmeist poetry and its reception.
- Keys to the Silver Age (2017) – a guide to Russian literature of the early 20th century.
- Venedikt Yerofeyev: An Outsider (2018) – a biography of the notable Soviet writer.

== Public engagement ==
In addition to his scholarly work, Lekmanov is known for engaging the public through lectures, podcasts, and essays on Russian literature. He has collaborated with educational platform Arzamas.

== Views and personal life ==
In October 2024, Lekmanov was controversially designated as a "foreign agent" by the Russian Ministry of Justice, a move criticized by academic and human rights communities. He left Russia in 2022, citing opposition to the political climate and the invasion of Ukraine.

== Selected works ==
- The Love Lyrics of Osip Mandelstam (2024)
- Russian Poetry in 1913 (2014)
- Football in Russian and Soviet Poetry (2016, co-authored)
