= Hoàng Thúy Toàn =

Vietnamese writer and literary translator

Hoàng Thúy Toàn (born 1938), often credited as Thuý Toàn, is a Vietnamese writer and literary translator. He was awarded the Order of Friendship by Russian president Dmitry Medvedev in 2010 in recognition of his Vietnamese translations of the poetry of Alexander Pushkin.

== Personal life ==
Toàn was born in Phù Lưu Village, Từ Sơn Town, Bắc Ninh Province, and went abroad for higher education, first to China in 1951 and then to the Soviet Union in 1954. He graduated from the V.I. Lenin Moscow State Pedagogical Institute in 1961.

== Career ==
After his graduation, Toàn returned to Vietnam. He went on to become chairman of the Vietnam Writers' Association's Council on Literary Translation (Hội đồng Dịch thuật Văn học), as well as director of the Center for East-West Cultures and Languages (Trung tâm Văn hóa Ngôn ngữ Đông Tây). Aside from Pushkin, other authors whose works he has translated into Vietnamese include Mikhail Lermontov, Vítězslav Nezval, Sergei Yesenin, and Rasul Gamzatov.

== Works ==
=== Non-fiction ===
- 1997: Những tié̂p xúc đà̂u tiên của người Nga với Việt Nam (with Dương Trung Quốc and D. V. Deopik): about Russia–Vietnam relations
- 2002: Những người dịch văn học Việt Nam (with Tử Huyến Đoàn)

=== Translations ===
- 1987: Kịch chọn lọc (with Thái Bá Tân): selection of Pushkin's plays
- 2004: Kié̂n và chim bò̂ câu : truyện ngụ ngôn: translation of various short stories by Leo Tolstoy
