= Florenty Pavlenkov =

Russian publisher and librarian

Florenty Fyodorovich Pavlenkov
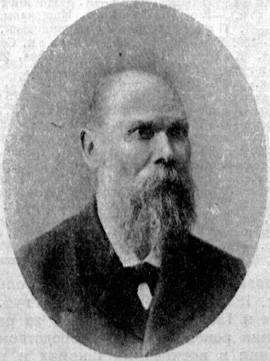
- Born: Флорентий Фёдорович Павленков; October 20, 1839; Tambov Governorate, Russian Empire
- Died: January 20, 1900 (aged 60); Nice, France
- Occupations: Publisher, librarian philanthropist

Florenty Fyodorovich Pavlenkov (Russian: Флорентий Фёдорович Павленков; 20 October 1839 – 20 January 1900) was a Russian publisher, librarian and philanthropist, founder of the All-Russian circuit of rural libraries, who compiled and edited the Illustrated Reader for Children which in 1873 received an honorable commendation at the Vienna Book exhibition. Pavlenkov is best known as a founder and publisher of an epic 200-plus biographical series "The Lives of Remarkable People" (Жизнь замечательных людей) which never ceased after his death and continues in the 21st century. The Pavlenkov Publishing House (which functioned up until 1917) released more than 750 books which sold 3,5 million.

== See also ==
- The Lives of Remarkable People
