= Peter Aleshkovsky =

Russian writer, historian, broadcaster, television presenter and journalist

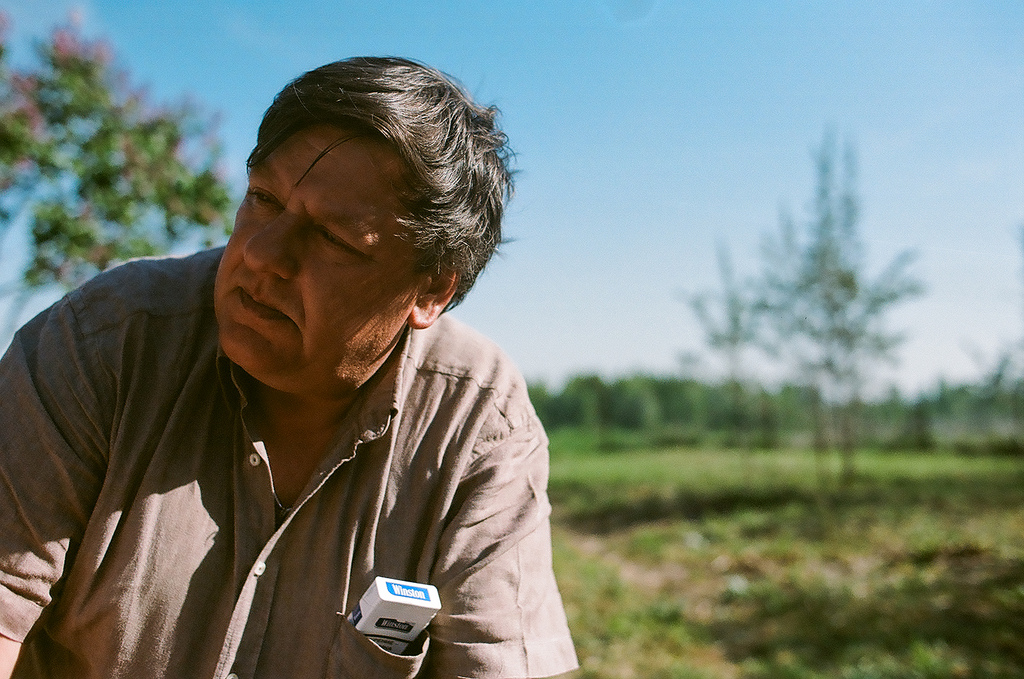
- Aleshkovsky in 2011
- Born: Pyotr Markovich Aleshkovsky; September 22, 1957 (age 68); Moscow
- Education: Moscow State University
- Occupations: writer, historian, broadcaster, television presenter, journalist and archaeologist
- Spouse: Tamara Eidelman (sep. 2000)
- Children: Dmitry Aleshkovsky
- Father: Mark Khaimovich Aleshkovsky

Pyotr Markovich Aleshkovsky (Russian: Пётр Ма́ркович Алешко́вский; born 22 September 1957) is a Russian writer, historian, broadcaster, television presenter, journalist and archaeologist.

== Biography ==
Peter Aleshkovsky was born on 22 September 1957 to historian Mark Khaimovich Aleshkovsky and Natalia Germanovna Nedoshivina in Moscow. Russian bard and writer Yuz Aleshkovsky is his uncle. Aleskhovsky was the husband of Tamara Eidelman, a son-in-law to Natan Eidelman, and he is the father of photojournalist Dmitry Aleshkovsky. Since 2000, Tamara Eidelman and Aleshkovsky have been separated. He graduated with a degree in history from the Moscow State University in 1979.

Working with "Союзреставрация" (Soyuzrestaurations) from 1979 to 1985, he restored several monasteries in northern Russian regions, among them Novgorod, Kirillo-Belozersky, Ferapontov and Solovetsky. He began writing stories since 1989 in the journal Wolga, then switching to numerous other magazines, among them The Youth, October and The Capital. From 2000 to 2002 he worked at the literary magazine Book's Revue, and hosted the TV show with the same name on Rossiya. From 2007 to 2008 he maintained a weekly column in the journal The Russian Reporter. In 2008 he also wrote essays there. He hosted the television show Alphabet of Reading on Culture. Themes and style of his literary works are individual, ranging from Gothic and realistic stories, fairy tales and historical narrations, often with a touch of humour. "His works are richly descriptive and evocative of the uniquely Russian worldview, while at the same time tapping into universal human emotions and experiences".

== Awards ==
Aleshkovsky won the Russian Booker Prize in 2016 for his novel The Citadel. His book Skunk: A Life (Жизнеописание Хорька) was nominated for the 1994 Booker, Vladimir Chigrintsev two years later for the same accolade, and A Fish (Рыба) was nominated for the 2006 Booker and the 2006 Big Book.
