= Viktor Idzio =

Ukrainian historian

Viktor Sviatoslavovych Idzio (Ukrainian: Віктор Святославович Ідзьо) is a Ukrainian historian and director of the Institute for Eastern Europe. Idzio was born in Ivano-Frankivsk on November 26, 1960.

== Notability ==
In the past 15 years, he has published over 500 articles and 21 monographs dealing with controversial areas of Ukrainian history. Being based in Moscow during the fall of the Soviet Union allowed him to access materials in the archives of the KGB, GPU and other organisations that were formally closed or had restricted access.

Idzio's publications shine light on previously unknown or undocumented aspects of the activities of the Ukrainian Insurgent Army, the Organization of Ukrainian Nationalists.

Idzio is thought to be one of the experts in Ukrainian history of the 9th-13th century, early Slavic culture, and Celtic culture on Ukrainian territory, that the concept of the three brotherly Slavic tribes are a myth perpetrated by Soviet historians, that the Galician-Volynian State was also a myth of Soviet scholars which was much vaster than originally thought. Idzio searched the archives of Moscow for the huge amount of materials taken out of Ukraine dealing with aspects of Ukrainian history.

Other topics where he has produced monographs include such topics as "The Ukrainian diaspora in Russia", Ivan Franko, Mykhailo Hrushevsky, Lesia Ukrainka, Hryhory Skovoroda, and the development of religious thought in Ukraine.

Idzio has a Ukrainian nationalistic view of Ukrainian history. He states that he has concluded that the Russian people are originally a Finno-Ugric tribe.

== Biography ==
Idzio graduated in 1984 from the faculty of History of the Carpathian National University, a student of Volodymyr Hrabovetsky (School of M. Hrushevsky)

- 1984-85 Lieutenant in the Soviet Army.
- 1986-97 Inspector in the Ivano-Frankivsk oblast department of Education.
- 1987-1997 - teacher of History in Ivano-Frankivsk.
- 1988-1992 - teacher of History in Moscow.
- 1992-2002 - post graduate student in History at the Moscow State pedagogic University.
- 1997–defended his doctoral dissertation: "The role of the Celts in the formation of political, religious and cultural organizations of the Slavs on the territory of Ukraine".
- 1997-2002 - Prorector of academic-organization at the Moscow State Pedagogical University.
- 1998 - professor of the Moscow state pedagogical University.
- 1992 - one of the founding members of the Ukrainian University in Moscow.
- 1995 - founder and first president of the Ukrainian Historical Club in Moscow.
- 1995 - main editor of the Ukrainian Historic Almanac in Russia
- 1996-1997 - main editor of The Ukrainian Historic Newspaper in Russia
- 1997 - joint founder of the Ukrainian Institute at the Moscow pedagogic University.
- 1997-2007 - member of the Council of Ukrainians in Russia.
- 1992-2000 - Dean and professor at the Ukrainian University of Moscow.
- 2002 - member of the Presidium of the International Academy of Sciences of Eurasia.

== List of Monographs ==
- 1.Віктор Ідзьо. Українська держава в ХІІІ столітті. Івано-Франківськ. 1999, 320 с.
- 2.Віктор Ідзьо. Ранньослов’янське суспільство, ранньослов’янська державність і зародження та становлення християнства на території України. Агенція Релігійної Інформації. Львів 2001, 320с.
- 3.Віктор Ідзьо. Українська діаспора в Росії. Історія, наука, релігія. Львів. БАК. 2002, 304с.
- 4.Віктор Ідзьо. Кельтська цивілізація на території України. Львів. Сполом. 2002, 343с.
- 5.Віктор Ідзьо. До історії однієї могили на Закерзонні. Перемишль - Львів. Сполом . 2003, 320с.
- 6.Віктор Ідзьо. Історія України. ПП “Бодлак”, Львів. 2003, 735с.
- 7.Віктор Ідзьо. Українcька держава в ІХ-ХІІІ століттях. Львів. Сполом. 2004, 416 с.
- 8.Віктор Ідзьо. Раннньослов’янське суспільство і ранньослов’янська державність. Зародження і становлення християнства на території України. Видання ІІ доповне і перероблене. Львів. Сполом . 2004, 288с.
- 9.Віктор Ідзьо. Українська Повстанська Армія – згідно аналізу свідчень німецьких та радянських архівних джерел. Львів. Сполом. 2005, 208с.
- 10.Віктор Ідзьо. Галицька держава – процеси етнотворення і становлення (III - XII ст). Львів. Камула 2005, 351с.
- 11.Віктор Ідзьо. Засновник Львова король Данило та Українська держава в ХІІІ ст. Львів. Видавництво університету “Львівський Ставропігіон”, 2006, 418с.
- 12.Віктор Ідзьо. Іван Франко. На шпальтах часописів українців Росії та Польщі у ХХ ст. Львів. Сполом 2006, 55с.

13.Віктор Ідзьо. Михайло Грушевський на шпальтах часописів українців Росії “Украинский Вестник” та “Украинская Жизнь” у першій чверті ХХ століття. Львів. Сполом 2007, 62с.

- 14.Віктор Ідзьо. Релігійна культура Європи і зародження, становлення та розвиток християнства в Україні”. Львів. Ліга-Прес-2007, 346 с.
- 15.Віктор Ідзьо. Український Історичний Клуб м.Москви - 12 років активної праці (1995–2007). М.2007, 450с.
- 16.Віктор Ідзьо. Митрополит Андрій Шептицький на шпальтах російської преси та часопису українців Росії “Украинская Жизнь” в 1914-1917 роках ХХ століття. Львів. Сполом 2007, 56с.
- 17.Віктор Ідзьо. Кельтська цивілізація на території України. Львів. Камула - 2007, 343с.
- 18.В.Ідзьо. Леся Українка на шпальтах часопису московських українців “Украиская Жизнь”. М.2007, 52с.
- 19. Віктор Ідзьо. Basternae - Бастарнія згідно свідчень античних, римських джерел та карти Клавдія Птоломея (ІІІ ст. до н. е. - ІІІ ст. н. е.). Львів. Сполом 2007, 172с.
- 20.Віктор Ідзьо. Karpiani – Карпи-Хорвати згідно свідчень римських та візантійських джерел ( ІІ ст. - ХІ ст. н.е.). Львів. Сполом 2007, 178с.
- 21.Віктор Ідзьо. Григорій Сковорода – національний символ української філософської та державницької думки XVIII століття. (285 - ій річниці з дня народження присвячується). Львів. Сполом 2007,78с.
