= Tamara Eidelman =

Honored Teacher of the Russian Federation and historian

- Тамара Натановна Эйдельман
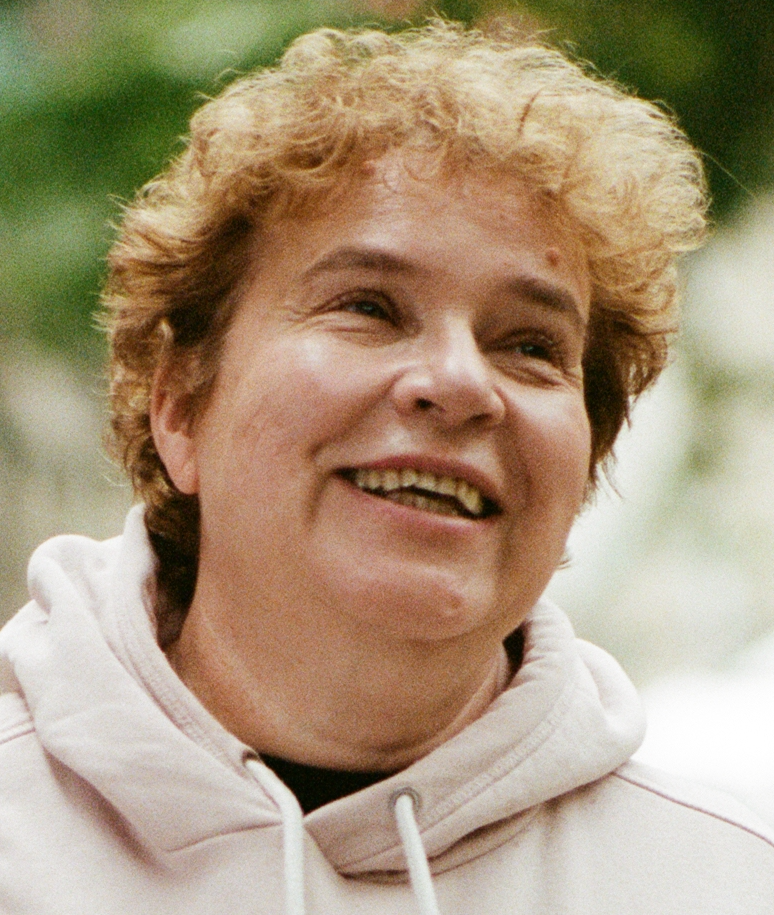
- Eidelman in 2021
- Born: Tamara Natanovna Eidelman; December 15, 1959 (age 66); Moscow, RSFSR, Soviet Union
- Education: Moscow State University (Faculty of History, 1981)
- Occupations: History teacher; radio host; writer; blogger; translator; editor
- Spouse: Peter Aleshkovsky (sep. 2000)
- Children: Dmitry Aleshkovsky
- Relatives: Natan Eidelman (father); Yakov Eidelman (grandfather)
- Writing career
- Language: Russian
- Period: 1986—present
- Genre: Non-fiction
- Subject: History
- Notable awards: Honored Teacher of Russia

Tamara Natanovna Eidelman (Russian: Тамара Натановна Эйдельман; born 15 December 1959) is a Russian historian, Honored Teacher of the Russian Federation, translator, blogger and an editor for Russian Life.

== Early life ==
Tamara Natanovna Eidelman was born a daughter of historian and writer Natan Eidelman on December 15, 1959 in Moscow.

== Career ==
Eidelman has been working as a middle- and high-school teacher since 1981. In 1984, she worked in Moscow School #45; from 1986 to 2021, she worked in Moscow School #67 as a teacher of history and social studies, and later as head of the school's Department of History.

She is author and editor of Mozaika kultur (Rus. Мозаика культур "Mosaics of Cultures") study guide.

Eidelman has authored multiple articles on teaching issues published in Russian Journal, Euroclio Bulletin, School Review; presented TEDx talks. She hosted thematic programs “Books of Our Childhood”, “The Subjunctive Mood” and “The Fates of Books” on the radio stations Mayak, Voice of Russia and Radio Russia-Culture.

She is also the author and lecturer of a series of lectures on history and social science at the Direct speech (conference organizer) School and the lecturer of a series of children's audio courses on history for Radio Arzamas. Lecturer of a series of lectures on the history of Russia at the beginning of the 19th century on the InternetUrok.ru platform.

She was blogging on the Echo of Moscow website between 2012 and 2022 and since 2020, she was a columnist for the online edition of The Insider.

From 2003 to 2021, she was History Editor at Russian Life magazine, penning over 300 articles that were translate into English. She was also a founding editor of Chtenia literary journal, published by Russian Life.

In October 2019, she created the “History Lessons with Tamara Eidelman” channel on YouTube, where she discusses various historical topics. As of August 2023, the video blog had approximately 1.3 million subscribers, and the total video views have reached 185 million. She has a YouTube channel on world history in Russian.

In April 2021, she presented the author's cycle "Against the Current: A History of Civil Conflicts" at the Yeltsin Center. The cycle was dedicated to the peaceful struggle of people for their rights, including the bloodless change of totalitarian power in a number of European countries in the 20th century.

She helped with the translation of the Russian edition of The Wolf of Wall Street by Jordan Belfort and is the author of the book How Propaganda Works (Russian: Как работает Пропаганда).

== Political views and activism ==
In 2014, she criticised Russian politicians for their military intervention in Ukraine. On April 9 she said that she would like to teach patriotism in her classes but only if she can do it her way, referring to mass deportation of Crimean Tatars in World War II which according to her is still not a part of curriculum. On March 2, 2014, she and her daughter took part in an anti-war picket in front of the Ministry of Defence in Moscow. They were detained and brought to Meshchanskoe police station with more than 15 other protesters, where they were held for longer than the legally permitted three hours. Later, she told journalists that she and her daughter escaped through the window.

On August 31, 2014, she criticized Russian President Vladimir Putin for disregarding the rule of law.

In April 2021, Eidelman wrote an open letter asking the Moscow office of Doctors Without Borders to help politician Alexei Navalny, then imprisoned in a penal colony in Pokrov. The letter was signed by approximately two thousand people.

On April 26, 2021, Eidelman was detained by police, as stated, 'to investigate the violation of procedures for holding a [public] meeting'. The remand was allegedly connected with a demonstration in support of Alexei Navalny on 21 April, but Eidelman was not connected to the organizers.

In 2022, she condemned the 2022 Russian invasion of Ukraine, and left the country.

On June 18, 2026, the Moscow City Court sentenced Tamara Eidelman in absentia to eight years' imprisonment in a general regime penal colony and a five-year ban on activities related to posting information or administering websites and channels online. The court found her guilty under Article 354.1 of the Criminal Code of the Russian Federation (rehabilitation of Nazism) and Article 207.3 of the Criminal Code of the Russian Federation (dissemination of fake news about the army). The court also stripped her of her honorary title of "Honored Teacher of the Russian Federation."

== Personal life ==
Eidelman is the wife of Russian writer, archeologist and TV presenter Peter Aleshkovsky, though Eidelman and Aleshkovsky have been separated since 2000. Her children include photojournalist and public figure Dmitry Aleshkovsky and daughter Anya.

As of 2022, she has been living in Germany.
