= Molodaya Gvardiya (publisher) =

Publishing house in the USSR and Russia

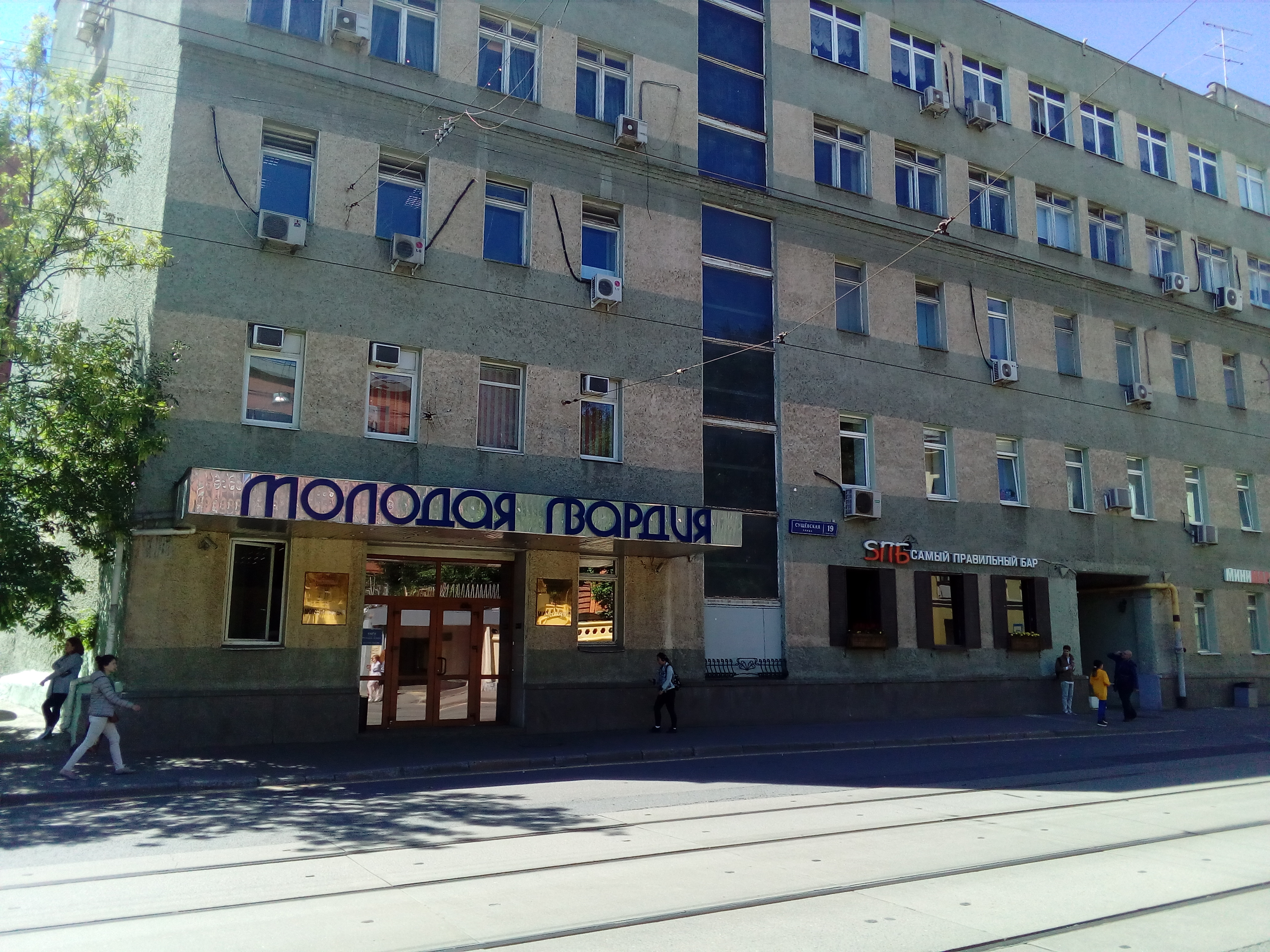
- The building of the Molodaya Gvardiya publishing house
- Status: Active
- Founded: 10 October 1922; 102 years ago
- Founder: Central Committee of the Komsomol
- Country of origin: Soviet Union; Russia
- Headquarters location: Moscow
- Key people: Valentin Fedorovich Yurkin (CEO); Andrey Vitalyevich Petrov (Director - Chief Editor)
- Official website: gvardiya.ru

Molodaya Gvardiya (Russian: Молодая гвардия, lit. Young Guard) is an open joint-stock Russian publishing house, one of the oldest publishers in Russia, having been founded in 1922 during the Soviet era. From 1938 until 1992, it was responsible for publishing the magazine Vokrug Sveta (Russian: Вокруг света, literally: "Around the World").

== History ==
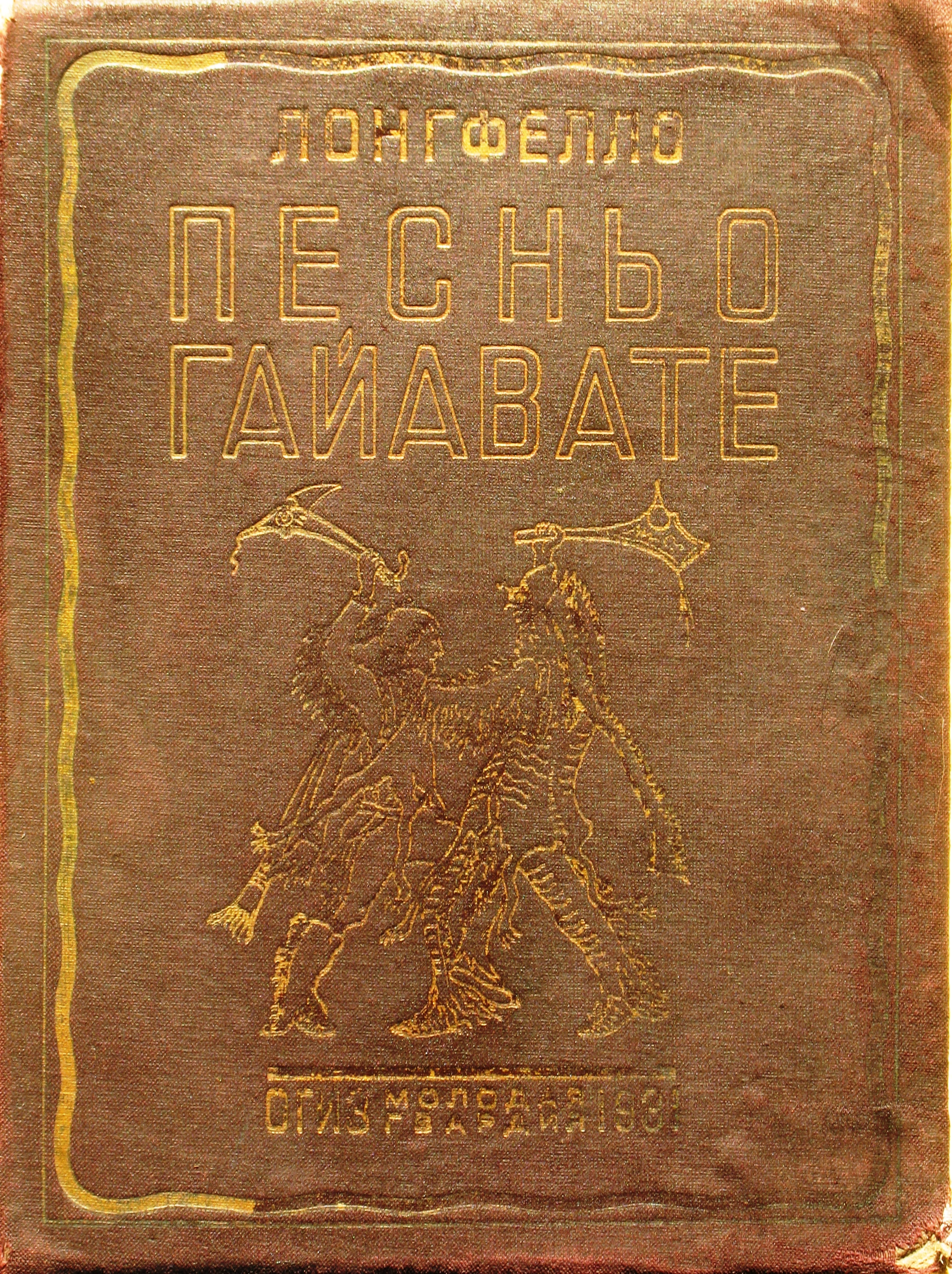
The Song of Hiawatha, 1931

1922 — The Molodaya Gvardiya publishing and printing association was founded in Moscow on the initiative of the Central Committee of the Komsomol on October 10. In the first year of the publishing house's operation, 71 books were published with a circulation of 584,000 copies.

1930s — The publishing house began to produce not only books, but also newspaper and magazine products.

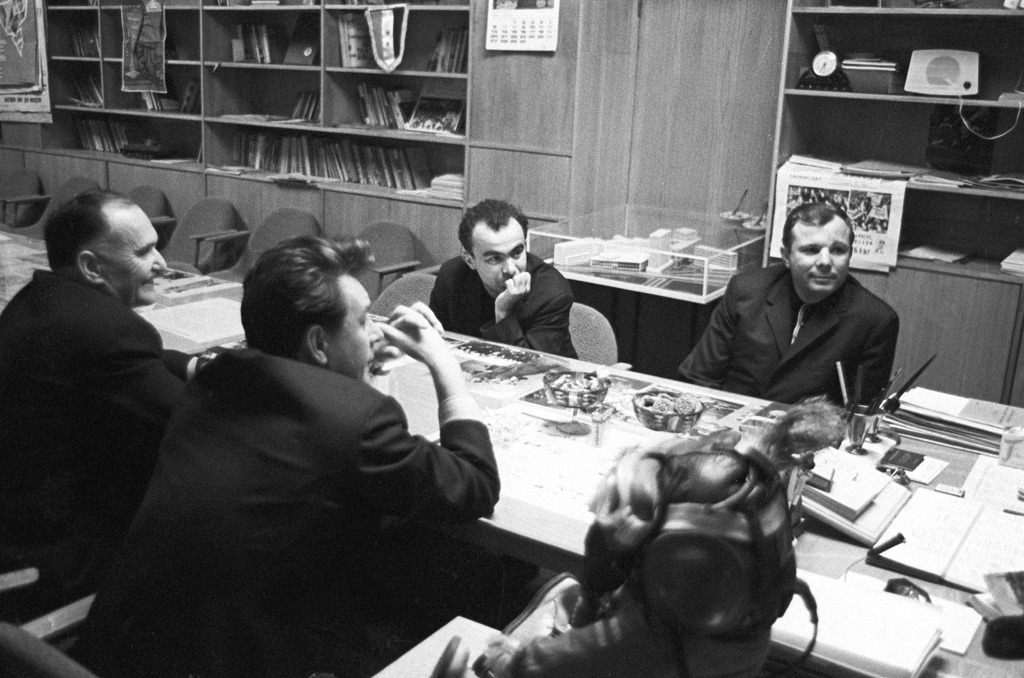
Yuri Gagarin at the Molodaya Gvardiya publishing house on the day he signed for the printing of his book Psychology and Space. Photo by RIA Novosti, 1968.

In 1968, Soviet pilot and cosmonaut Yuri Gagarin signed for the printing of his book Psychology and Space, written in collaboration with Vladimir Lebedev, which has been reprinted and translated into numerous languages. He also wrote the preface to the biography of Konstantin Tsiolkovsky in the ZhZL series in 1962.

1990s — The circulation of books was sharply reduced, with many series being discontinued.

2000s — A gradual process of reviving the activities of the publishing house was started.

In 2009, the ZhZL: Small Series was launched, which differs from the classic ZhZL series only in the volume of the material.

== Book series ==
- The Lives of Remarkable People (ZhZL) (Russian: Жизнь замечательных людей» (ЖЗЛ), romanized: Zhizn' zamechatel'nykh lyudey)
- The Lives of Remarkable People: The Biography Continues... (Russian: Жизнь замечательных людей: Биография продолжается..., romanized: Zhizn' zamechatel'nykh lyudey: Biografiya prodolzhayetsya...)
- The Lives of Remarkable People: Small Series (Russian: Жизнь замечательных людей. Малая серия, romanized: Zhizn' zamechatel'nykh lyudey. Malaya seriya)
- Living History: The Daily Life of Humanity (Russian: Живая история: Повседневная жизнь человечества, romanized: Zhivaya istoriya: Povsednevnaya zhizn' chelovechestva)
- You're On the Road, Romantic (Russian: Тебе в дорогу, романтик, romanized: Tebe v dorogu, romantik)
- Library of Contemporary Fiction (Russian: Библиотека современной фантастики, romanized: Biblioteka sovremennoi fantastiki)
- The Near Past (Russian: Близкое прошлое, romanized: Blizkoye proshloye)
- Case Number... (Russian: Дело №…, romanized: Delo №…)
- Russia and the World (Russian: Россия и мир, romanized: Rossiya i mir)
- Century Prose (Russian: Проза века, romanized: Proza veka)
- Golden Giraffe (Russian: Золотой жираф, romanized: Zolotoy zhiraf)
- Arrow (Russian: Стрела, romanized: Strela)
- Literary Solitaire (Russian: Литературный пасьянс, romanized: Literaturnyy pas'yans)
- Pioneer - Means First (Russian: Пионер — значит первый, romanized: Pioner — znachit pervyy)
- Sport and Personality (Russian: Спорт и личность, romanized: Sport i lichnost')
- Eureka (Russian: Эврика, romanized: Evrika)
- Heroes of the Patriotic War (Russian: Герои Отечественной войны, romanized: Geroi Otechestvennoy voyny)

== Awards and prizes ==
- Order of the Red Banner of Labour (1969)
- Lenin Komsomol Prize (1978)

== See also ==
- The Lives of Remarkable People
