= Moscow Pedagogical State University =

Major educational and scientific institution in Moscow, Russia

- Московский педагогический государственный университет
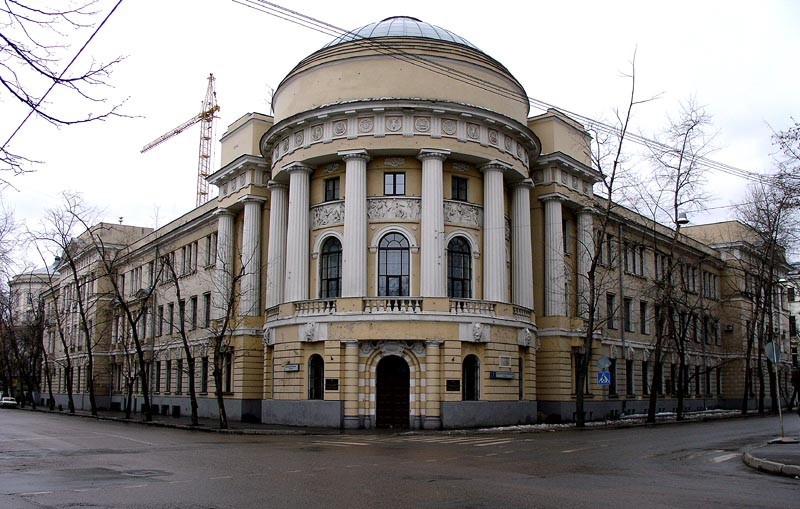
- Old main building, in Malaya Pirogovskaya
- Former names: Moscow University for Women (1872–1918); Second Moscow State University (1918–1930); Moscow State Pedagogical Institute (1930–1941, 1960–1990); Moscow State V. I. Lenin Pedagogical Institute (1941–1960)
- Type: Public
- Established: 1872, 1918
- Students: 20,000
- Location: Moscow, Russia; 55.6583°N 37.4767°E
- Website: www.mpgu.edu

University rankings

Regional – Overall
- QS Emerging Europe and Central Asia: 251-300 (2022)

Moscow Pedagogical State University (Basque: Московский педагогический государственный университет; MPGU) is an educational and scientific institution in Moscow, Russia, with eighteen faculties and seven branches operational in other Russian cities. The institution had undergone a series of name changes since its establishment in 1872.

== History ==
The university originates in the Moscow Higher Courses for Women founded by Vladimir Guerrier in 1872. It was subsequently reconstituted several times. In 1918 it admitted men and became the Second Moscow State University, then was reformed without its Medical and Chemical Technology schools as the Moscow State Pedagogical Institute, which for a time was known as the Moscow State V. I. Lenin Pedagogical Institute. In 1990, the institute regained the status of university and thus its present name.

=== Guerrier Courses (1872–1888) ===
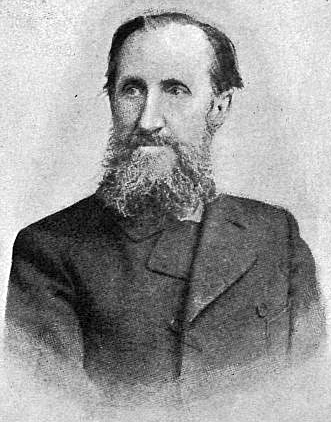
V. I. Guerrier, founder

In May 1872 the Russian minister of education, Count Dmitry Tolstoy, consented to the opening by Professor Guerrier of "Higher Women's Courses" as a private educational institution and approved Regulations for this purpose. In November 1872, the first building of the Moscow Higher Women's Courses was opened at Volkhonka, ushering in the era of higher education for women in Russia.

Initially, courses were for two years and were in humanities and natural sciences. At first, there were two departments, History & Philology and Physics & Mathematics. In Moscow alone, 1,232 women were admitted to the courses between 1872 and 1886.

A female student attending a course became known as a kursistka. While still a young doctor, Anton Chekhov paid for his sister Masha to attend Guerrier courses.

In 1886, the Ministry of Education prevented the admission of new students to Guerrier's courses, and they ended in 1888.

=== Public lectures and collective lessons (1888–1900) ===
Following the end of the Guerrier courses, public lectures for women were organized systematically, most of them given by the same teachers, and in the same premises, as before. The public lectures lasted until 1892, when they were closed by the government. From 1886 there were also collective lessons.

=== Moscow Higher Women's Courses, or Moscow University for Women (1900–1918) ===
In 1900 the name Moscow Higher Women's Courses was instituted, and in 1906 a School of Medicine was launched. Courses were taught by scholars. In 1907, educational buildings by the architect Soloviev opened in Little Tsaritsyn Street, now Small Pirogovskay Street. This is now the main building of the Moscow State Pedagogical University. In 1908 came the Anatomical Theatre, now the Russian State Medical University, and the Physical Chemistry Building, now the Moscow Academy of Fine Chemical Technology.

In 1915-1916, the Moscow Higher Women's Courses, sometimes called the Moscow University for Women, received the right of issuing diplomas. By 1918, the institution had 8,300 thousand students.

=== Second Moscow State University (1918–1930) ===
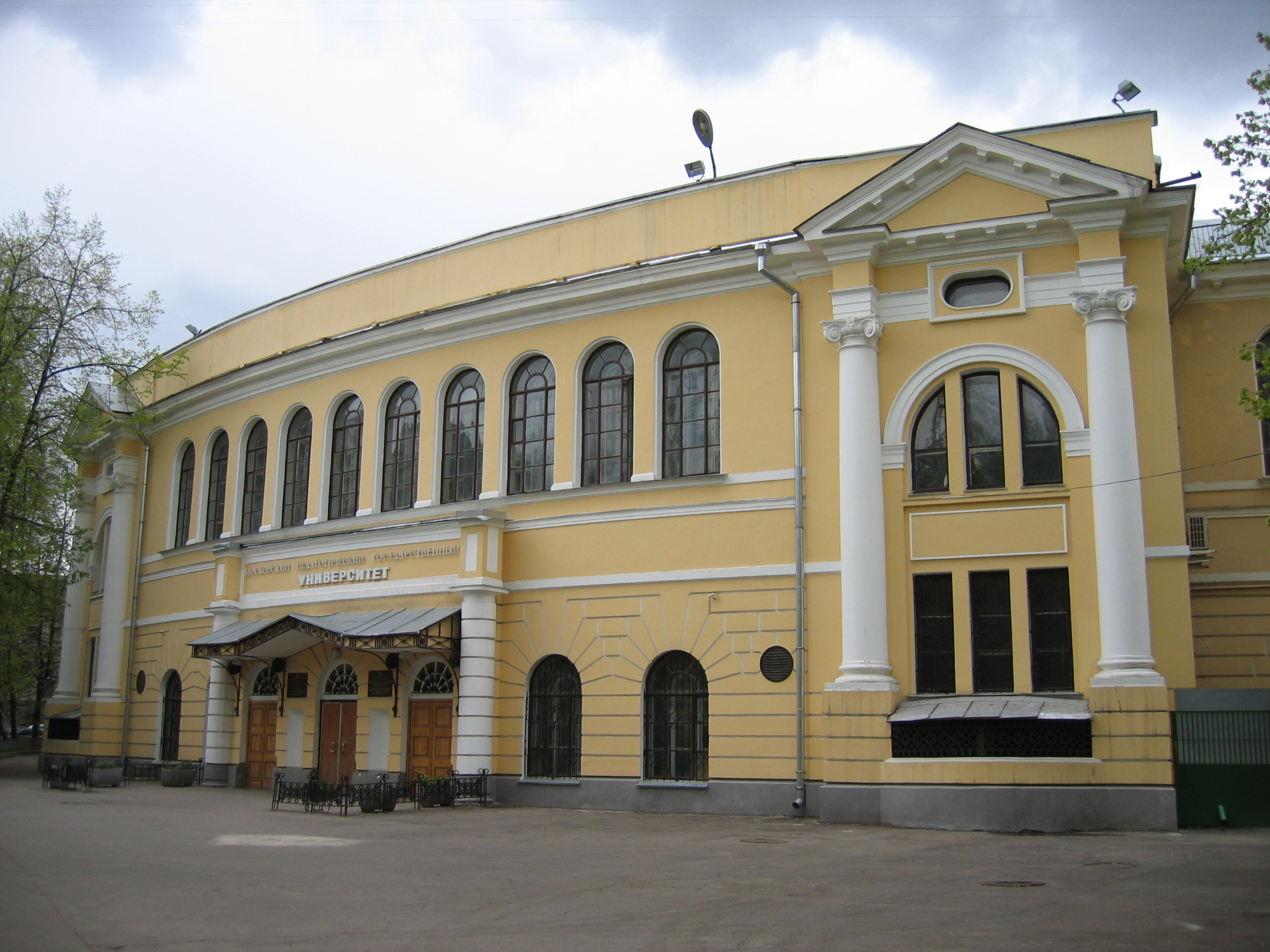
Main building of the University, view from the courtyard

In 1918, the university was renamed the Second Moscow State University and was often called also the Second Moscow University, beginning to admit men as well as women. During this period, the staff of the university included Dmitri Ivanovich Sakharov, the father of Andrei Sakharov.

From 1926, the university included a Department of Yiddish Language and Literature, the primary purpose of which was to train teachers for the Soviet Union's Yiddish language primary and secondary schools.

In 1927, day care nurseries for the children of students were in place, and in 1928 new buildings to provide accommodation for 1,000 students were built at a cost of one million Roubles.

From 1924 to 1930, the university's rector was Albert Petrovich Pinkevich, an educationist and author of The New Education in the Soviet Republic, who became a victim of Stalin's Great Purge, "disappearing" in 1937 to a Gulag labour camp.

=== Moscow State Pedagogical Institute (1930–1990) ===
In 1930, the Second Moscow University was divided into three separate institutions: the Second Moscow State Medical Institute (now the Russian State Medical University; the Moscow State Institute of Fine Chemical Technology (now the Moscow State University of Fine Chemical Technologies) and the Moscow State Pedagogical Institute, based on the teaching faculty.

By the mid-1930s the Yiddish department, now part of the institute and headed by Meir Wiener, had become one of the world's leading centres of Yiddish scholarship.

In 1960 it was combined with the Moscow City Pedagogical Institute.

In 1967, a Western writer on Russia called the Institute "...probably the most prestigious pedagogical institute in the USSR". Its student body then numbered 10,500.

=== Moscow Pedagogical State University (since 1990) ===
The institute regained the title of a university in 1990. In the year 1996-97, it had 12,000 students and six hundred academic staff. During that time, a bachelor's degree was awarded after four years of academic study, while the degree of Qualified Specialist, permitting a graduate to teach, was awarded after five years.

The Seventh International Bakhtin Conference took place at the university in June 1995.

== Present day ==
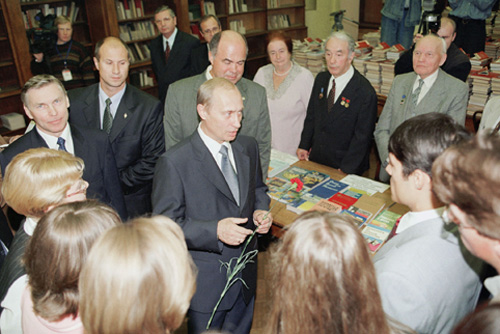
Vladimir Putin visits the University's Library in September 2001

The university now has eighteen faculties and 103 departments, some 20,000 students, and a faculty of 225 professors and over nine hundred assistant professors. Seventeen staff members were full and corresponding members of the Russian Academy of Sciences and the Russian Academy of Education in 2010. The Prometei publishing house, of Moscow, sometimes spelled Prometey, is attached to the university.

== Notable alumni ==
- Joe Adamov, radio commentator
- Marina Dobrovolskaya, politician, member of the State Duma
- Veronika Dolina, songwriter
- Elina Fuhrman, journalist, entrepreneur
- Nikolay Glazkov, poet
- Raisa Gorbachova, the wife of Mikhail Gorbachev
- Hoàng Thúy Toàn, literary translator
- Yuliy Kim, author
- Oleg Lekmanov, literary scholar, biographer, and professor
- Alla Masevich, astronomer
- Albert Muchnik, mathematician
- Roman Personov, physicist
- Lev Razgon, writer and the Memorial Society co-founder
- Alexey Venediktov, journalist
- Dmitry Vodennikov, author
- Lydia Pasternak Slater, chemist, poet and translator
- Yuri Vizbor, poet, bard, actor
- Vasily Vlasov, politician
- Galina Zaitseva, teacher of the Deaf

== Notable staff ==
- Viktor Idzio, historian
- Otto Schmidt, astronomer and member of the Supreme Soviet of the Soviet Union
- Eduard Shpolsky, physicist
- Igor Tamm, winner of the Nobel Prize in Physics of 1958
- Alexander Tubelsky, historian and university administrator

== See also ==
- List of modern universities in Europe (1801–1945)
