= Arzamas (website) =

Russian-language educational project

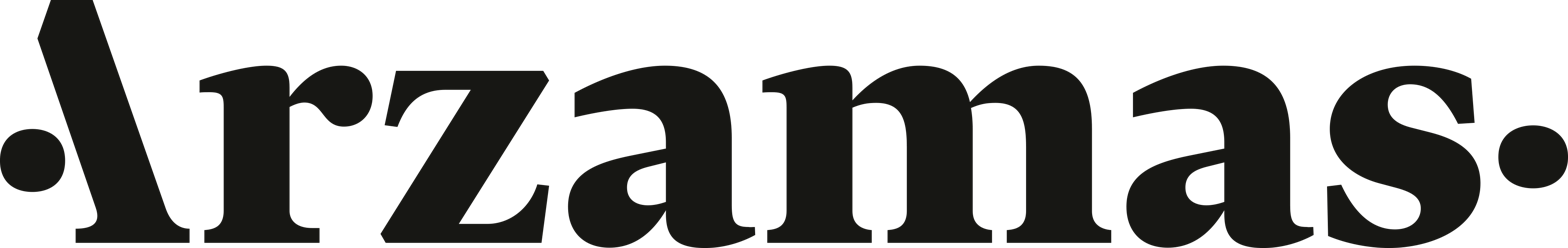
- Website type: Educational
- Available in: Russian, English
- Editors: Philipp Dzyadko, Alexander Borzenko, Kirill Golovastikov, Irina Kaliteyevskaya
- Website: arzamas.academy
- Registration: No
- Launched: 2015

Arzamas (Russian: Арзама́с) is a Russian educational website with courses on history, literature, philosophy, arts, and humanities. The website mostly educates through video lectures but it also has podcasts, quizzes, and articles. It also has uploaded some old original recordings. It often has lectures from experts as well as primary material for the users to look over. As of July the 1st there are 80 courses, which usually consist of five lectures and articles for the theme of the course, and a few special projects. It has a YouTube channel with over 1.5 million subscribers, its most popular video "Ancient Rome in 20 minutes" has over 19 million views in Russian, and is also available in an English version narrated by Brian Cox. It also has an Android and iOS application "Radio Arzamas" that contains audio versions of every course. The Calvert Journal characterizes it as depoliticizing history in Russia.

As of May 2020, Philipp Dzyadko is the editor-in-chief.

== Name ==
The website is named after the historical Arzamas Society, which was a literature society based in Saint Petersburg.

== History ==
Arzamas was launched in 2015. It was founded by Philipp Dzyadko and Danil Perushev.

In collaboration with Russian Presidential Academy of National Economy and Public Administration, Arzamas opened an online university. The idea belongs to Oxford professor Andrei Leonidovich Zorin.

== Applications ==
Arzamas made three mobile applications: three games, and a podcast applications with audio of their lectures.

== Awards ==
- 2017 – The course "All Russian literature of the XIX century in 230 cards" was awarded the Electronic Book of the Year award at the Book of the Year awards (Книга года)
- 2017 – The Russian Revolution course by Boris Kolonitskiy received the Enlightener Prize
