= Natan Eidelman =

Soviet author and historian (1930–1989)

Natan Eidelman

Natan Yakovlevich Eidelman (Russian: Ната́н Я́ковлевич Эйдельма́н) (18 April 1930 – 29 November 1989) was a Soviet Russian author and historian who was born and died in Moscow, who wrote several books on about the life and work of Alexander Pushkin, Decembrists Sergey Muravyov-Apostol and Mikhail Lunin, and historian Nikolai Mikhailovich Karamzin. He is the father of Tamara Eidelman.

== Biography ==
Born into the family of Yakov Naumovich and Maria Natanovna Eidelman. Graduated from the MSU Faculty of History in 1952. After graduating from university (1952), Natan Eidelman worked for six years as a history teacher at an evening school in the town of Likino-Dulyovo near Moscow, and from 1954 in Moscow. From 1959, he worked as a guide and then as a researcher at the Moscow Regional Museum of Local Lore in Istra.

He began to publish in 1960. In 1965, he defended his PhD thesis. Eidelman was a member of the Union of Soviet Writers since 1971, author of more than 20 books and about 300 articles.

He died on 29 November 1989, aged 59 and is buried in Moscow, at Kuntsevo Cemetery.

== Bibliography ==
- Conspiracy Against the Tsar. A Portrait of the Decembrists. Progress Moscow (1985); 294 pages.
- Apostol Sergei: povest' o Sergee Murav'eve-Apostole. Eidel'man, Natan Iakovlevich. Vagrius Moscow (2005); 349 pages.
- Lunin. Eidel'man, Natan Iakovlevich. Vagrius Moscow (2004); 413 pages.
- Pervyi dekabrist : povest' o neobyknovennoi zhizni i posmertnoi sud'be Vladimira Raevskogo. Eidel'man, Natan Iakovlevich. Vagrius Moskva (2005); 397 pages.
- Poslednii letopisets. Eidel'man, Natan Iakovlevich. Vagrius Moskva (2004); 247 pages.

== Books in Russian ==
- "Прекрасен наш союз ..."
- "Революция сверху" в России
- Александр Радищев
- Апостол Сергей
- Большой Жанно
- Братья Бестужевы
- Быть может за хребтом Кавказа
- Вьеварум; Лунин
- Грань веков
- Декабристы
- Заговор против царя
- Из потаенной истории России XVIII-XIX веков
- Мгновенье славы настает...
- Обреченный отряд
- Оттуда
- Первый декабрист
- Последний летописец
- Пушкин
- Пущин: Большой Жанно: Повесть об Иване Пущине
- Русский 1789-й
- Свободное слово Герцена
- Твой 18-й век; Прекрасен наш союз....
- Твой восемнадцатый век
- Твой девятнадцатый век
- Что там за морем - океаном

== See also ==
https://web.archive.org/web/20051120025451/http://vivovoco.rsl.ru/VV/PAPERS/NYE/EIDELMAN.HTM
