= Dmitry Mendeleev's Memorial Museum Apartment =

Museum in Saint Petersburg, Russia

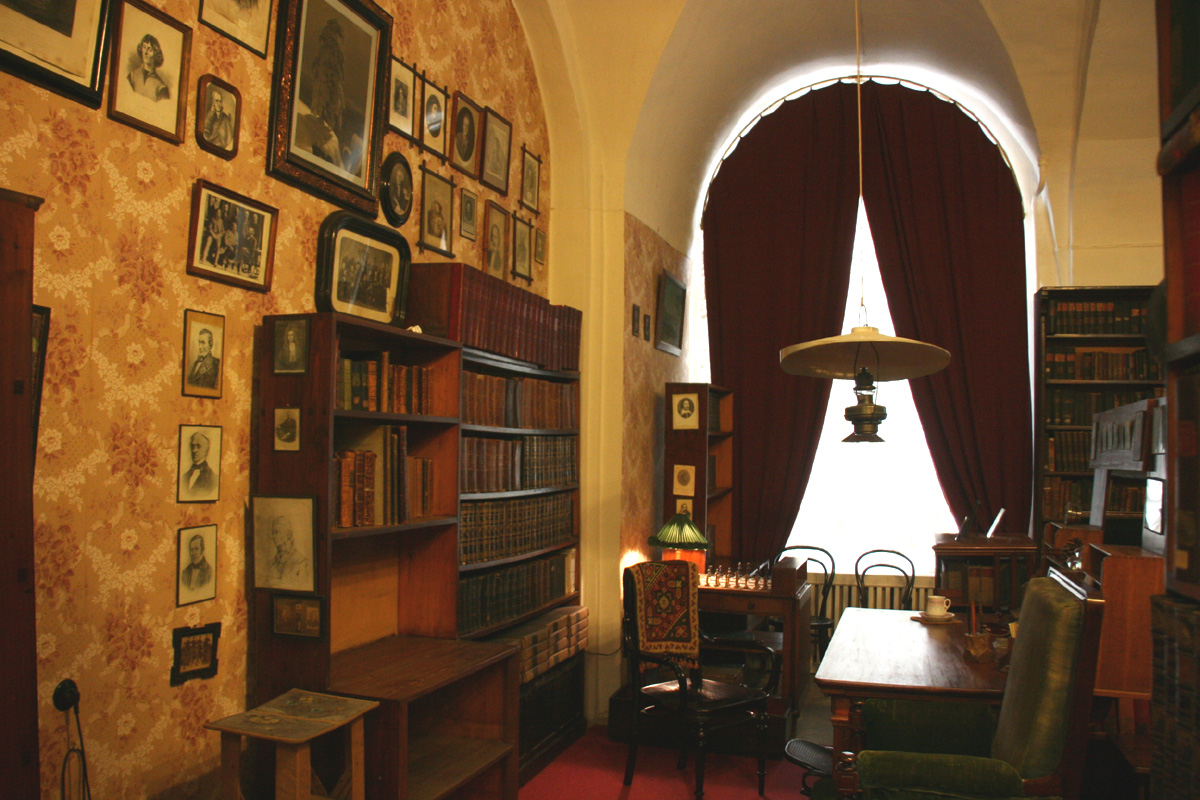
Mendeleev's office and library in his apartment in St. Petersburg

Dmitry Mendeleev's Memorial Museum Apartment is a museum apartment of the Russian chemist Dmitry Mendeleev, who is famous for establishing the Periodic table of arranging chemical elements by their atomic masses, which allowed the prediction of properties of elements (i.e., simple substances) yet to be discovered.

It is located in the Twelve Collegia building, now being the centre of Saint Petersburg State University, and in Mendeleev's time called Head Pedagogical Institute with his archives. The street in front of these is named after him as Mendeleevskaya liniya (Mendeleev Line). For security reasons access into the building in general is allowed mostly to authorized persons, such as students and staff of the university. All entrants are to present to the guards their identification documents.
