= Maria Dmitrievna Mendeleeva =

Russian person (1793–1850)

- Мария Дмитриевна Менделеева
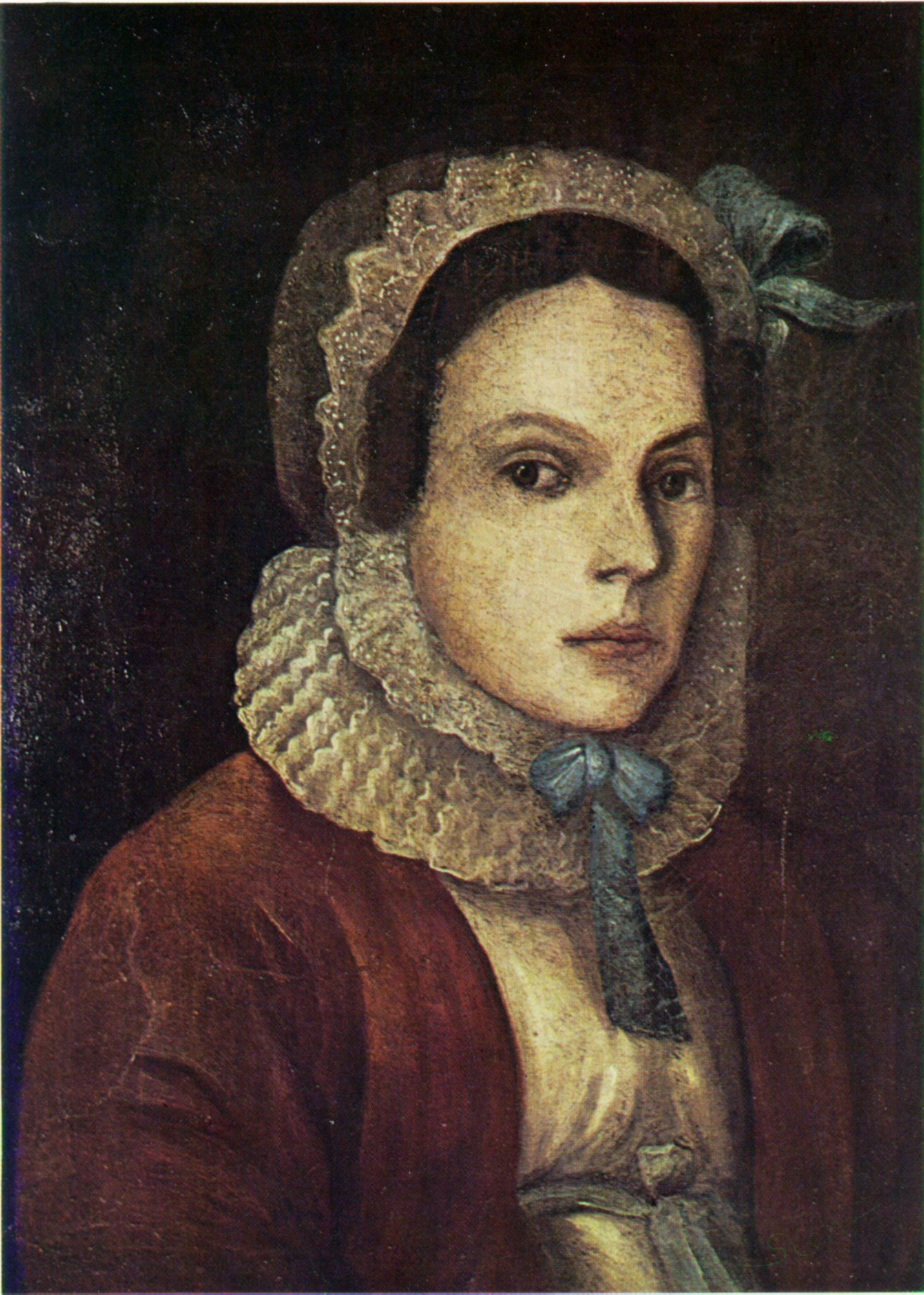
- Born: Maria Dmitrievna Kornilieva (Мария Дмитриевна Корнильева); 1793; Russian Empire
- Died: 1850 (aged 56–57); Russian Empire
- Spouse: Ivan Pavlovich Mendeleev (m. 1809; died 1847)
- Children: 17, including Dmitri Mendeleev

Maria Dmitrievna Mendeleeva (née Kornilieva; 1793–1850) was the mother of Dmitri Mendeleev.

== Early life ==
Mendeleeva came from a well-known family of Siberian merchants. They were the founders of the first Siberian printing house who traced their ancestry to Yakov Korniliev, a wealthy 17th-century posad merchant.

Maria Mendeleeva's mother died birthing her, and so she was raised by her nanny. She was not allowed to go to school due to sexism, and instead learned by herself from the work that her brother, Vasily Dmitrievich, brought home from his lessons and from her father's large collection of books.

== Midlife ==
In 1809, at age 14, she married Ivan Pavlovich Mendeleev, a school principal and a teacher of fine arts, politics and philosophy.

Maria birthed 17 children, of whom "only 14 stayed alive to be baptized" according to her son Pavel. The Mendeleevs raised their children as Orthodox Christians. Maria encouraged her youngest child, Dmitri, to "patiently search divine and scientific truth". She encouraged all of her children to read, calling books, "the gift of words on paper".

In 1823, Ivan was dismissed from his teaching position and the family moved to the village of Aremzyanskoye. In 1834, the same year that Maria's youngest child, Dmitri was born, Ivan became blind due to cataracts and unable to work.

Maria's brother, Vasily Korniliev, owned a dormant glass factory in Aremzyanskoye. He passed the management to Maria who reopened the factory and restarted production. After Ivan Mendeleev's death from tuberculosis in 1847, the large family lived Maria's income from managing the factory. Later Dmitri would recall: "There, at the glass factory managed by my mother, I received my first impressions of nature, people, and industrial affairs.

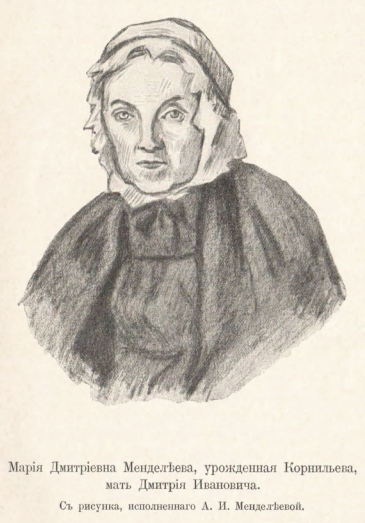
A sketch of Maria Mendeleev by A. I. Mendeleeva, from the Family Chronicle in Letters (available on wikimedia commons)

In 1848, the factory burned down. By 1849, Maria had settled her affairs in Aremzyanskoye and moved with her daughter Elizaveta and son Dmitri across country to Moscow. She intended to enroll Dmitri in Moscow University, but found that due to red tape, because they were coming from the Tobolsk region, he could not be admitted. Maria persisted, and moved with her children to Saint Petersburg, an arduous 700km trip by horse and cart. There, she was again foiled as Dmitri was rejected from the main university, and instead enrolled at the Chief Pedagogical Institute, previously known only for teacher training. However, the Institute was changing. That autumn, Dmitri joined the physical–mathematical track, enjoyed lectures from visiting University professors and achieved good grades. A few weeks after Dmitri's enrollment, Maria died of tuberculosis in 1850. Dmitri recorded her last words to him as, "The hopes of my old age were based on you."

== Legacy ==
Dmitri was eventually able to receive a full education at Saint Petersburg State University and would go on to formulate the periodic law and creating a version of the periodic table of elements among other achievements. His mother's influence on his life and success was clear to him as he wrote in the dedication to his first major work, "The study of aqueous solutions by specific gravity":

"Dedicated to the memory of his mother, Maria Dmitrievna Mendeleyeva. You raised your lastborn [the seventeenth of those born by you] to his feet, fed him with your labor [after the death of his father], running the factory business, you taught him to love nature with its truth, science with its truth..., the homeland with all its inseparable [riches, gifts]..., most of all, labor with all its sorrows and joys, labor with [its] inclinations. .., you made him learn to work and see in it alone the support of everything, you took him away with these suggestions and trustingly gave him over to science, consciously feeling that this would be your last work. Dying, you instilled love, labor and perseverance. Having received from you... so much, even if small, perhaps the last, I honor your memory."

In another introduction, he wrote:

"This investigation is dedicated to the memory of a mother by her youngest offspring. Conducting a factory, she could educate him only by her own work. She instructed him by example, corrected with love, and in order to devote him to science she left Siberia with him, spending thus her last resources and strength. When dying, she said, 'Refrain from illusions, insist on work, and not on words. Patiently search divine and scientific truth'."
