= Mendeleev's Ural Expedition =

1899 Russian scientific expedition to the Urals led by Dmitri Mendeleev

The Ural expedition (Russian: Ура́льская экспеди́ция) was a scientific research and inspection expedition initiated by Dmitri Mendeleev to study the Ural metallurgical, mining, and forestry industries, to forecast the region's development, and to devise recommendations for overcoming the monopolism and backwardness of the economy and industry of the Urals.

A commission for studying the crisis state of Ural industry, headed by D. I. Mendeleev, carried out the expedition to the manufacturing and mining centres of the Urals in the summer of 1899. Also taking part in the expedition were P. A. Zemyatchensky, a professor at Saint Petersburg Imperial University; S. P. Vukolov, assistant head of the scientific and technical laboratory of the Naval Ministry; as well as representatives of the Ministry of State Property, the Ministry of State Properties, the Permanent Consultative Office of Ironworks Owners, and other institutions.

== Preparations ==
Speaking of his third way of serving to the Motherland:" (Note: In a private letter (that was never sent) to S. Yu. Witte, D. I. Mendeleev, reviewing and assessing his many years of activity, described three ways of serving to the Motherland: 1. His scientific reputation, which he considered a source of pride not only for himself but for Russia as a whole. 2. Teaching, to which he devoted the best years and main strength of his life, noting that many of his thousands of students had gone on to become notable figures, professors and administrators, and that he had always felt he had planted something worthwhile in them rather than merely fulfilling an obligation. 3. Working, to the best of his ability, for the benefit of the growth of Russian industry.) Mendeleev attached particular importance to this undertaking and to the work that would sum up the expedition's results. The scientist prepared for it long and carefully. On 10 March 1899 he drew up a memorandum for a conference at the Ministry of Finance, scheduled for 18 March and devoted to the reorganisation of the Ural state-owned mining works. The memorandum was addressed to the deputy minister of finance, V. N. Kokovtsov, in which D. I. Mendeleev put forward several recommendations. Among the principal measures, he pointed to the need to transfer state-owned works to the Ministry of War and the Naval Ministry, as those best suited to serve the interests of national defence. The remaining state-owned mining works, in Mendeleev's view, should gradually be transferred into private hands to encourage competition, raise productivity and lower prices, while ore deposits and forests remaining in state ownership should be made to generate revenue. In his memorandum, the scientist drew attention to one of the causes hindering the development of the Urals, namely that the region was almost entirely dominated by a handful of large entrepreneurs who had appropriated everything for themselves. He saw the way to overcome this entrenched monopolism in ensuring that, alongside the large enterprises, many small ones should be given support for their development. D. I. Mendeleev called for the accelerated construction of a railway network that would stimulate the growth of production. These and other recommendations were made by him long before the Ural expedition itself.

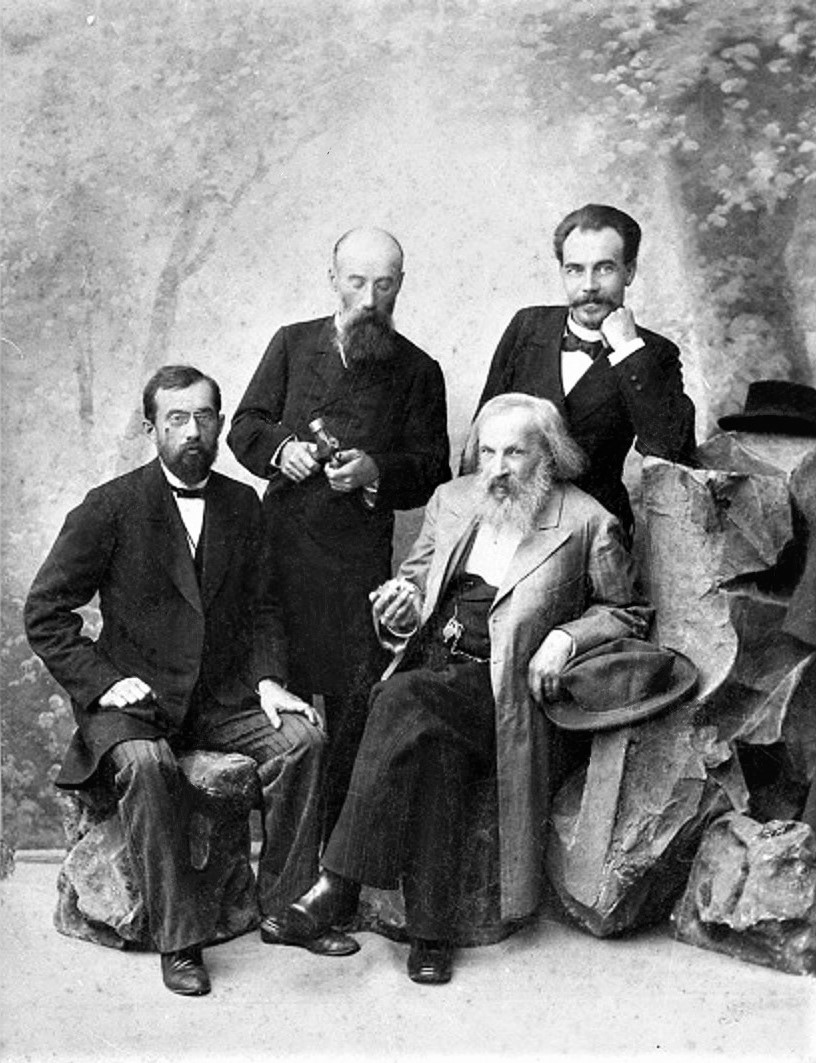
Mendeleev's Ural Expedition Staff

On 14 May 1899, the director of the Department of Industry and Trade, V. I. Kovalevsky, wrote to D. I. Mendeleev asking him to take charge of the Commission for the Study of the Crisis State of Ural Industry. On 19 May the expedition was approved by the minister of finance, S. Yu. Witte, with Mendeleev placed in charge. Also included were the head of the department of mineralogy at Saint Petersburg Imperial University, Professor P. A. Zemyatchensky, a specialist in iron ore; S. P. Vukolov, a chemist and assistant head of the scientific and technical laboratory of the Naval Ministry; and K. N. Yegorov, junior inspector of the Main Chamber of Weights and Measures. Mendeleev received official confirmation of the expedition's approval from Kovalevsky on 26 May.

In late May and early June 1899, Mendeleev prepared for the expedition by gathering material on the state of Ural industry. He wrote to several owners of private Ural works asking them to "assist in the study of the state of the iron trade". Replies with invitations to visit their enterprises came from the owners and managers of the Verkh-Isetsky, Yugo-Kamsky, Tirlyansky, Beloretsk, and Kizel works, among others. S. S. Abamelek-Lazarev sent a letter containing a detailed account of the Ural mining and metalworking industry. As part of his preparations, Mendeleev also made preliminary calculations of pig-iron and iron output and discussed the details of the trip with his assistants; three expedition routes were mapped out, covering 25 enterprises. Even at the preparatory stage, Mendeleev identified what he believed to be the main causes of the stagnation of Ural industry, among them the excessive concentration of land in few hands, owners' reliance solely on their own forests, the underdevelopment of transport links, and a lack of entrepreneurial initiative among the owners.

Despite feeling unwell, Mendeleev did not abandon the trip. On 8 June he left Saint Petersburg by train, passing through Moscow, where he was joined by Vukolov and Yegorov, and Nizhny Novgorod, arriving in Perm on 18 June. There, Mendeleev and his assistants held several meetings with factory owners and government officials before leaving for Kizel on 19 June.

== Staff and routes ==
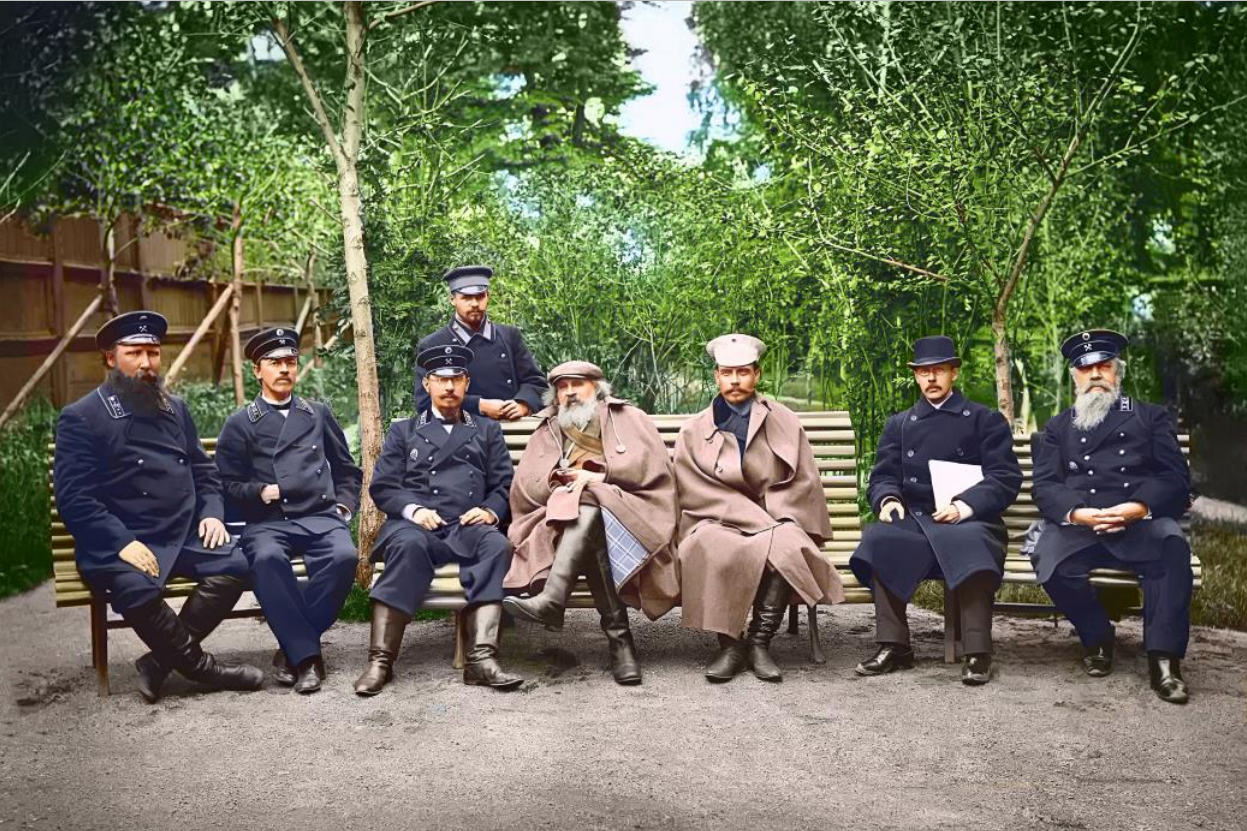
The expedition at the Kushva works

The expedition at the Kushva works, 24 June 1899

Seated: N. N. Apykhtin (manager of mines and mining operations of the Goroblagodatsky Mining District), N. S. Kopylov (manager of the Verkhneturinsky works), A. N. Kuznetsov (manager of the Kushvinsky works), D. I. Mendeleev, P. A. Zemyatchensky, M. M. Dmitrievsky (director of the Perm Realschule), N. A. Salarev (official for special assignments of the Ural Mining Administration). Standing: V. V. Mamontov (secretary of the delegates from the Congress of Ural Mine Owners)

The researchers' personal routes of who made up the Ural expedition varied according to the tasks each was to carry out. Mendeleev assigned Vukolov and Yegorov to inspect a number of Ural works and carry out full magnetic surveys in order to detect the anomalies associated with the presence of iron ore. Yegorov was also tasked with studying the Ekibastuz coal deposit, which D. I. Mendeleev considered highly important for the development of Ural metallurgy. Also accompanying the expedition were N. A. Salarev, a representative of the Ministry of State Properties, and V. V. Mamontov, secretary of the Permanent Consultative Office of Ironworks Owners.

Mendeleev himself travelled from Perm along the route Kizel – Chusovaya – Kushva – Mount Blagodat – Nizhny Tagil – Mount Vysokaya – Yekaterinburg – Tyumen, from where he continued by steamship to Tobolsk. From Tobolsk he again travelled by steamship to Tyumen and then on: Yekaterinburg – Bilimbay – Yekaterinburg – Verkhny Ufaley – Kyshtym. After Kyshtym, an old illness of D. I. Mendeleev's recurred — he began coughing up blood — and he stopped in Zlatoust, hoping to rest and "set out again for the works", but his condition did not improve, and he returned to Boblovo by way of Ufa and Samara. Nevertheless, D. I. Mendeleev noted that already in Yekaterinburg he had obtained a sufficiently good picture of the state of affairs in the Ural iron industry.

== Results and conclusions ==
In his report — a memorandum addressed to S. Yu. Witte — D. I. Mendeleev identified the principal causes of the slow development of metallurgy and set out measures for overcoming this state of affairs. He attached particular importance to raising Ural industry to an appropriate level, writing that Russia's influence over the whole of western Siberia and the steppe heartland of Asia could and should be exercised through the Ural region.

D. I. Mendeleev saw the principal cause of the economic stagnation of Ural industry in the socio-economic archaism prevailing there, the monopolism of the treasury and the large works-owners, the surviving remnants of possessional right, and the isolation of the Ural territory from markets in the central part of the country. He wrote that it was necessary, with particular insistence, to do away with all remaining traces of the landlord-type relations that still existed throughout the Urals in the form of peasants bound to the works. Mendeleev also noted that the Ural mining administration hindered the development of small enterprises, whereas, in his view, genuine industrial development was inconceivable without free competition between small and medium-sized works-owners and large ones.

Among the possible measures for correcting the situation, Mendeleev identified the need to reform land relations and the system of managing the mining and works economy, to develop private leasing, to establish a Ural centre for mining-technical education, to switch to the use of coal as fuel, and to intensify railway construction.

The trip also provided a practical foundation for developing his idea of underground coal gasification, which he had first proposed during a trip to the Donbas in 1888, and to which he returned repeatedly in later articles and major works, including Combustible Materials (1893), Foundations of Factory and Works Industry (1897), and The Study of Industry (1900–1901). Mendeleev pointed out that monopolists enjoying government protection were holding back the industrial development of the region, a state of affairs reflected in high prices, complacency with what had already been achieved, and a halt in development. He would later remark that this cost him "much effort and unpleasantness".

Over the course of a month, around 40 mining and metallurgical enterprises were inspected. Through D. I. Mendeleev's Ural expedition, a thorough and wide-ranging scientific inspection was carried out of the economy, geology and industry of the Urals, and recommendations were made for their development. In 1900, a detailed report titled The Ural Iron Industry in 1899 was published based on the expedition's findings, under the general editorship of D. I. Mendeleev (the main section, drawing also on his own many years of observation, was written by Mendeleev himself). The report set out all the assessments made by the commission and gave detailed recommendations concerning the metallurgical and forestry industries, transport links, and general economic questions.

Involvement in the study of the Ural iron industry was one of the most important episodes in Mendeleev's career as an economist. In his work Towards an Understanding of Russia, he would write that in his life he had had occasion to take part in the fate of three matters: oil, coal, and iron ore. From the Ural expedition, the scientist brought back invaluable material, which he later drew on in his works The Study of Industry and Towards an Understanding of Russia.

== Bibliography ==
=== Print sources ===
- Mendeleev, D. I., ed. (1900). Уральская железная промышленность в 1899 году [The Ural Iron Industry in 1899] (in Russian). Saint Petersburg: Типография В. Демакова: издание Министерства финансов по департаменту торговли и мануфактур.
- Mendeleev, D. I. (1949). Работы в области металлургии [Studies in the field of metallurgy]. In Khlopin, V. G. (ed.). Сочинения [Works] (in Russian). Vol. 12. Leningrad–Moscow: Academy of Sciences of the USSR Press.
- Shchukarev, S. A.; Valk, S. N., eds. (1951). Автобиографические материалы [Autobiographical materials]. Архив Д. И. Менделеева [The Archive of D. I. Mendeleev] (collection of documents) (in Russian). Vol. 1. Leningrad: Zhdanov Leningrad State University Press.
- Storonkin, A. V., ed. (1984). Летопись жизни и деятельности Д. И. Менделеева [Chronicle of the Life and Work of D. I. Mendeleev] (in Russian). Leningrad: Nauka.
- Starikov, V. I. (1984). Д. И. Менделеев [D. I. Mendeleev] (in Russian). Sverdlovsk: Sredne-Uralskoye Book Publishing House.
- Alekseev, V. V., ed. (2000). Уральская историческая энциклопедия [Ural Historical Encyclopedia] (in Russian). Yekaterinburg: Наука. p. 339.
- Alekseev, V. V.; Gavrilov, D. V. (2008). Металлургия Урала с древнейших времён до наших дней [Metallurgy of the Urals from Ancient Times to the Present Day] (in Russian). Moscow: Наука. p. 182.
- Ponizovkin, A. (April 2016). Уральский след Менделеева [Mendeleev's Ural trail]. Наука Урала [Science of the Urals] (in Russian) (7). Yekaterinburg: Ural Branch of the Russian Academy of Sciences: 4–5. Archived from the original on 14 February 2022.

=== Online sources ===
- Svechkov, D. (7 June 2014). "Обнародованы личные записи Менделеева об экспедиции на Урал" [Mendeleev's personal notes on the Ural expedition made public]. Komsomolskaya Pravda. Archived from the original on 14 February 2022.
- Sokolova, G. (28 August 2015). "Урал в таблице Менделеева" [The Urals in Mendeleev's table]. Oblastnaya Gazeta. Archived from the original on 14 February 2022.
