= Pyrocollodion =

Type of smokeless powder

Pyrocollodion is a smokeless powder invented by Dmitri Mendeleev. A variant of the nitrocellulose family of compounds, Mendeleev discovered it in 1892. He had proposed its use as a replacement for gunpowder in the Russian Navy. This offer was rejected because of cost and efficiency considerations.

Pyrocollodion is known to be spontaneously combustible and explosive. When ignited, Pyrocollodion will burn and explode quickly with excessive heat output compared to the existing gunpowders of the time. Pyrocollodion was a reasonable choice or option at the time for military munitions use. If ignited in a tight, contained space, Pyrocollodion will leave little to no remnants (such as unburned powder), particular kinds of flame scarring, or smoke of any kind.
