= D. I. Mendeleev Institute for Metrology =

Russian research institute

Coordinates: 59.9176°N 30.3151°E

D. I. Mendeleev Institute for Metrology (Russian: Всероссийский научно-исследовательский институт имени Д. И. Менделеева; VNIIM), previously known as the Main Chamber of Weights and Measures of the Russian Empire, or the Depot of Exemplary Measures and Weights, is one of the leading national metrology institutes of Russia now.

== History ==
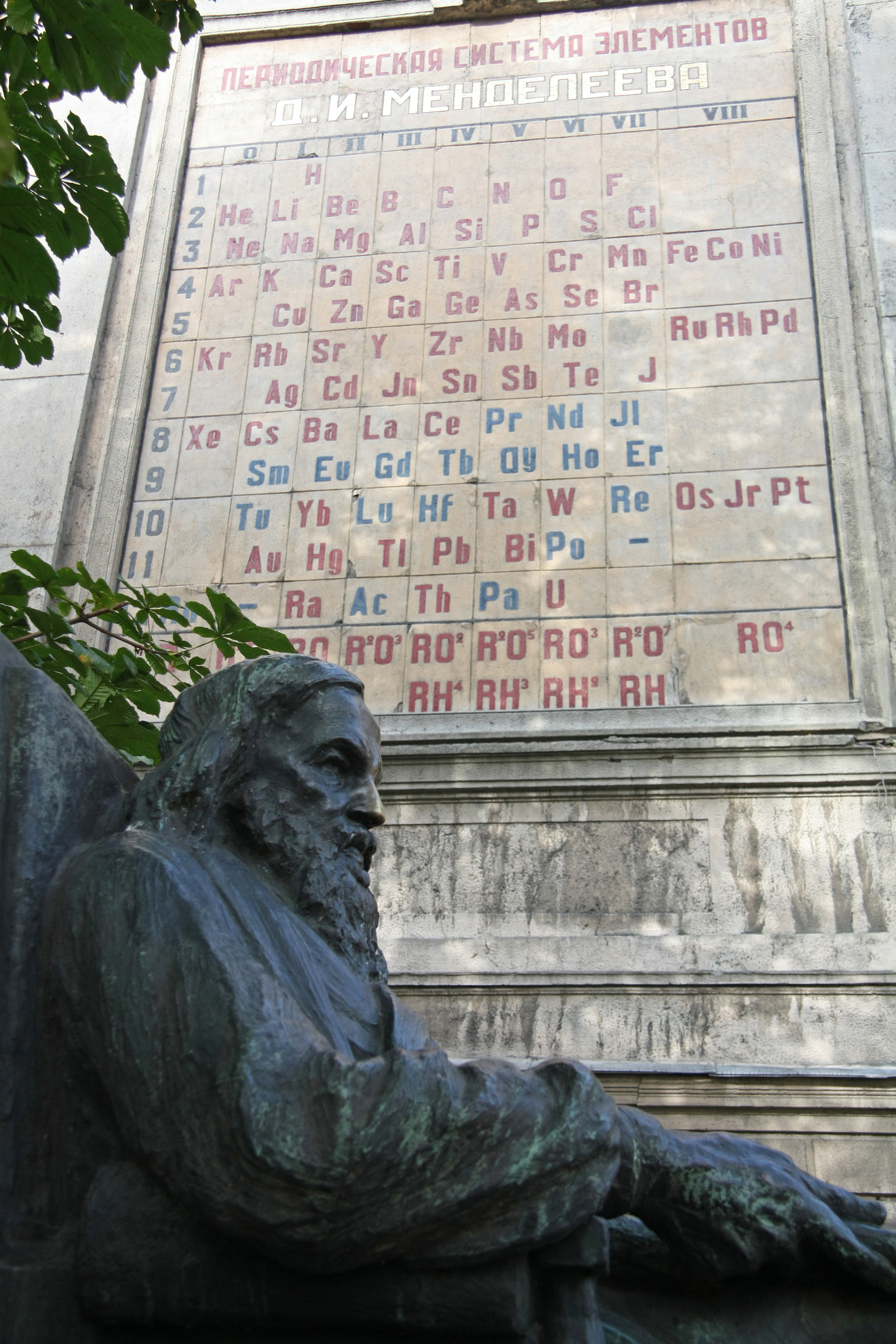
Mendeleev's monument

State regulation of weights and measures in Russia was patchy and piecemeal until 29 April 1797, when Tsar Paul I issued a standardization edict aimed primarily at reducing fraud. Institutions for implementing this law followed, with a division overseeing standardisation being added to St Petersburg's Department of City Management, for example, on 19 September 1798. On 11 January 1798, a further law stipulated that State Councillor Gaskonii would supervise the production of official weights at the Aleksandrovskii factory, and these would be the only official measures in the realm. In practice, however, application of these laws was inconsistent.

In 1835 (around the same time as the UK's Weights and Measures Act 1824 and France's 1837 consolidation of its switch to metric), Tsar Nicholas I enacted a new push to standardise weights and measures. The Commission of Exemplary Weights and Measures had been formed in 1827, superseded in 1832–33 by the Commission for the Introduction of the Unitarity of Russian Weights and Measures. On 4 June 1842, an ancillary protocol to the 1835 act required that copies of the standards set in 1835 be distributed throughout the empire, and to achieve this, the Depot of Exemplary Measures and Weights was founded in Saint Petersburg and placed under the control of the Learned Storekeeper – the first person to hold this role was Adolph Kupfer. This standardisation correlated with the introduction of major railway building, and legal reform, making it part of a wider imperial, ideological programme. Kupfer's successor was V. S. Glukhov. It was originally located in the building of the Peter and Paul Fortress in St. Petersburg.

In 1892, Dmitri Mendeleev was appointed third scientific custodian of the Depot, a post which he occupied until his death in 1907. On his initiative, in 1893 the organization was transformed into The Chief Bureau of Weights and Measures (the Main Chamber of Weights and Measures). The main goals of the new institution were to unify the many different weights and measures used in the diverse Russian Empire, achieve their regulation in trade and industry, and orchestrate the eventual conversion to the metric system. The introduction of the metric system into Russia for optional use in 1899 and then completely in 1918, is intimately bound with the work of D. I. Mendeleev as director of the Bureau. The Bureau began publishing a scholarly journal, Vremennik Glavnoi Palaty mer i vesov in 1894.

Years later, the Research Institute of Metrology and Standardization was established on its basis. In memory of Mendeleev's contribution to the development of metrology, a monument to Mendeleev and his periodic table of elements were placed on the territory of the institute.

== Current state ==
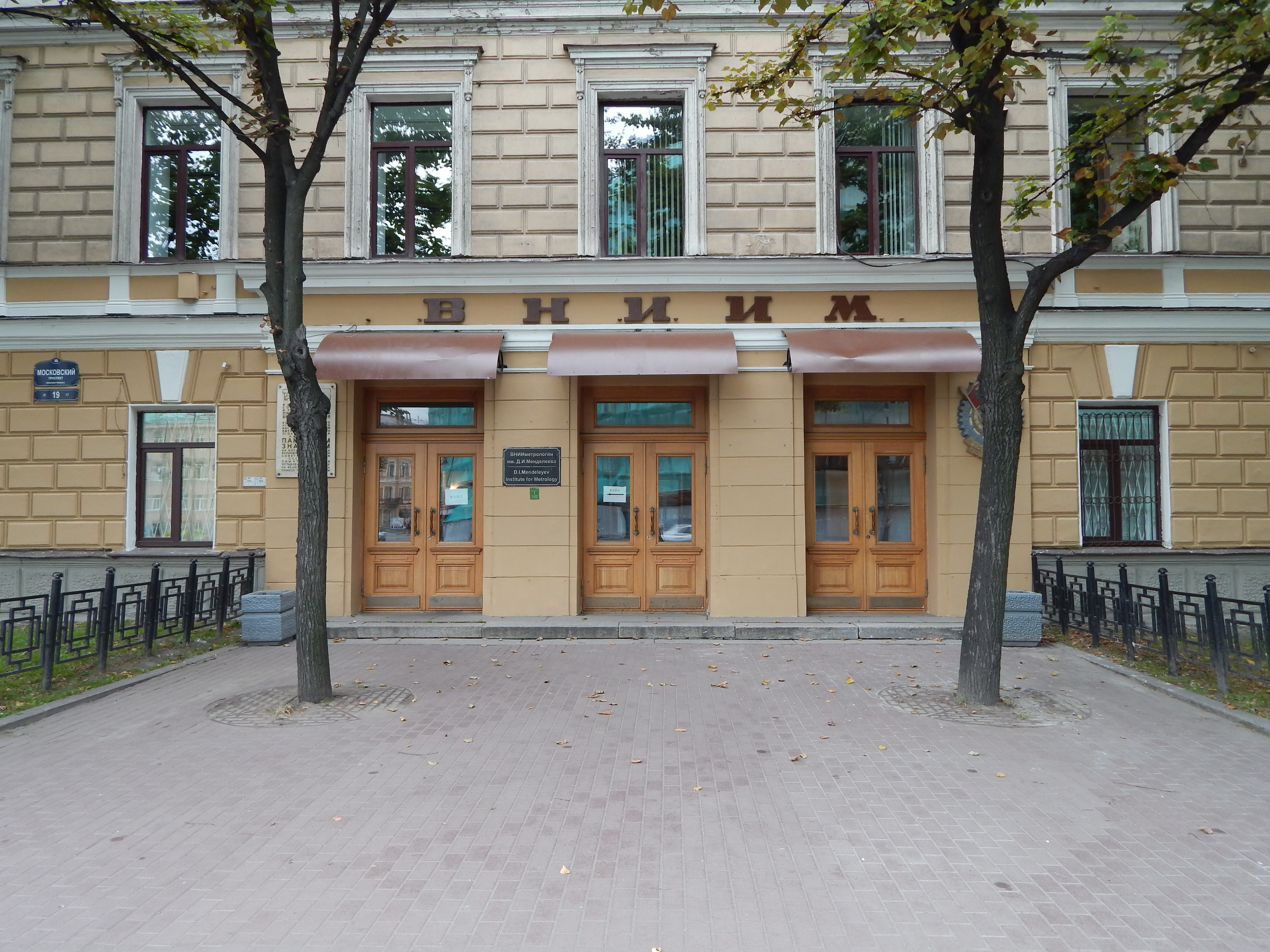
D. I. Mendeleev Institute for Metrology in St. Petersburg in 2013

The Institute is one of the largest world centers of fundamental and applied metrology, the main center of state primary standards of Russia. There are 54 (out of 165) state primary standards (GGE), corresponding to the eight measurement areas of the International Bureau for Weights and Measures (BIPM). Of the seven core units of the International System of Units SI, four are represented at the institute: meter, kilogram, ampere, and kelvin.

VNIIM represents the Russian Federation in international metrology organizations and advisory committees of the International Bureau of Weights and Measures. The scientists of the institute head four of the twelve technical committees of the COOMET regional metrology organization.

The Institute is a center for training and retraining of metrologists. There is a council for the defense of dissertations for the degrees of candidate of science and doctor of science, postgraduate study is offered.

== Metrological museum of Gosstandart of Russia ==
Located in the institute's old building, the museum possesses unique monuments of the history of metrology: Russian and foreign reference measures, balances, measuring instruments, rare archive documents and photos, books of the 18–20th centuries. The first collections of the museum were formed in 1830 when the system of measures was being developed on a scientific basis in Russia. Now a significant part of the museum exhibits is related to the activities of Mendeleev.
