= Lines of Vasilyevsky Island =

The lines of Vasilyevsky Island (Rus. plural linii линии, singular liniya (also linia) линия "a line") are a group of streets in a part (called Vasilyevsky Island) of downtown Saint Petersburg, Russia, and their mostly numeric names atypical for the rest of the modern Saint Petersburg.

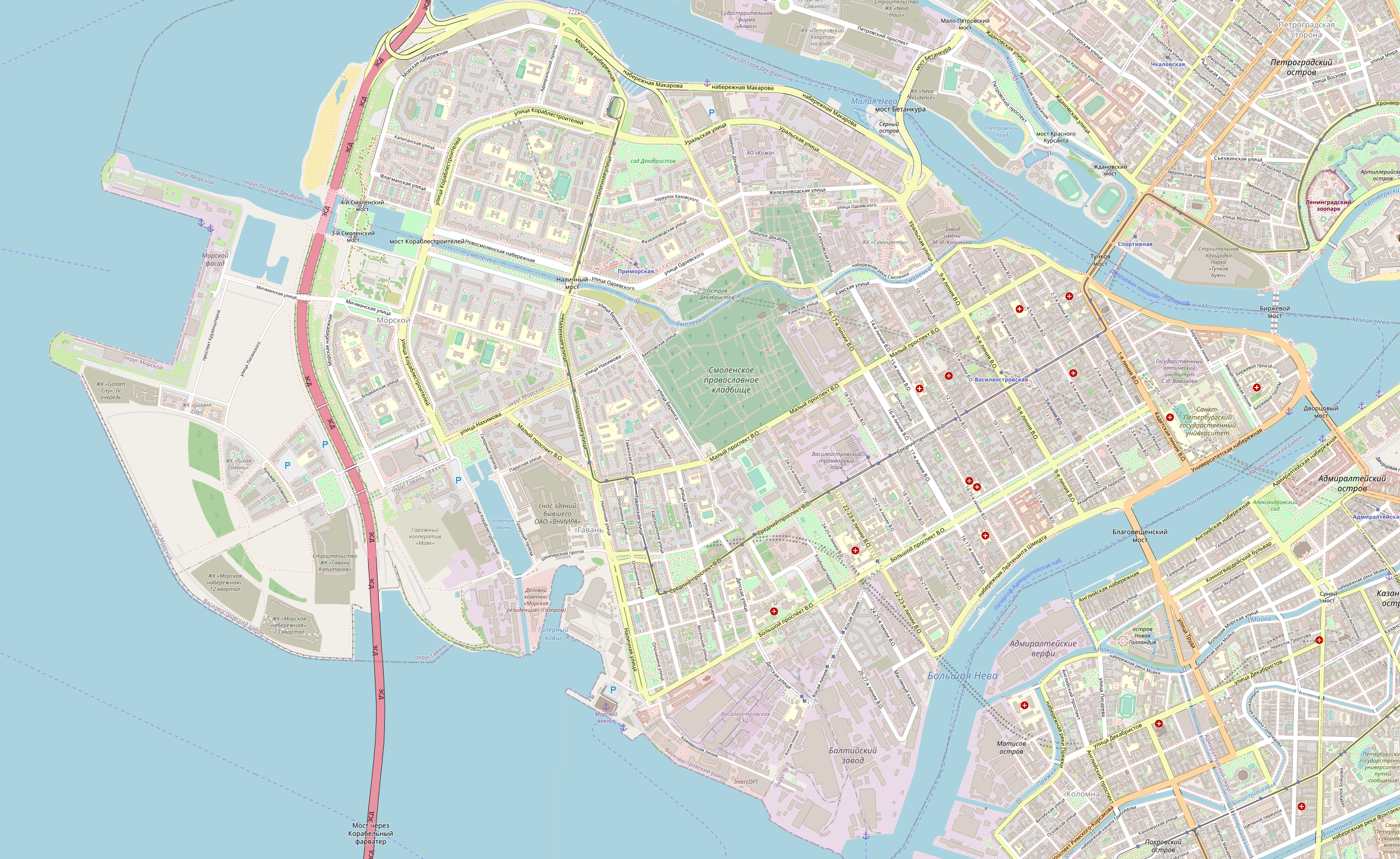
Vasilyevsky Island in St. Petersburg

== History ==
After capturing Ingria, the territory of the future Saint Petersburg, from Sweden in Great Northern War, Peter the Great of Russia planned the future city with a number of courtiers and experts, most notably the architect Domenico Trezzini.

Vasilyevsky Island was to be an administrative center of the city and the Russian Empire with its projected governmental departments (colleges) building (the Twelve Collegia).

Planned in the manner of Peter's favourite European maritime cities, Amsterdam and Venice, the island was to have its own rectangular grid of canals which later turned into straight streets (with lines of houses on their sides), as the canals were filled back in because of water stagnation in them. Lines are crossed by three parallel avenues (prospekts), roughly, from east to west.

Each side (embankment) of each canal got a name of its own, mostly in the digital form.

== Numerical designations and verbal names ==
In the strict sense of the word, lines in the grid are not streets themselves, but sides of the streets. These have peculiar designations.

=== Numbers of lines ===
Most of them have numbers instead of verbal names, and one line is a side of a street, not the whole street. Different names/numbers of different sides of the same street are similar to different names of the central city river - the Neva - embankments.

The easternmost "lined" street has sides called, respectively, Kadetskaya liniya (Cadets' Line) on the east and 1-я (1st, Первая - First) on the west. The next parallel street is designated as 2nd and 3rd street and so on, the last, westernmost one, being a shorter street named/numbered 28th-29th Lines.

==== History of Cadets' Line name ====
Kadetskaya liniya (Cadets' Line) was given its name after the 18th century military academy (Rus. Первый Кадетский корпус (Perviy Kadetskiy korpus 1st Cadets' Corps)). The academy was located at the beginning of the street in the land originally granted by Peter the Great to his powerful courtier Alexander Menshikov. The academy was granted the plot including the Menshikov Palace after Menshikov's fall from power.

For the greater part of the 20th century the described side of the street had a different, yet related name until it was changed back in the 21st century. It was called Syezdovskaya liniya (Съездовская линия Congress Line) after the fateful interrevolutionary 1917 Congress of Workers' and Peasants' Councils (Rus. Soviets) held on the premises of the academy, at which, after a Menshevik politician Irakli Tsereteli's statement in his public address that at that moment in Russia there was no political party that could and would take the sole responsibility for the country (i.e., become the ruling party on its own), Vladimir Lenin, the leader of Bolsheviks, said that there was such a party, namely his own one. On 25 October (Old Style) 1917, the Bolshevik faction of the Russian Socialist Democratic Labor Party took power in Russia, and the famous congress and remark were to be commemorated.

Images of Kadetskaya liniya
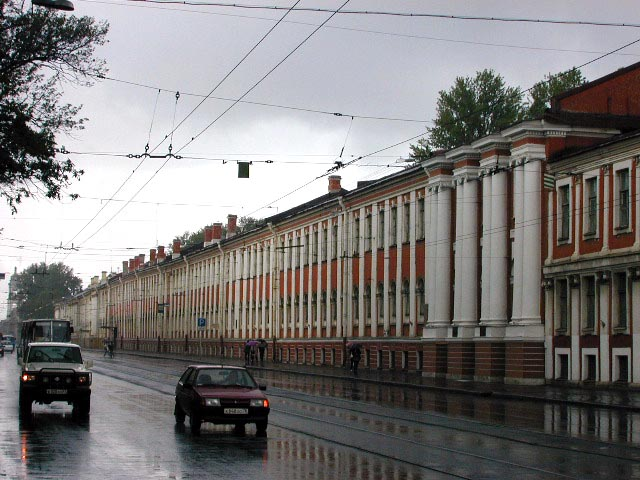

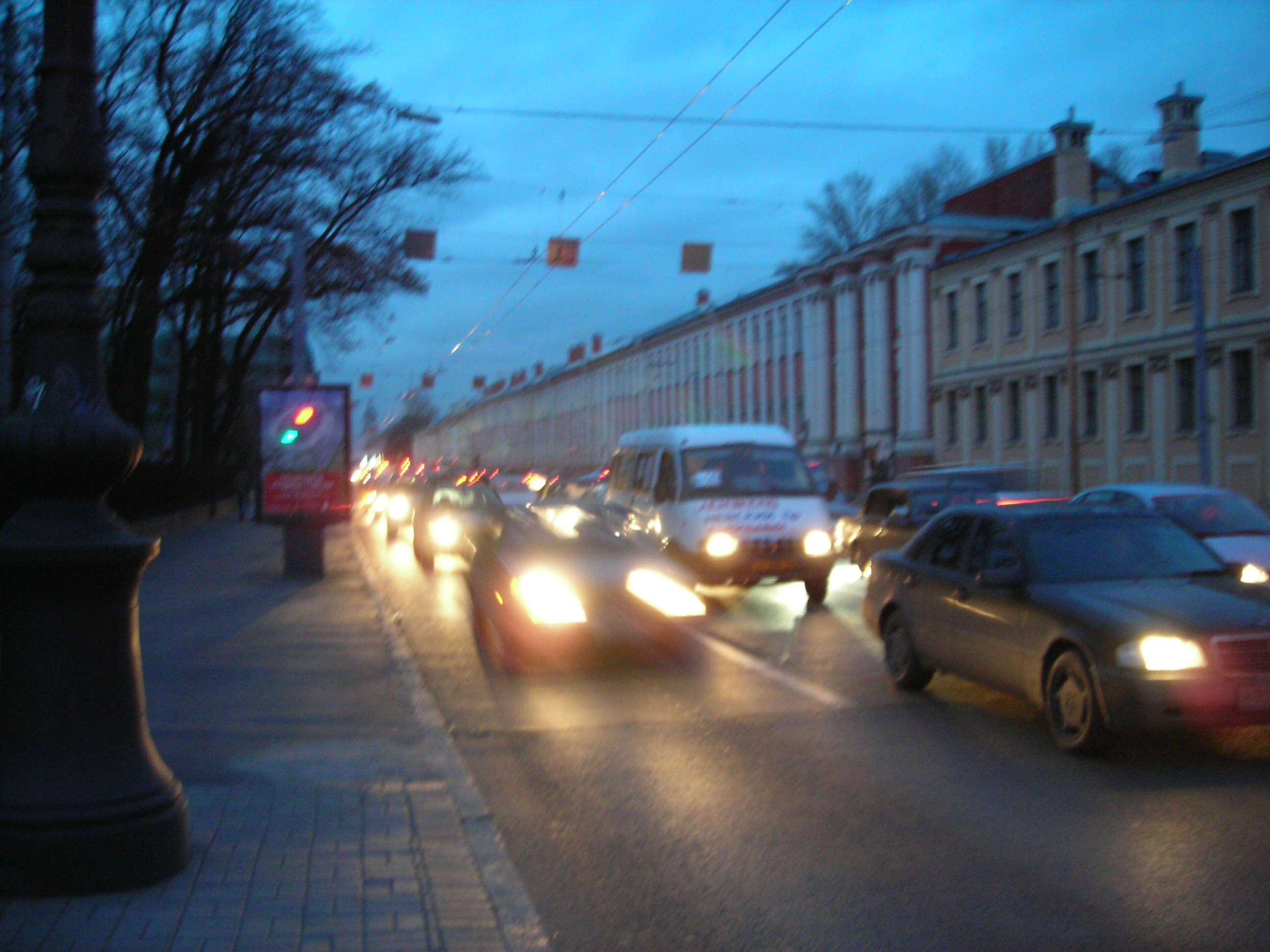

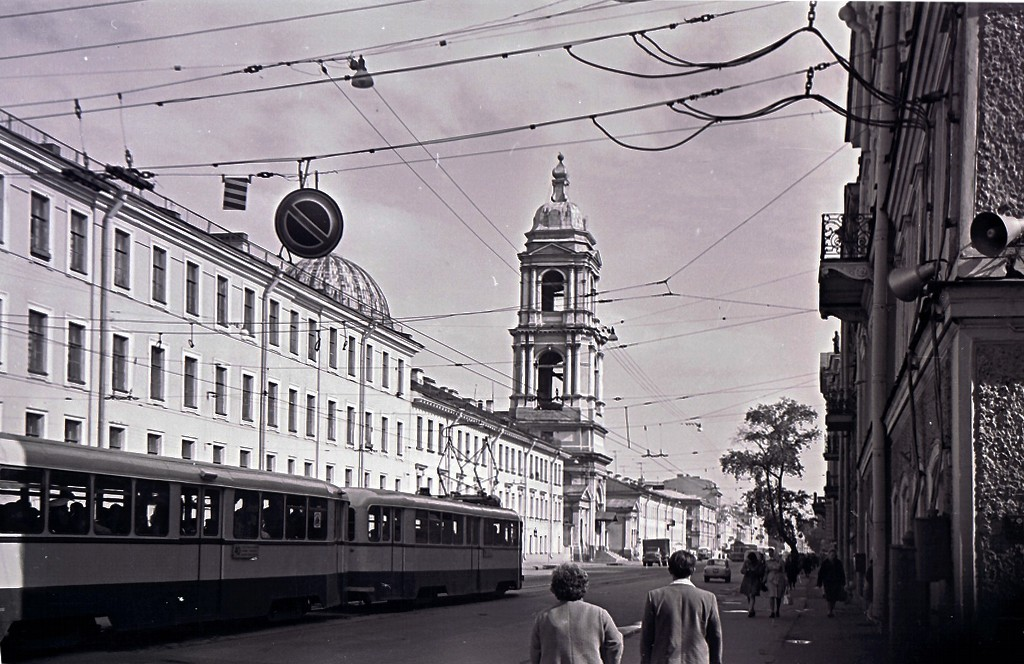

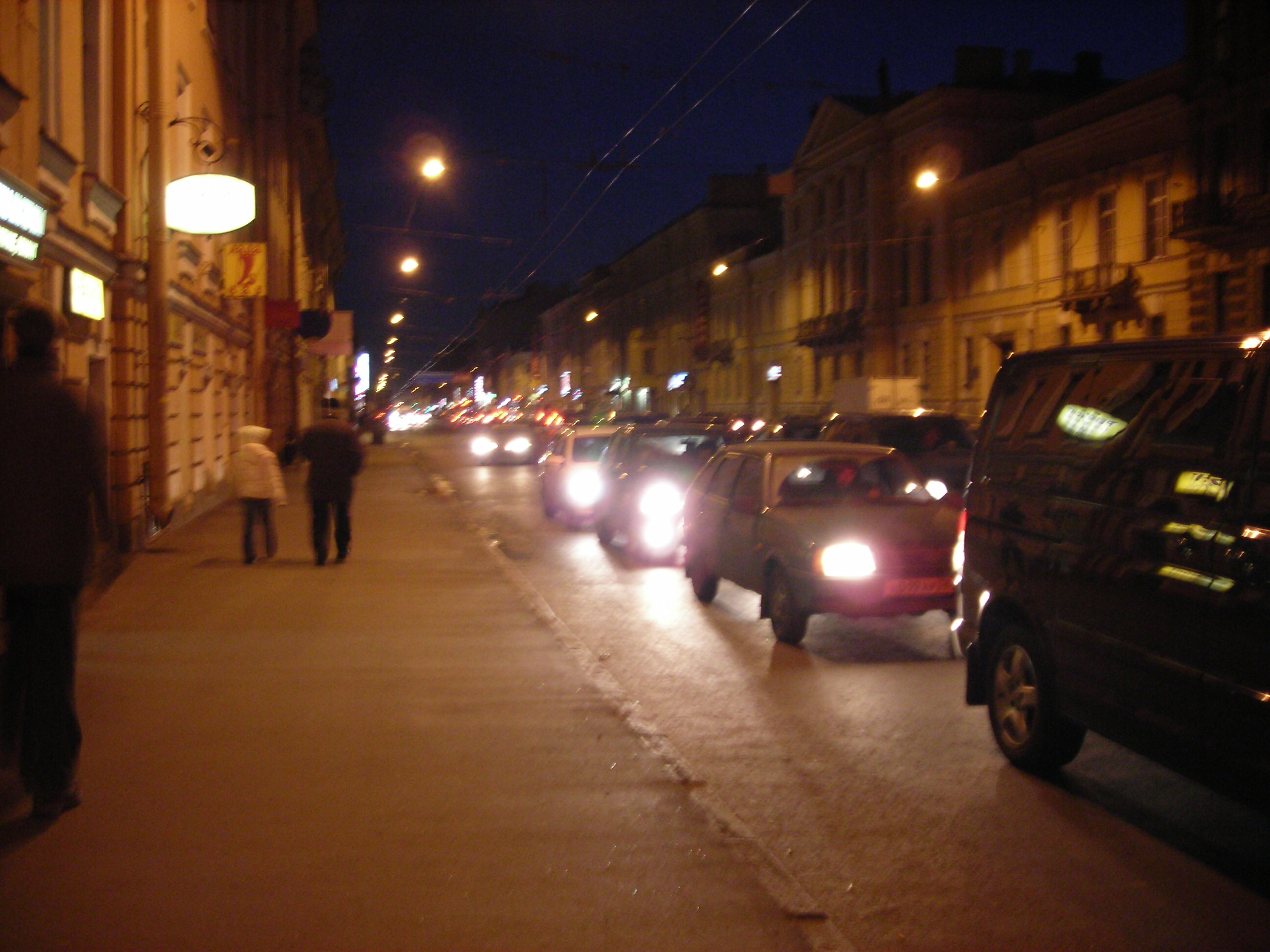

=== Verbal exceptions ===
==== Slant Line and Tanners' Line ====
In the south-western, still industrial, part of the island (beginning to be redeveloped) there is Line that does not follow the rest of the list either in its direction or in its name. It is Kosaya liniya (Rus. Косая линия "Slant Line"). It has one name for both its sides and goes "slantwise", dividing at the crossroads the right angle between Bolshoy Prospekt and 22nd–23rd Line(s).

Images of Kosaya liniya
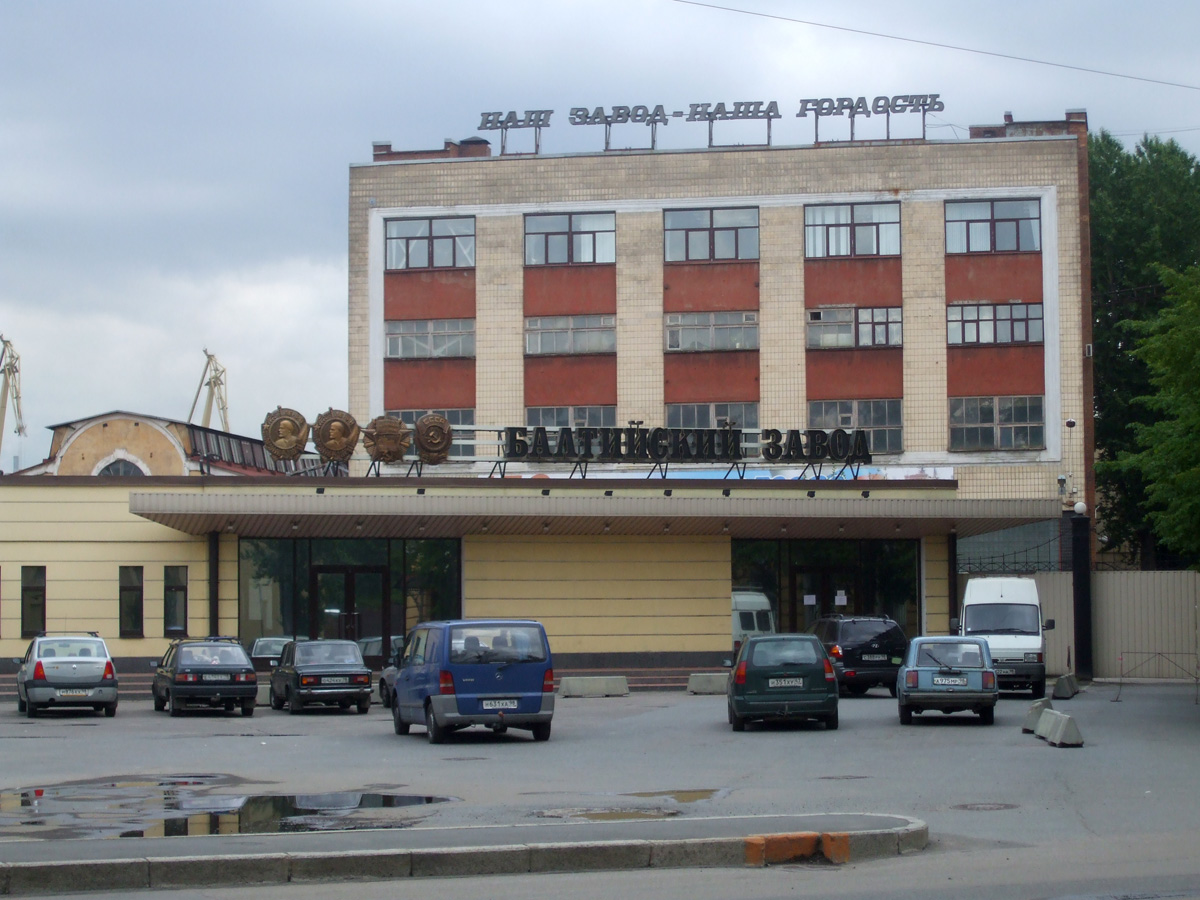

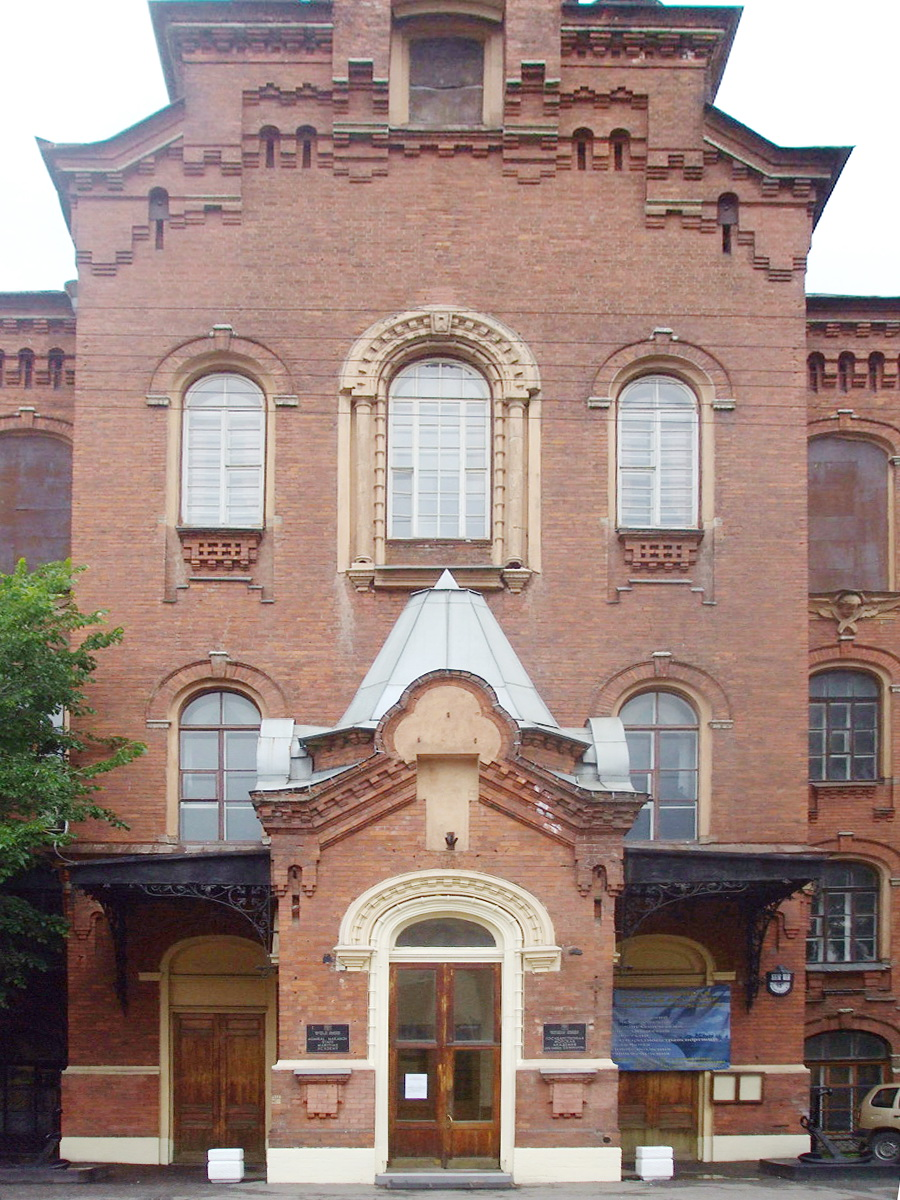

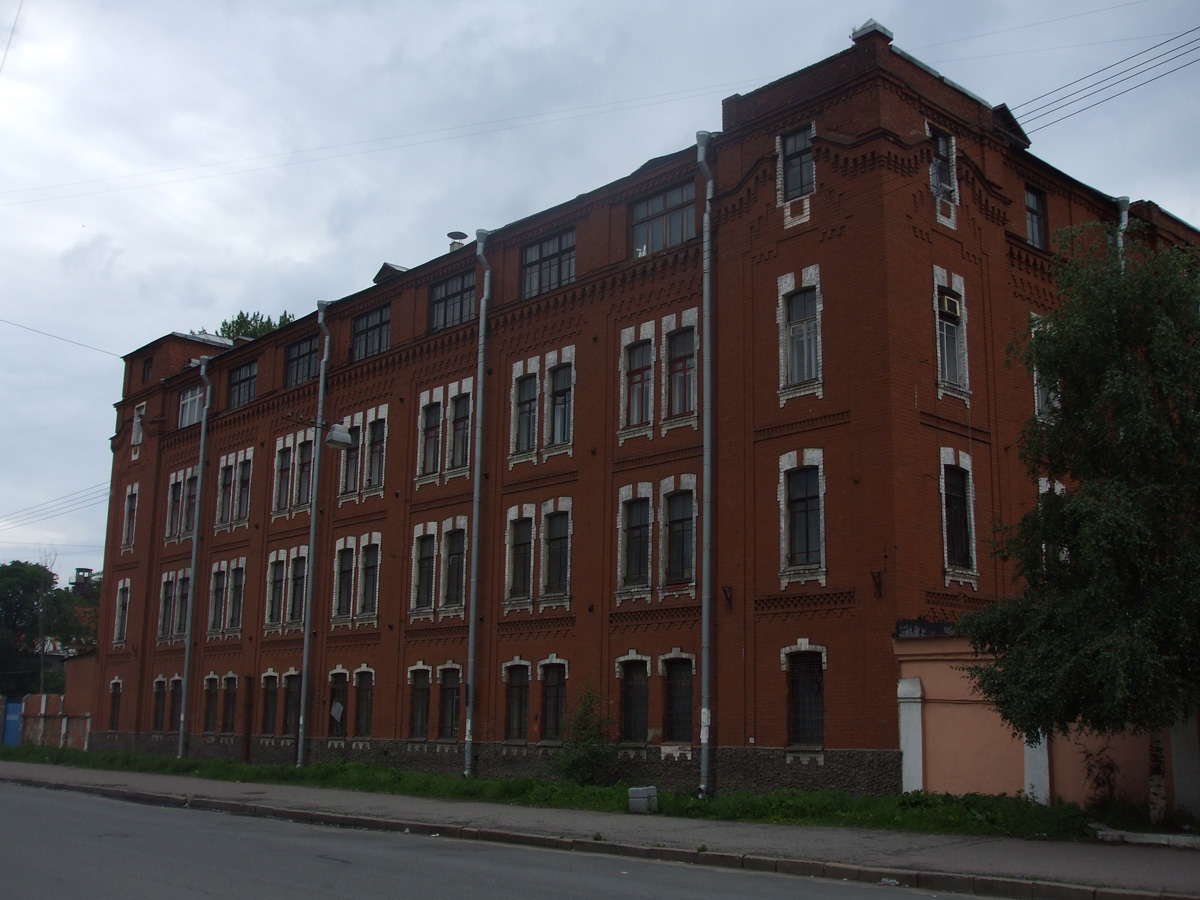

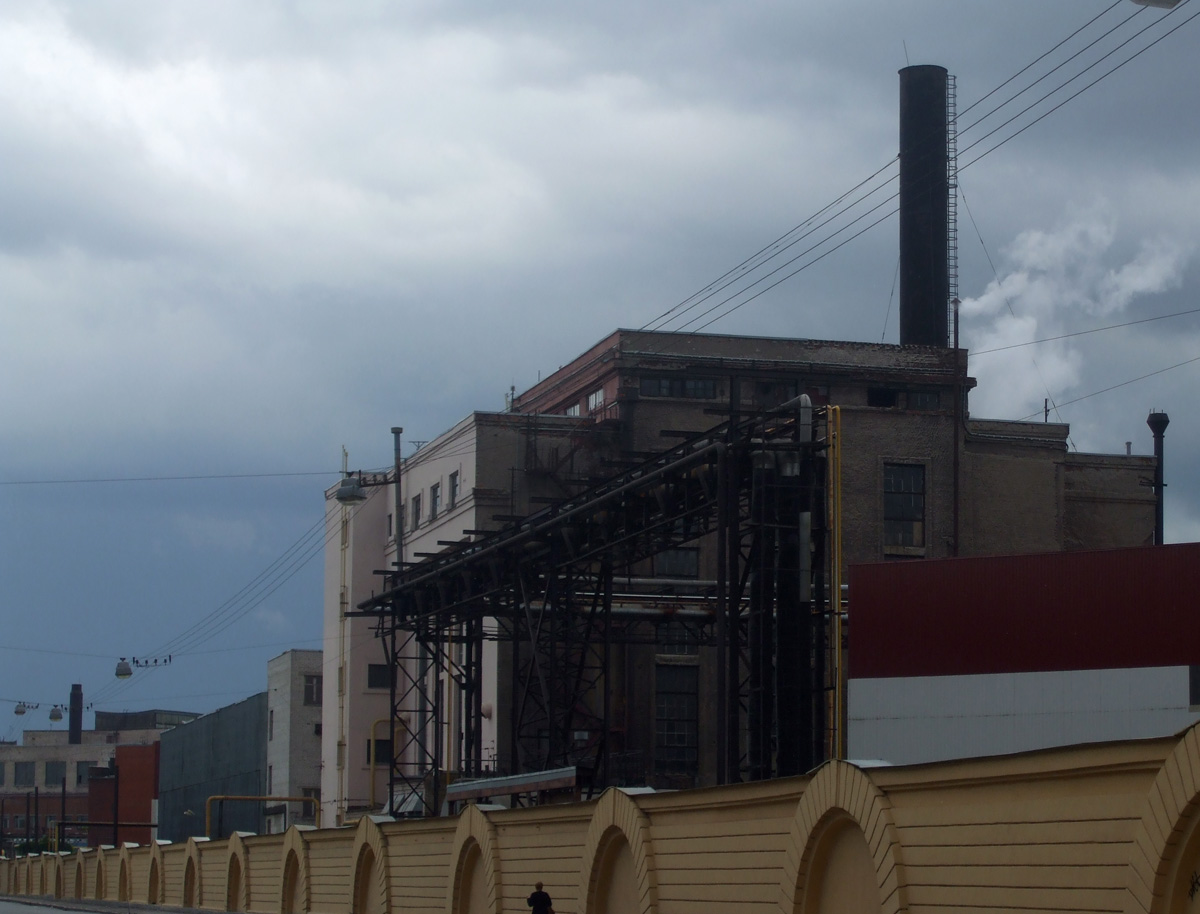

The only other example of verbal designation of a "line" street in that factory-packed part of the island is Kozhevennaya liniya (Tanners' or Leather Line), whose name is a tribute to a formerly considerable branch of local industry.

Images of Kozhevennaya liniya
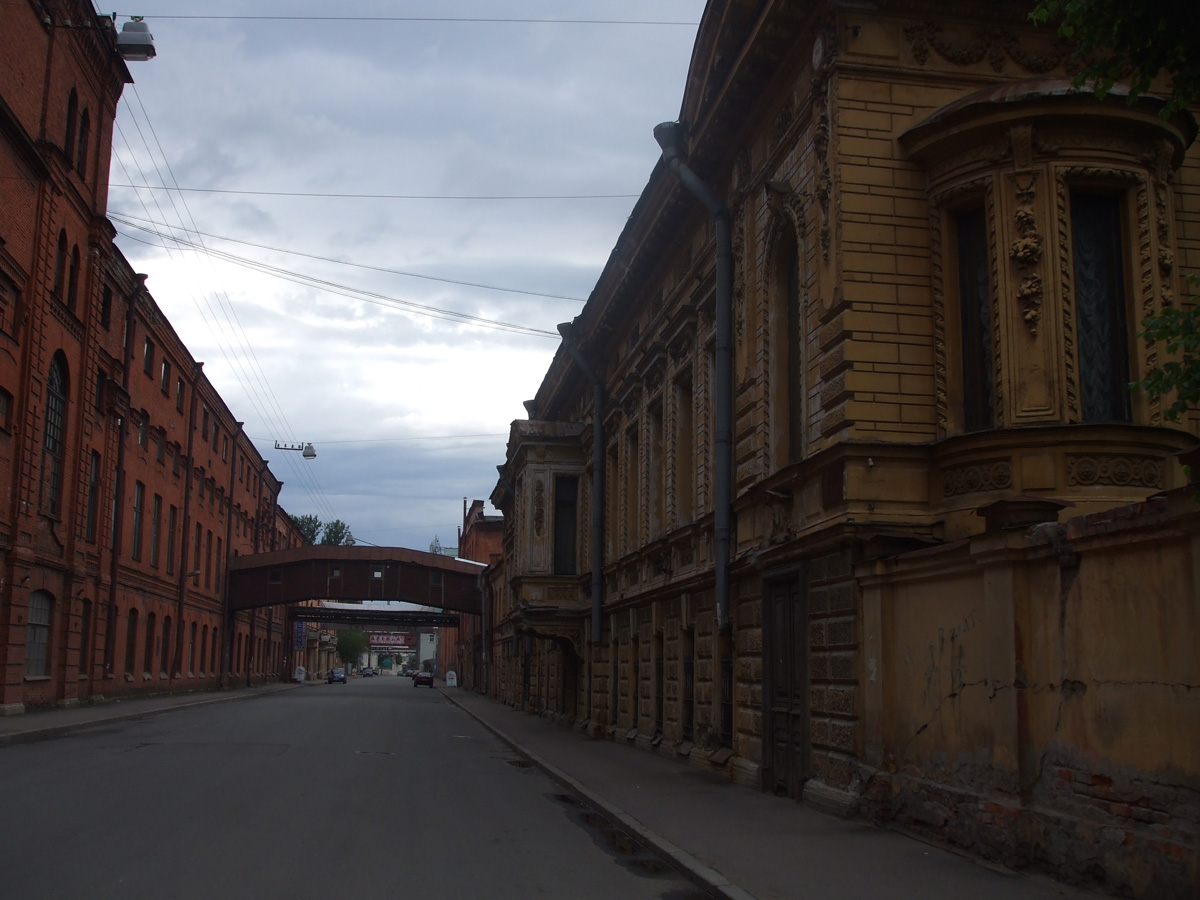

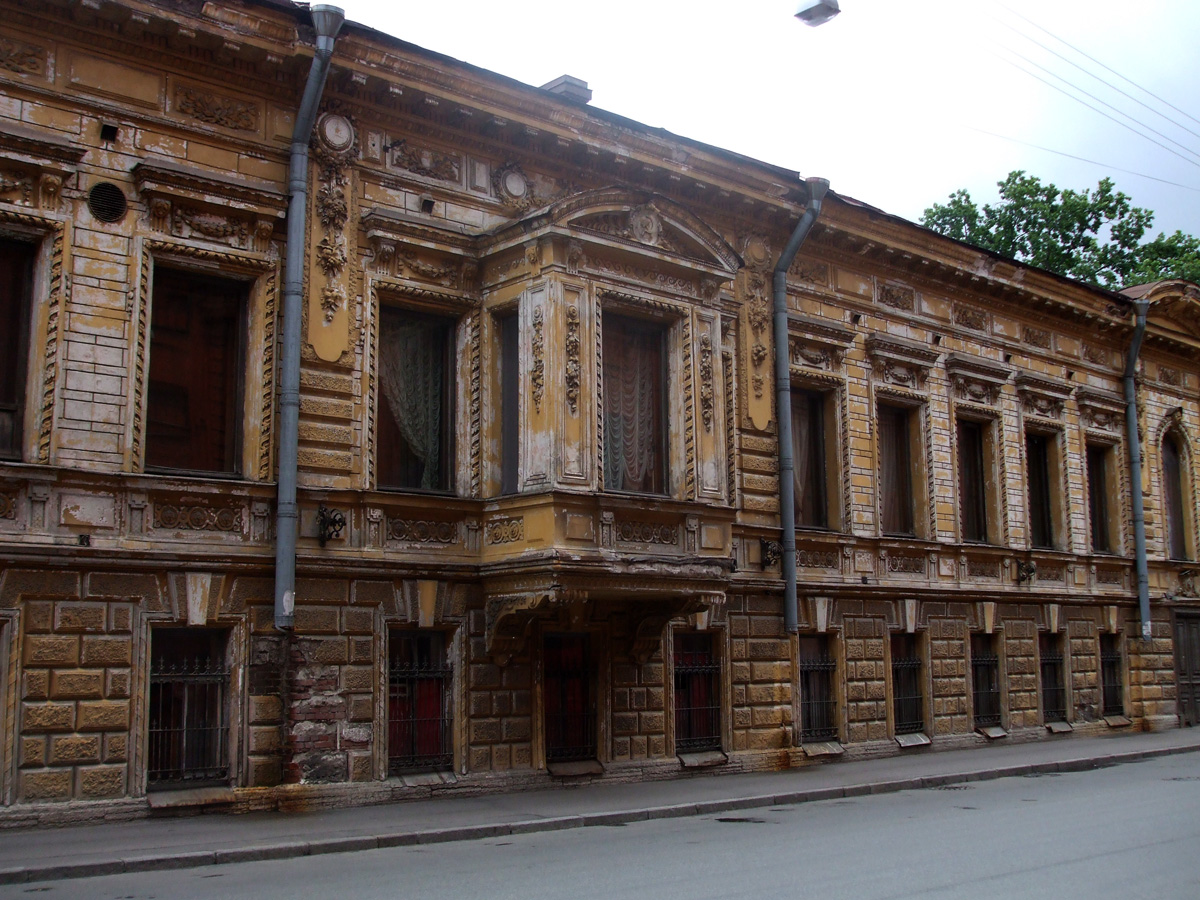

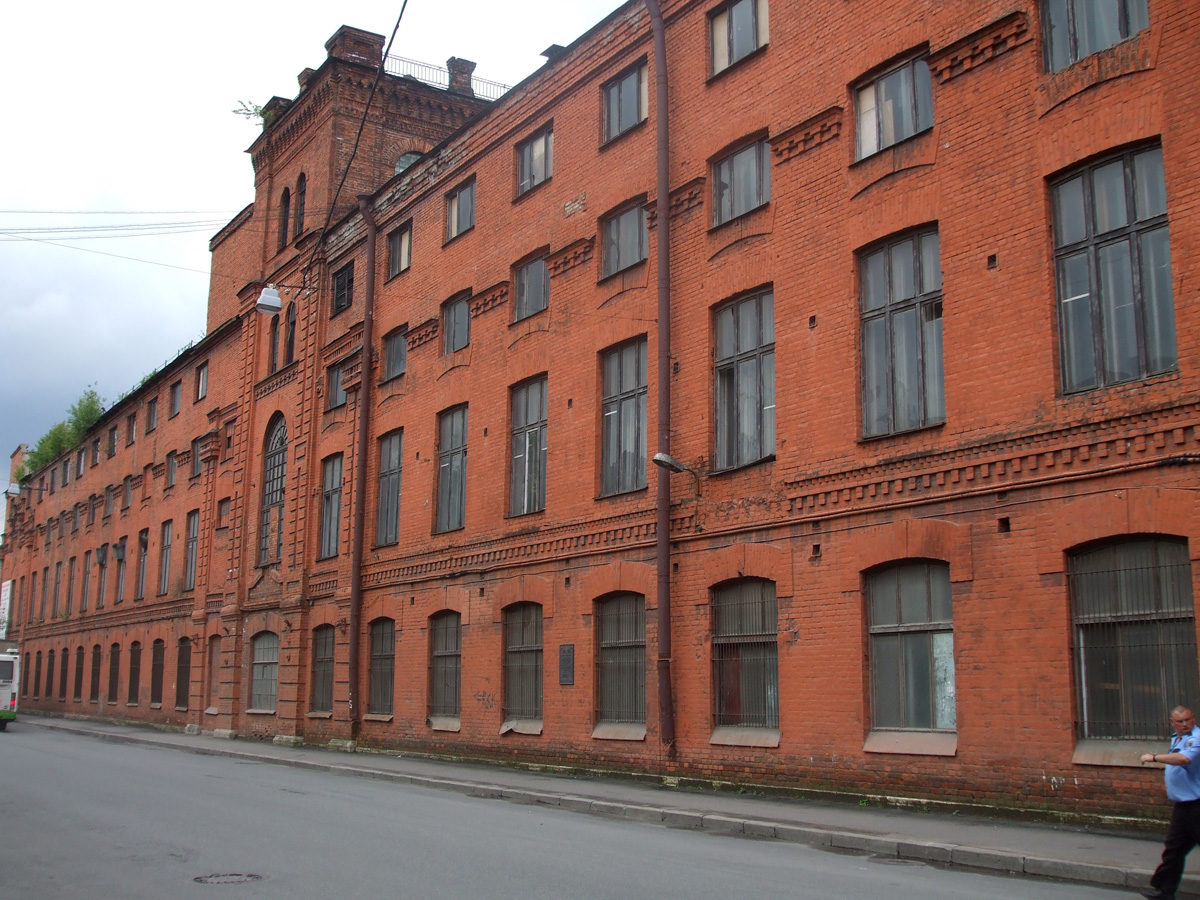

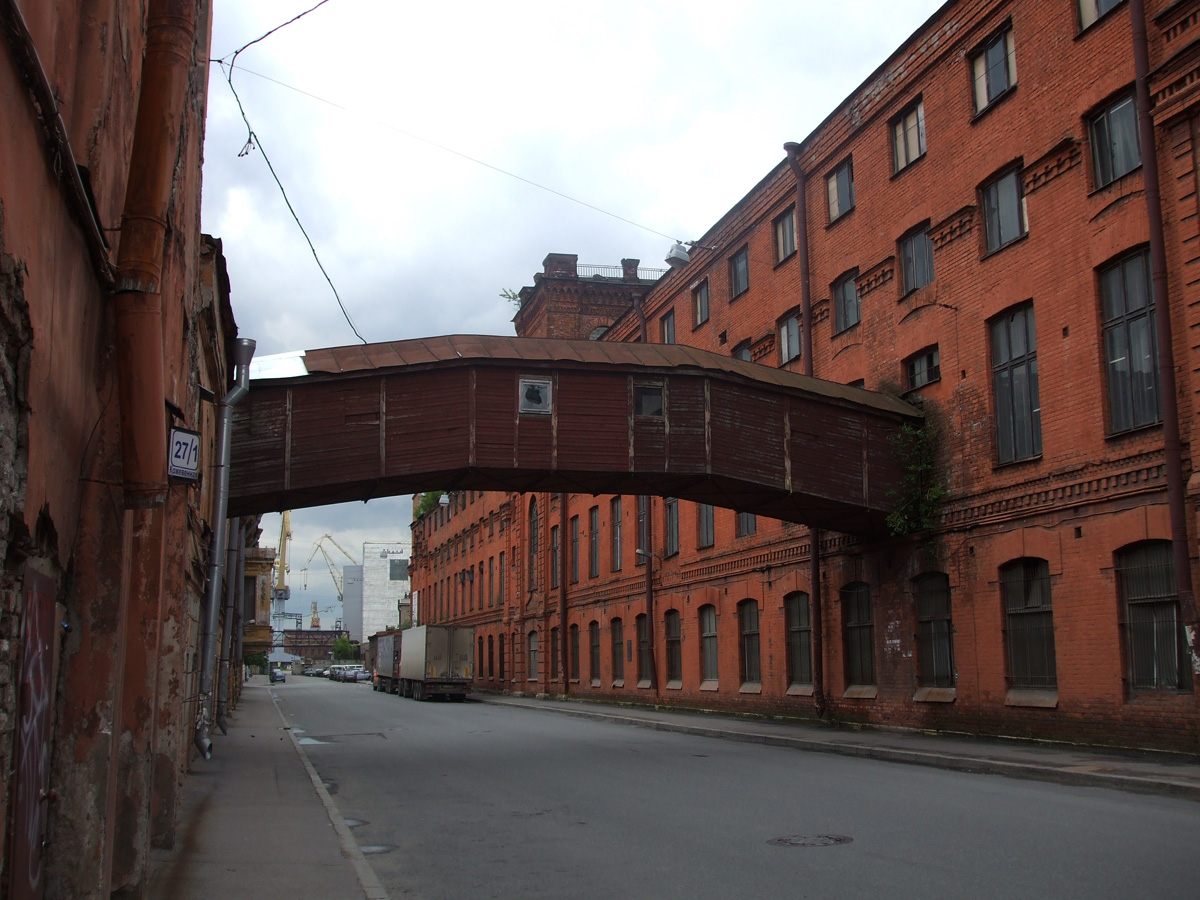

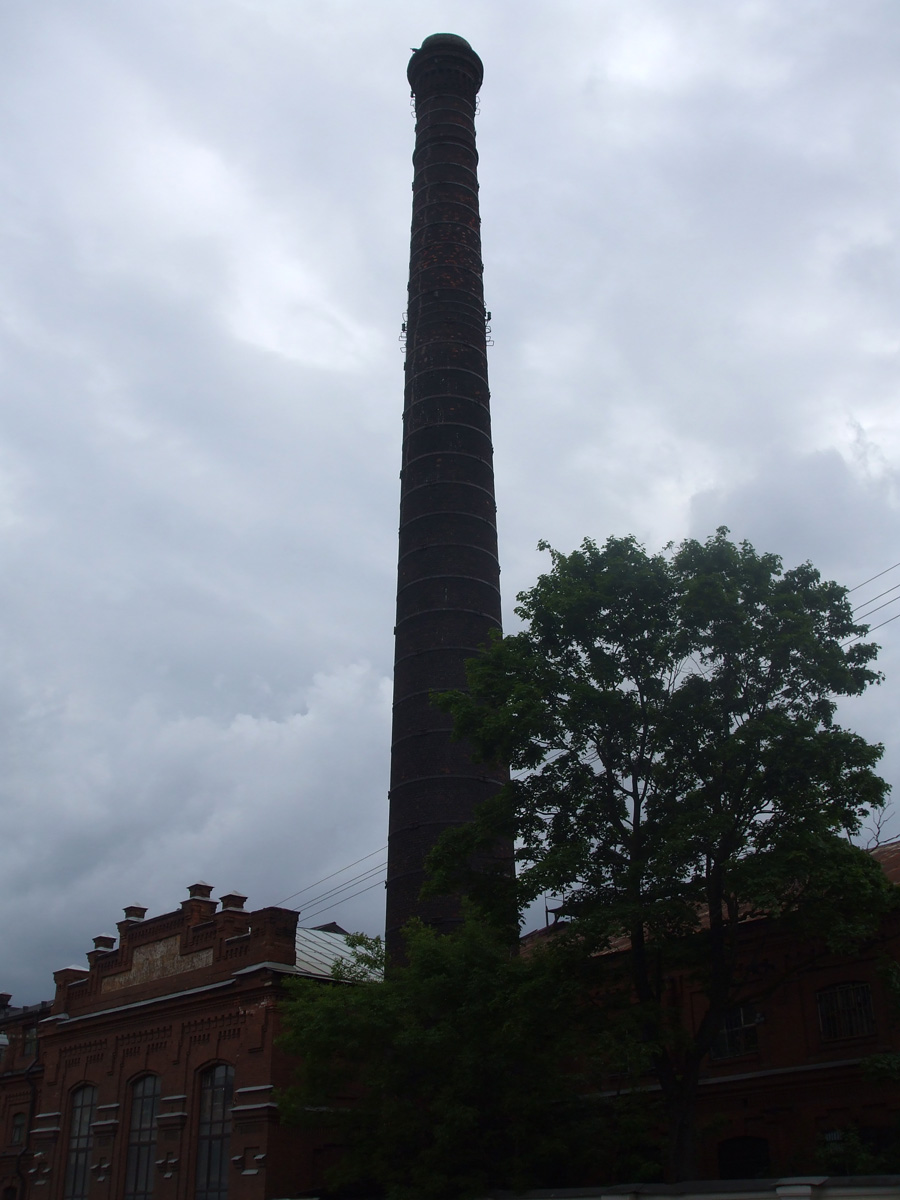

==== Mendeleyev/Mendeleev Line and Stock Exchange Line ====
At the other end of the island, near its famous east end, full of scientific and museum institutions, there are two other verbally named line streets which run nearly coaxially to each other.

On the one starting from University Embankment (Universitetskaya Embankment) looks the front of the Twelve Collegia Petrine Baroque that now houses Saint Petersburg State University. In 19th and early 20th century the building, belonging to Russia's Head Institute of Education (Rus. Главный педагогический институт) contained the office and living premises of one of its most famous professors - the chemist Dmitry Mendeleyev, and the street was later called after him Mendeleyevskaya liniya (Mendeleyev Line). The Twelve Collegia building now is home to Mendeleyev Memorial Apartment Museum.

At the end of that longish edifice the street flows into a square completely surrounded by places of learning: the main building of the university with its Head Office and Biology and Soil School, another building with its History and Philosophy Schools, yet another one with the celebrated Library of the Russian Academy of Sciences, and the State Optics Institute. These form what is now known as Andrei Sakharov Square, from which the passage along to the opposite embankment continues a little to the left and is known as Birzhevaya liniya (Биржевая линия, Stock Exchange Line) after the Old Saint Petersburg Stock Exchange, whose historic building (recently vacated by the Russian Central Naval Museum) is located just a little to the east.

Images of Mendeleyevskaya liniya
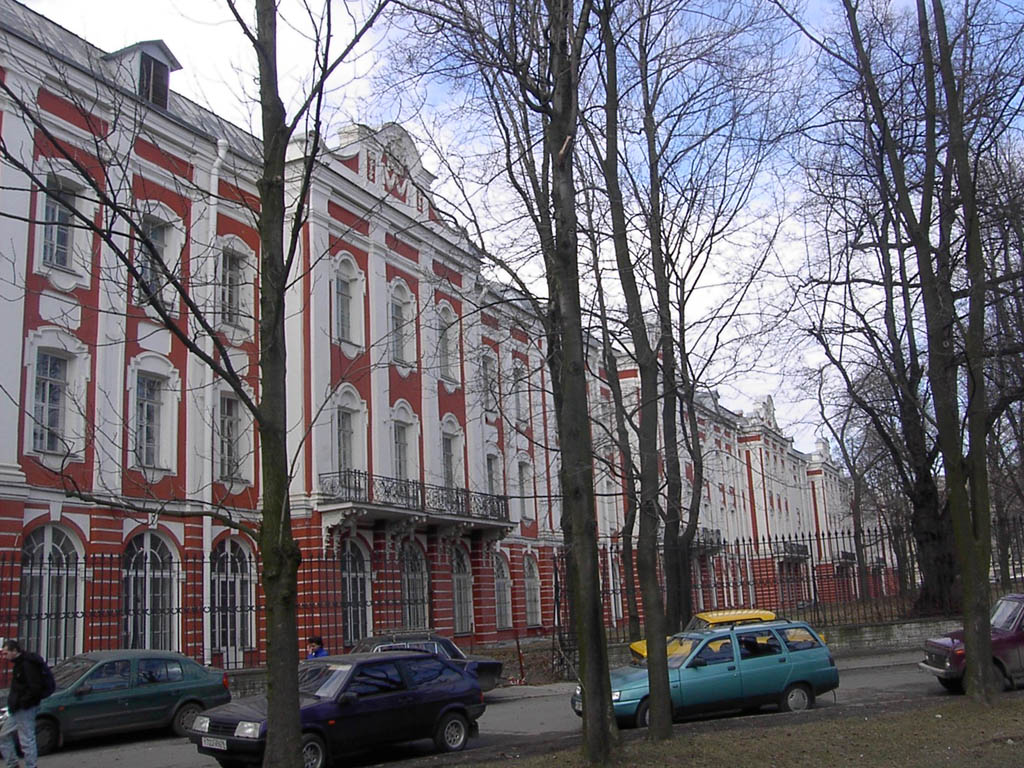

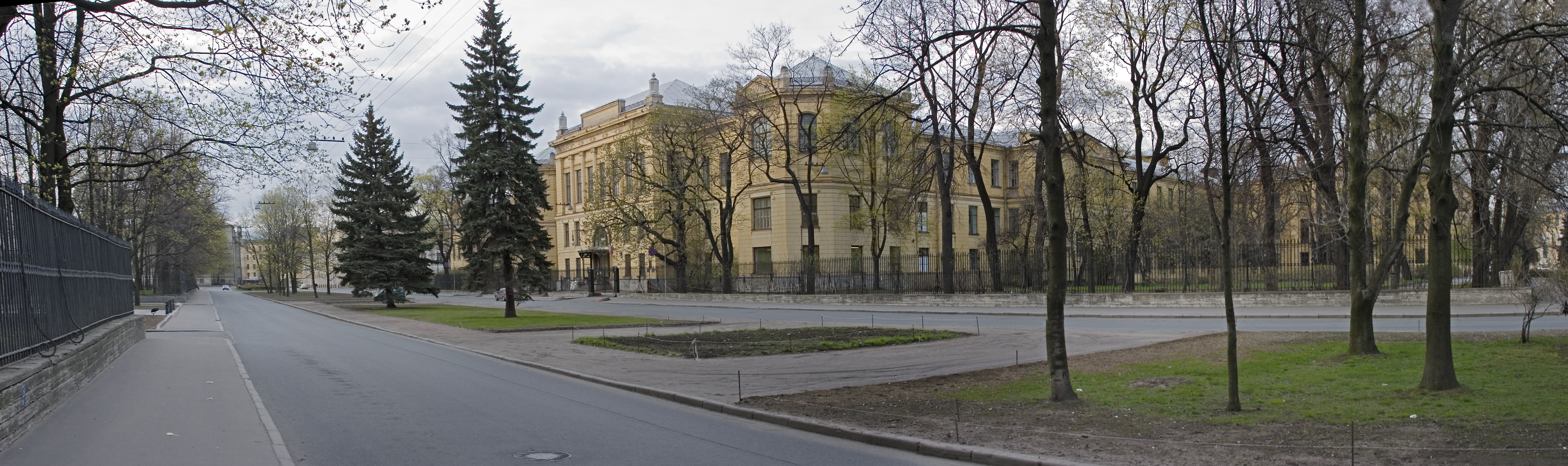

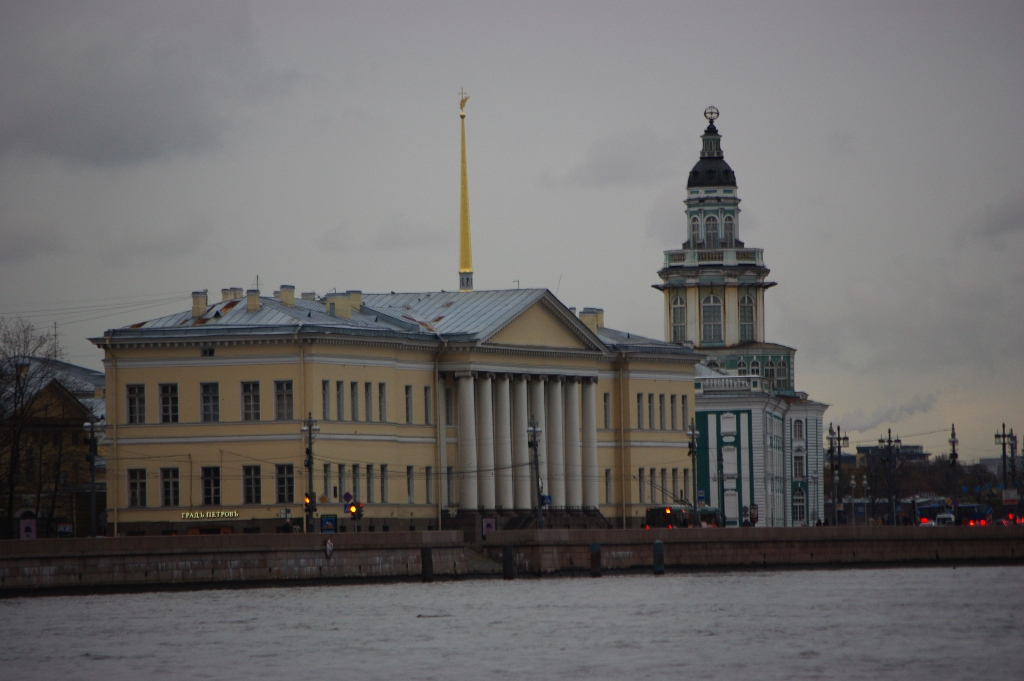

== Influence ==
The lines of Vasilyevsky Island influenced the names of the five numbered lines (Estonian: liin) on Kopli peninsula in Tallinn. The neighbourhood was subsequently named "Kopli lines" (Kopli liinid) and another street, Liinivahe ("Between-the-Lines"), was named in 2009.

== See also ==
- The Island on Wikimapia
