= Konstantinovo, Russia =

Konstantinovo (Russian: Константиново) is the name of several rural localities in Russia.

== Arkhangelsk Oblast ==
As of 2010, one rural locality in Arkhangelsk Oblast bears this name:

- Konstantinovo, Arkhangelsk Oblast, a village in Verkhneuftyugsky Selsoviet of Krasnoborsky District

== Ivanovo Oblast ==
As of 2010, one rural locality in Ivanovo Oblast bears this name:

- Konstantinovo, Ivanovo Oblast, a village in Ilyinsky District

== Kaluga Oblast ==
As of 2010, one rural locality in Kaluga Oblast bears this name:

- Konstantinovo, Kaluga Oblast, a village in Maloyaroslavetsky District

== Kostroma Oblast ==
As of 2010, two rural localities in Kostroma Oblast bear this name:

- Konstantinovo, Chukhlomsky District, Kostroma Oblast, a village in Sudayskoye Settlement of Chukhlomsky District
- Konstantinovo, Kostromskoy District, Kostroma Oblast, a village in Kuzmishchenskoye Settlement of Kostromskoy District

== Moscow Oblast ==
As of 2010, five rural localities in Moscow Oblast bear this name:

- Konstantinovo, Domodedovo, Moscow Oblast, a selo under the administrative jurisdiction of Domodedovo Town Under Oblast Jurisdiction
- Konstantinovo, Ramensky District, Moscow Oblast, a selo in Konstantinovskoye Rural Settlement of Ramensky District
- Konstantinovo, Ruzsky District, Moscow Oblast, a village in Staroruzskoye Rural Settlement of Ruzsky District
- Konstantinovo, Sergiyevo-Posadsky District, Moscow Oblast, a selo in Shemetovskoye Rural Settlement of Sergiyevo-Posadsky District
- Konstantinovo, Voskresensky District, Moscow Oblast, a selo in Fedinskoye Rural Settlement of Voskresensky District

== Ryazan Oblast ==
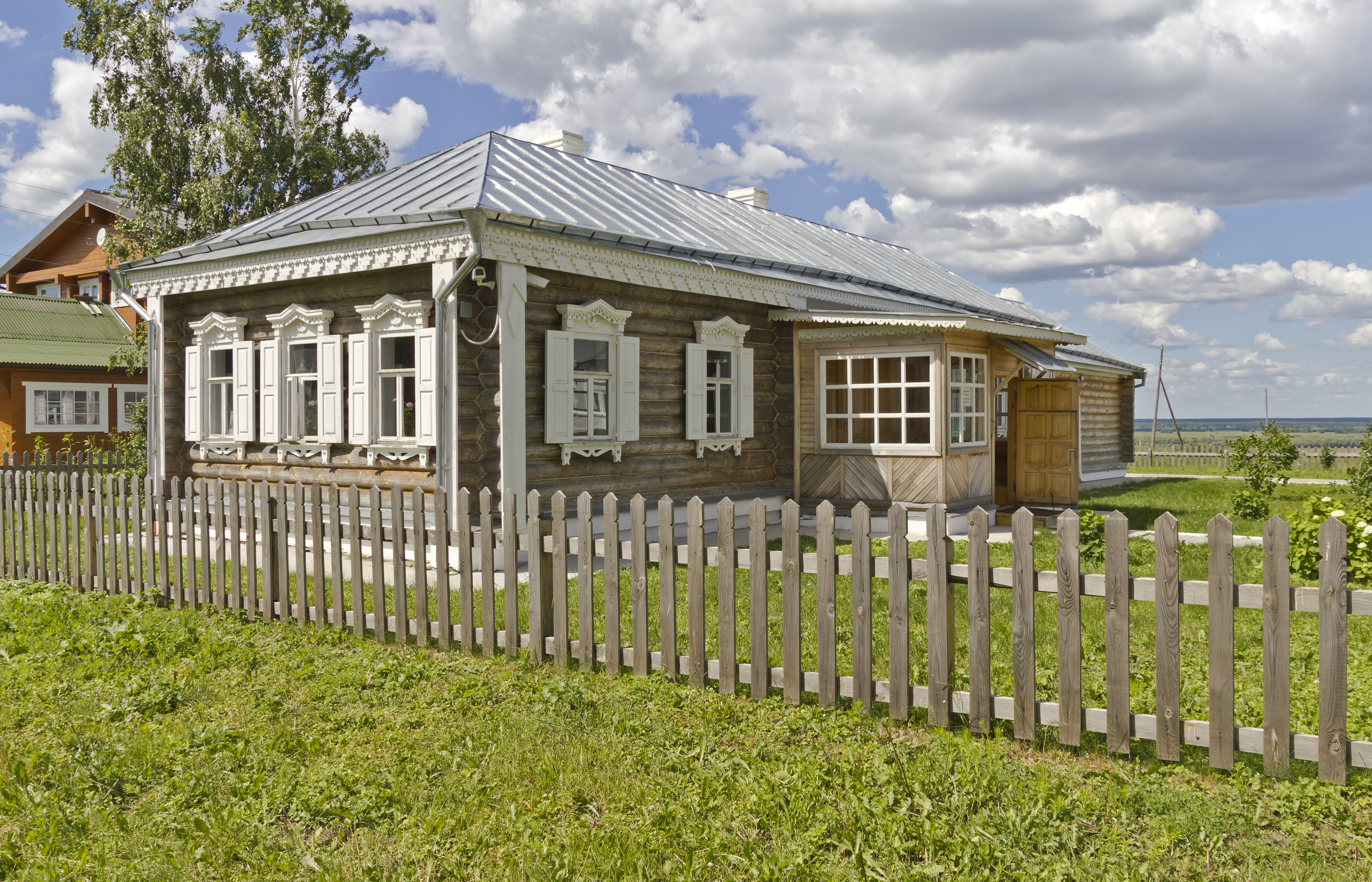
The former vicarage in Konstantinovo, Rybnovsky District

As of 2010, three rural localities in Ryazan Oblast bear this name:

- Konstantinovo, Klepikovsky District, Ryazan Oblast, a selo in Davydovsky Rural Okrug of Klepikovsky District
- Konstantinovo, Rybnovsky District, Ryazan Oblast, a selo in Kuzminsky Rural Okrug of Rybnovsky District
- Konstantinovo, Shilovsky District, Ryazan Oblast, a selo in Pustopolsky Rural Okrug of Shilovsky District

== Tver Oblast ==
As of 2010, seven rural localities in Tver Oblast bear this name:

- Konstantinovo, Bezhetsky District, Tver Oblast, a selo in Shishkovskoye Rural Settlement of Bezhetsky District
- Konstantinovo, Kashinsky District, Tver Oblast, a village in Pestrikovskoye Rural Settlement of Kashinsky District
- Konstantinovo, Krasnovskoye Rural Settlement, Kimrsky District, Tver Oblast, a village in Krasnovskoye Rural Settlement of Kimrsky District
- Konstantinovo, Krasnovskoye Rural Settlement, Kimrsky District, Tver Oblast, a village in Krasnovskoye Rural Settlement of Kimrsky District
- Konstantinovo, Likhoslavlsky District, Tver Oblast, a village in Veskinskoye Rural Settlement of Likhoslavlsky District
- Konstantinovo, Rameshkovsky District, Tver Oblast, a village in Nikolskoye Rural Settlement of Rameshkovsky District
- Konstantinovo, Sonkovsky District, Tver Oblast, a village in Grigorkovskoye Rural Settlement of Sonkovsky District

== Vladimir Oblast ==
As of 2010, two rural localities in Vladimir Oblast bear this name:

- Konstantinovo, Gus-Khrustalny District, Vladimir Oblast, a village in Gus-Khrustalny District
- Konstantinovo, Suzdalsky District, Vladimir Oblast, a selo in Suzdalsky District

== Vologda Oblast ==
As of 2010, two rural localities in Vologda Oblast bear this name:

- Konstantinovo, Gryazovetsky District, Vologda Oblast, a village in Lezhsky Selsoviet of Gryazovetsky District
- Konstantinovo, Vologodsky District, Vologda Oblast, a village in Votchinsky Selsoviet of Vologodsky District

== Yaroslavl Oblast ==
As of 2010, three rural localities in Yaroslavl Oblast bear this name:

- Konstantinovo, Gavrilov-Yamsky District, Yaroslavl Oblast, a village in Stavotinsky Rural Okrug of Gavrilov-Yamsky District
- Konstantinovo, Tutayevsky District, Yaroslavl Oblast, a village in Chebakovsky Rural Okrug of Tutayevsky District
- Konstantinovo, Uglichsky District, Yaroslavl Oblast, a village in Vozdvizhensky Rural Okrug of Uglichsky District
