= Ego-Futurism =

Russian literary movement of the 1910s

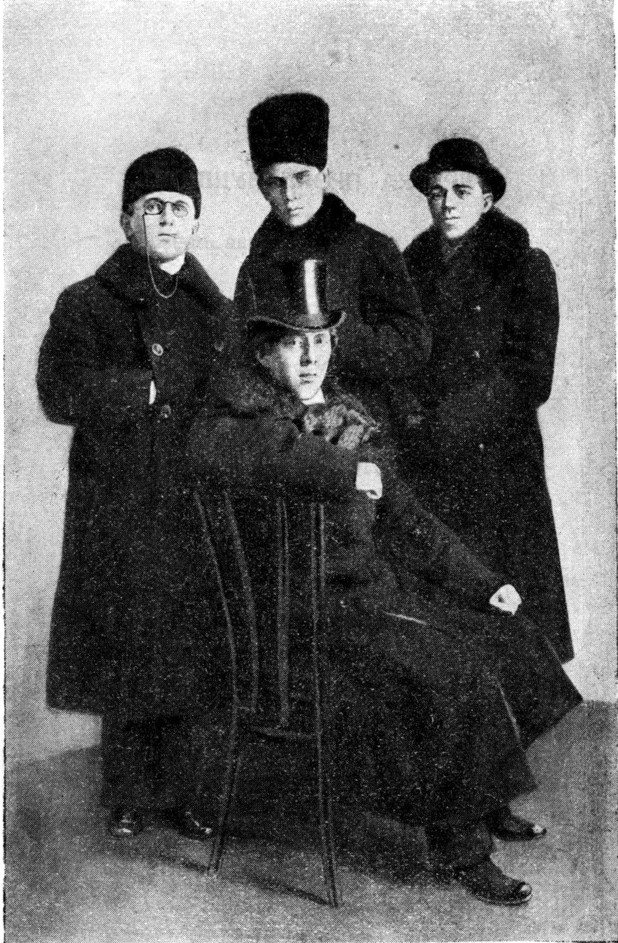
Association of Ego-Futurism areopagus, during its second phase. Seated: Ivan Ignatiev. Standing: Dmitri Kryuchkov, Vasilisk Gnedov, and Pavel Shirokov.

Ego-Futurism was a Russian literary movement of the 1910s, developed within Russian Futurism by Igor Severyanin and his early followers. While part of the Russian Futurism movement, it was distinguished from the Moscow-based cubo-futurists as it was associated with poets and artists active in Saint Petersburg.

== Background ==
In 1909, the Italian poet Filippo Tommaso Marinetti began the Futurist movement by publishing the Manifesto of Futurism; it called for a total break with the past, in favour of a completely modern world. Very quickly he gained numerous followers, such as the painter Umberto Boccioni, and the musician Luigi Russolo. In 1910, Marinetti went to Russia to lecture on his ideas; it was this year that one of the earliest Russian Futurist groups began: led by David and Wladimir Burliuk, it was called 'Hylea', and its members included poets who would later become Cubo-Futurists, the rivals of the Ego-Futurists.

Igor Severyanin, the founder of Ego-Futurism, was already a poet, writing under the influence of two Russian Impressionist poets, Konstantin Fofanov and Mirra Lokhvitskaya. His Futurist ideas were developing in 1910, and by the next year he was ready.

== History ==
=== Early years ===
Ego-Futurism was born in either the summer of or in November that year, when Severyanin published a small brochure titled Prolog (Ego-Futurism). The first Ego-Futurist publication, it insulted contemporary verse, declared that poetry would soon have to undergo a complete transformation to suit modernity, and claimed that he himself was already famous throughout Russia. Although a group of four Ego-Futurist poets calling themselves the 'Ego-group' had already been formed that October, they only issued their manifesto after Prolog was published, and began their activities in January the following year.

The four original members – Severyanin, Konstantin Olimpov (Fofanov's son), Georgy Ivanov, and Graal Arelsky – then issued a manifesto illustrating their intentions, now calling themselves the 'Academy of Ego-Poetry'. The group began to hold loud public events to gain publicity, but little information is available related to these. The ideology of Ego-Futurism has been described as founded on a personality cult and the poet's abhorrence of the crowd.

In November 1912, after an argument with Olimpov and a new member, the poet Ivan Ignatiev, Severyanin officially left the group; nonetheless, he still identified himself as an Ego-Futurist, and continued to publish in their almanacs. Ignatiev took charge of the group, and in the January 1913 manifesto signed by himself and several new members, he renamed the academy to its present name. One of the most notable poets from the second phase of Ego-Futurism was Vasilisk Gnedov; in 1913, he would publish a book of poems, where the quantities of words used would diminish, and end with the phrase The Poem of the End printed on an otherwise-blank page. He was stylistically the closest to the Cubo-Futurists.

=== Peak of influence ===
By 1913, groups inspired by Ego-Futurism began to appear, for example the 'Mezzanine of Poetry', a group founded by Vadim Shershenevich. It was dissolved by 1914, and Shershenevich joined the Cubo-Futurists.

From the beginning, there were several differences between the Cubo-Futurism and Ego-Futurism; for example, in their almanacs, they published Symbolist poetry alongside their own, whilst the Cubo-Futurist poets completely rejected the past, going so far as to declare that famous authors, for example Fyodor Dostoevsky, had to be "pushed off the steamboat of modernity" immediately. Severyanin also decried excessive objectivity of the Cubo-Futurists, advocating a more subjective attitude. Although other Russian Futurists dismissed the Ego-Futurists as puerile and vulgar, Severyanin argued that his advancement of outspoken sensuality, neologisms and ostentatious selfishness qualifies as futurism.

Despite their differences, the group briefly united in 1914; unfortunately for the project, Shershenevich was involved, and he took advantage of a group tour to publish, in the group journal, an attack against the Ego-Futurists and a Moscow Futurist group, 'Centrifuge'. Boris Pasternak, a member of Centrifuge, retorted with a satirical article against him, leading to a verbal battle between certain members of the groups for recognition as the first, truest Futurists.

In 1913–14, the Cubo-Futurist poets Vladimir Mayakovsky, Vasilly Kamensky, and David Burliuk decided to tour Russia with poetry recitals. Severyanin occasionally joined in, but it was during this time that the collaboration ended, due to an argument with Burliuk and Mayakovsky.

=== Decline ===
The movement had begun to fall apart when Severyanin officially abandoned the group to begin his solo career in 1912, and was finished by 1916.

== Legacy ==
The Ego-Futurists significantly influenced the Imaginists of the 1920s.

== Poets related to Ego-Futurism ==
- Sergey Alymov
- Graal Arelsky
- Vadim Bayan
- Vasilisk Gnedov
- Boris Gusman
- Georgy Ivanov
- Ivan Ignatiev
- Pavel Kokorin
- Ivan Lukash
- Igor Severyanin
- Peter Larionov
- Dmitri Kryuchkov
- Konstantin Olimpov
- Rurik Ivnev
- Vadim Shershenevich
- Georgy Shengeli
- Pavel Shirokov
- Lev Zak

== See also ==
- Velimir Khlebnikov
- Zaum
- Zangesi
- Cubo-Futurism
- Futurism
- Dada
