= Pavel Shirokov =

Russian poet

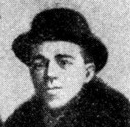
P. D. Shirokov

Pavel Dmitrievich Shirokov (1893–1963) (Russian: Павел Дмитриевич Широков) was a poet of Ego-Futurism in Russia in the 1910s. He was a close friend of Ivan Ignatyev, who published Shirokov's first book entitled "Rozy v Vine" (Roses in Wine). Neologisms and French words occur frequently in Shirokov's works; he refers to his verses using French terms such as triolets, virelais, romances, etc., a characteristic possibly derived from fellow Ego-Futurist Igor Severyanin. In January 1913 another book of poems was published, entitled "V i Vne" (Inside and Outside), described by critic Vladimir Markov as "much less successful and, strangely enough, less futuristic." Pavel Shirokov later participated in publications of the Moscow Futurists (Mezzanine of Poetry and Centrifuge), though never published any more books, and faded into obscurity.
