= Vadim Shershenevich =

Russian poet

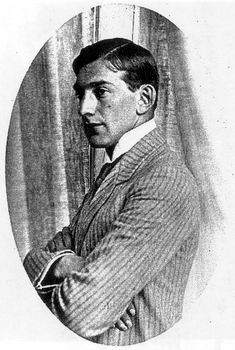
Vadim Shershenevich in the 1920s.

Vadim Gabrielevich Shershenevich (Russian: Вадим Габриэлевич Шершеневич; 25 January 1893 – 18 May 1942) was a Russian poet. He was highly prolific, working in more than one genre, moving from Symbolism to Futurism after meeting Marinetti in Moscow. Later he pioneered the post-revolutionary avant-garde Imaginist movement, but abandoned it in favour of the theatre.

== Biography and career ==
=== Earlier years ===
Shershenevich was born in Kazan, Russia on 25 January 1893. He was the son of professor of Law Gabriel Feliksovich Shershenevich, a Polish national and a deputy of the first State Duma from the Constitutional Democratic party and the author of its platform. Shershenevich's mother, Yevgeniya L'vovna Mandel'shtam (L'vova), was an opera singer. At age nine he entered secondary school a year early. After moving with his parents to Moscow in 1907 he studied in the private secondary school of L.I. Polivanov—earlier graduates of the school included Valery Bryusov, Andrey Bely and Sergey Solovyov. After secondary school he began studies in the philological department at the Ludwig-Maximilians-Universität München. His studies continued at Moscow University - first in the Department of Law, then in mathematics, in which he took his degree.

Shershenevich began writing poetry while still in secondary school and published his first book at age eighteen. This work was strongly influenced by works of Konstantin Bal'mont. His second book, Carmina reflected his enthusiasm for Alexander Blok. It was praised by Nikolai Gumilev: "Vadim Shershenevich's book makes an excellent impression. The well-polished verse (the rare roughnesses hardly shows itself), the unassuming, but adjusted style, the interesting constructions - all make one glad at [reading] its verses". In the same year Shershenevich turned from Symbolism to Futurism. Together with Léon Zack and Ryurik Ivnev he founded the "Mezzanine of Poetry", a short-living eclectic group partly inspired by the Egofuturists.

Shershenevich edited almanacs produced by the Peterburgskiy Glashatay publishing house and helped prepare almanacs from the Moscow publishing house Mezzanine of Poetry, which he practically headed. Before the end of 1913 he published two additional books of poems. He became the theorist and the propagandist of futurism in Russia: He met F.T. Marinetti in Moscow in 1914 and translated his books and published collections of his own articles. His Declaration About Futurist Theatre (1914) attacked asserted that plays and theater direction of the day suppressed the actor: "Action should dominate the theater, not the word."

By age 21, Shershenevich began to develop the theory of Imaginism. He was quoted as saying: "the skill must be contemporary, otherwise it will not touch." His following book of poetry, Автомобилья поступь (Automobilian Advance) expressed this opinion. It was his most significant in the pre-revolutionary period.

In 1915, he volunteered into the Russian army's motor transport unit and sent to fight briefly in the First World War.

=== After the Revolution ===
After the Russian Revolution of 1917, Shershenevich lectured on poetry in the Proletkult, in the division of Narkompros that was responsible for publishing a multivolume dictionary of artists. Together with Vladimir Mayakovsky he wrote texts for the ROSTA posters. With V. Kamienski and Ryurik Ivnev he participated in the creation of the All-Russian union of poets, and starting in May 1919 was the group's chairman for more than a year.

In 1918 Shershenevich became close to Sergei Yesenin and Anatoly Marienhof. He founded the "order of imaginists" and became the theorist of imaginism. At this time, 1918–20, his books of poetry exemplify the imaginist period.

During the subsequent years he published the book of poems Cooperatives of merriment (1921), the play One continuous absurdity (1922) and the book about the art of his comrades Marienhof, Ivnev, Kusikov and Yesenin To whom I shake hands (1921). From 1919 through 1925 he participated in nine anthologies, including Foundry of Words (Plavil'nia slov) (1920) with Yesenin and Marienhof.

=== Late years ===
In 1926 Shershenevich published his own collection So, the Summary, his last poetic book. In it he broke with imaginist poetics. He summed up imaginism in these words: "Imaginism is dead ... Poetry has become polemic ... Lyricism is taken away from poetry and poetry without lyricism is as good as a race horse without a leg. Thus the failure of imaginism is understandable, as it always insisted on poetization of poetry."

By that time Shershenevich had moved on to theatre. His plays were performed in theatres in Moscow. He translated plays by Sophocles, Shakespeare, Bertolt Brecht and Charles Baudelaire's Fleurs du Mal. He rewrote the libretti for a number of operettas and is credited as the screenwriter of three films. He also worked as a director in theatres in Moscow and outside of it.

During the early part of World War II Shershenevich, sick with tuberculosis, was evacuated with the Moscow Chamber Theater to Barnaul, where he died on 18 May 1942.

== Works ==
=== Books ===
- Spring Thaw (Весенние проталинки) (c. 1911)
- Carmina (1913)
- Extravagant Flakones (1913)
- Romantic Powder (1913)
- Automobilian Advance (Автомобилья поступь) (1916)
- Crematory. The poem of imaginist (1919)
- Horse like a horse (Лошадь как лошадь) (1920)
- Theory of Free Verse (Notes on Poetic Technique) (Teoriia svobodnogo stikha (zametki o poeticheskoi tekhnike)) (1920) Translator and Editor.
- 2 × 2 = 5 (1920)
- Cooperatives of merriment (1921)
- To whom I shake hands (1921)
- Red Alcohol (Krasnyi Alkogol') (1922) With Matvei Royzman.
- So, the Summary (1926)
- Kinopechat: Igor Ilinisky (1926)

=== Screenplays ===
- When Moscow Laughs (Devushka s korobkoy) (1927)
- A Kiss From Mary Pickford (Potseluy Meri Pikford) (1927)
- The House on Trubnaya (Dom na Trubnoy) (1928)
