= Graal Arelsky =

Russian poet (1889–1937)

- Born: Stepan Stephanovich Petrov; 1888 or 1889; Russian Empire
- Died: April 5, 1937 (aged 47–49); Chibyu, Soviet Union
- Occupations: Poet; writer; astronomer
- Writing career
- Language: Russian
- Notable works: Blue Ajour, Egopoetry in Poetry
- Literary movement: Ego-Futurism

Stepan Stephanovich Petrov (Russian: Сте́фан Сте́фанович Петро́в, IPA: [ˈsʲtʲɛfən ˈsʲtʲɛfənəvʲɪtɕ pʲɪˈtrof]), better known by his pseudonym Graal-Arelsky (Russian: Граа́ль-Аре́льский, IPA: [ɡrɐˈalʲ ɐˈrʲelʲskʲɪj]; 1889–1937), was a Russian Ego-Futurist poet. He co-founded the Academy of Ego-Poetry with fellow Ego-Futurist Konstantin Olimpov. Arelsky is also an identified astronomer.

== Biography ==
Graal Arelsky was born in 1888 (or 1889, according to other sources) to a peasant family. In 1909, after graduating from high school, he studied astronomy at St. Petersburg University. In 1914 he was expelled from the university for non-payment. He worked at the observatory of the People's House. In his student years, he participated in the revolutionary movement and was a member of the Socialist Revolutionary Party.

== Works ==
Arelsky met Igor Severyanin and Konstantin Olimpov, with whom he took part in the evenings of ego-futurists. In 1911 his book of verse, entitled the Blue Ajoure (Goluboi azhur), was published. It was noted for its imitations of Konstantin Balmont and Vasily Bryusov's poetry. Alexander Blok called the author's pseudonym the height of blasphemy and mystical anarchism. Blok approved the book itself, writing:

Your book (with the exception of particulars, especially the pseudonym and title) is close to many of me. You are also tormented by the stellar worlds that you look at, and you speak especially well about the stars...

A year later, he published the article, Egopoetry in Poetry (Egopoezii v poezii) in which he argued that Ego-poetry aims to glorify egoism as the only true and vital intuition. He also maintained that man is a creation of nature so that she rules his actions and egoism, which she placed inside of man and should be developed, is what unites all humanity. He summed up his philosophy thus:

God is eternity. Man in being born is separated from it.

Arelsky was also one of the authors of Prolog Ego-Futurizm, a brochure on Ego-Futurism published in October 1915, along with Igor Severyanin, Olimpov, and George Ivanov. A manifesto was also released the following month.

His second book of poems, "Leteysky shore", was published in 1913 and marked the author's transition from acmeism, cultivated in the "Workshop of Poets", to the "scientism" promoted by him. It presented samples of "scientific poetry" - poems about space and planets and about Giordano Bruno. Arelsky subsequently dedicated his novel The Enemy of Ptolemy (1928) to the latter.

After 1917, he published the poem Wind from the Sea (1923), the play in verse The Nymph Ata (1923), and wrote children's poems. He published several stories of science fiction, including the short story collection Tales of Mars (1925), the short stories Citizen of the Universe (1925), The Man Who Went to Mars (1927), and Gift of the Selenites. He also published a work of popular science, Sun and Time: Popular Astronomy for Peasant Youth (1926).

Several notable literary works were published after he left Ego-Futurism and joined the Acmeist Guild of Poets. These include the Tales from Mars (Povesti o Marse), a compilation of three interconnected fictional stories which culminate in a Martian workers' revolution against their capitalist oppressors.

The science fiction saga "Tales of Mars" consists of three parts ("Professor Dagin's Observatory", "Two Worlds", "Towards a New Sun"), connected with each other only by the place of action - Mars. Arelsky traced a direct connection between the development of the social system and scientific and technological progress, but in a peculiar way: his novel does not feature the struggle of classes, but the struggle of mono-ethnic civilizations: highly developed and primitive. According to science fiction researcher A. Pervushin, this book is the forerunner of Ray Bradbury's The Martian Chronicles.

== Arrest and death ==
He was arrested on December 16, 1935. On April 1, 1936, he was sentenced by the Special Collegium of the Leningrad Regional Court to 10 years in labor camps under article 58-10 of the Criminal Code of the RSFSR for anti-Soviet propaganda and agitation. He was sent to the Ukhta-Pechora camp to serve his sentence.

He died on April 5, 1937, in the village of Chibyu, Komi ASSR. He was rehabilitated by the Supreme Court of the RSFSR on December 23, 1964.
