= Ryurik Ivnev =

Russian poet and novelist (1891–1981)

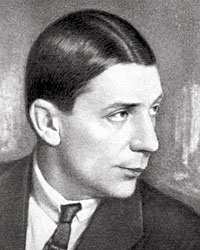
Ivnev c.1915

Rurik Ivnev (Russian: Рю́рик И́внев), born Mikhail Alexandrovich Kovalyov (Russian: Михаи́л Алекса́ндрович Ковалёв) (23 February [O.S. 11 February] 1891 – 19 February 1981), was a Russian poet, novelist and translator.

== Biography ==
=== Early years ===
Rurik Ivnev was born into a nobleman's family in Tiflis (Tbilisi). His father, Alexander Samoylovich Kovalyov, was a Russian army captain. The children (Mikhail had an elder brother, Nikolai) had been brought up by their mother, Anna Petrovna Kovalyova-Prince. Among her ancestors was a Dutch count, who arrived in Russia with Peter I. After the death of their father in 1894, the family moved to Kars, where their mother obtained the position of principal in an all-girls secondary school. At the insistence of their mother, the sons entered the Tiflis Military School, where Mikhail studied from 1900 through 1908. Upon graduating from the school, Mikhail thought better of a military career and headed to St. Petersburg, where he became a student at the Law Department of St. Petersburg University. In 1912 he was forced to leave St. Petersburg University and moved to Moscow to continue his education. In 1913 he graduated from Moscow University with a law diploma and returned to St. Petersburg, where he began his service at the office of government control.

=== Literary Career: Ego-Futurist ===
Rurik Ivnev's first attempts at poetry date from 1904. His first publication was the poem Our Days in a 1909 student almanac that came out in Vyshny Volochek. Two years later he showed his poems and prose to Alexander Blok and received his unfavorable opinion. Another two poems were published in 1912 in the Bolshevik newspaper Iskra. Soon, Mikhail, together with Vadim Shershenevich, Konstantin Olimpov and Vasilisk Gnedov, joined the Ego-Futurist movement and became a frequent contributor to Ego-Futurist almanacs published by Peterburgskiy Glashatay, Tsentrifuga and Mezzanin poezii. In 1913 his first book of poems, Self-immolation, was published.

Mikhail Kovalyov became Rurik Ivnev. The poet himself said that this pseudonym was dreamed up in his sleep on the day before the print of Self-immolation. The book brought the young poet a great reputation. He became a frequent visitor to St. Petersburg literary salons where he met with Dmitry Merezhkovsky, Zinaida Gippius, Mikhail Kuzmin, Nikolay Gumilyov, Anna Akhmatova, Fyodor Sologub and Vladimir Mayakovsky.

=== Russian Revolution and state activity ===
After the victory of the October Revolution, he became the secretary of the People's Commissar of Education Anatoly Lunacharsky . At the same time he cooperates with the newspaper Izvestia VTSIK, and took part in the organising of the IV Extraordinary Congress of Soviets of Workers', Peasants', Soldiers' and Cossack's Deputies .

In 1919, Ivnev was sent to the south as head of the organizing bureau of the propaganda train named after A. V. Lunacharsky, and visited Ukraine and Georgia. Returning to Moscow, in 1921 he headed the All-Russian Union of Poets. During this period, Ivnev's rapprochement with the Imagists begins .

=== 1920s: Imaginist ===
Now in Moscow, joined a new poetic trend, Imaginism, with which he was mainly associated in the 1920s. In 1925 Ivnev visited Germany, then worked in Vladivostok at the Knizhnoe delo publishing house. In 1927 he visited Japan. In the second half of the 1920s Rurik Ivnev published an epic trilogy, The Life of an Actress, which contained the novels Love without the love (1925), The Open House (1927) and The Hero of Novel (1928).

=== Later years ===
With increasing oppression from the Soviet authorities in 1930s and 1940s, Ivnev was reduced to earning his living through translations of foreign-language poetry and writing historical plays. In the late 1930s he worked on an autobiographical novel, At the Foot of Mtatsmindy. In the same period Ivnev began to work on another autobiographical novel, Bohemia, which he completed in the month before his death. At the time he lived in Tbilisi and translated Georgian poetry. In 1950 he returned to Moscow.

After the Stalinist era came to an end, he worked on his memoirs. He died four days before his ninetieth birthday.

== Personal life ==
Ryurik Ivnev had numerous homosexual relationships throughout his life and mentioned those encounters in his diaries, published in 2013.
