= Sergei Yesenin =

Russian poet (1895–1925)

- Сергей Есенин
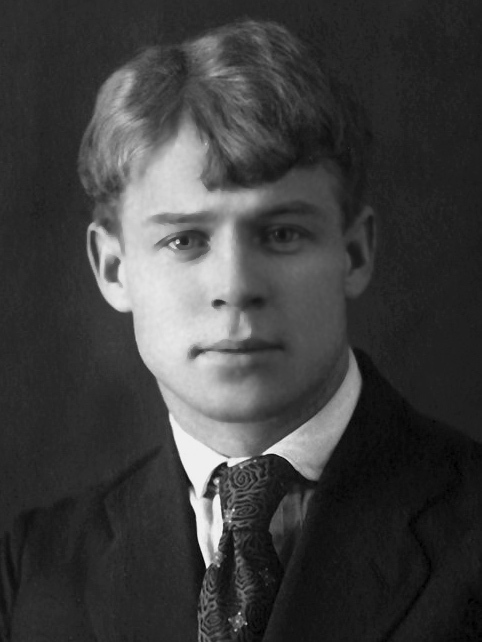
- Yesenin in 1922
- Born: Sergei Alexandrovich Yesenin; 3 October 1895; Konstantinovo, Ryazansky Uyezd, Ryazan Governorate, Russian Empire
- Died: 28 December 1925 (aged 30); Leningrad, Soviet Union
- Cause of death: Suicide by hanging
- Resting place: Vagankovo Cemetery, Moscow
- Occupation: Lyrical poet
- Movement: New peasant poetry, imaginism
- Spouses: Anna Izryadnova (1913–1915); Zinaida Reich (1917–1921); Isadora Duncan (1922–1923); Sophia Tolstaya (1925)
- Children: 3, including Tatyana and Alexander

Sergei Aleksandrovich Yesenin (Note: (Russian: Сергей Александрович Есенин, IPA: [sʲɪrˈɡʲej ɐlʲɪkˈsandrəvʲɪtɕ jɪˈsʲenʲɪn]; also written as Sergei Esenin in English) (3 October [O.S. 21 September] 1895 – 28 December 1925) was a Russian lyric poet. He is one of the most popular and well-known Russian poets of the 20th century. One of his narratives was "lyrical evocations of and nostalgia for the village life of his childhood – no idyll, presented in all its rawness, with an implied curse on urbanisation and industrialisation".

== Biography ==
=== Life and work ===
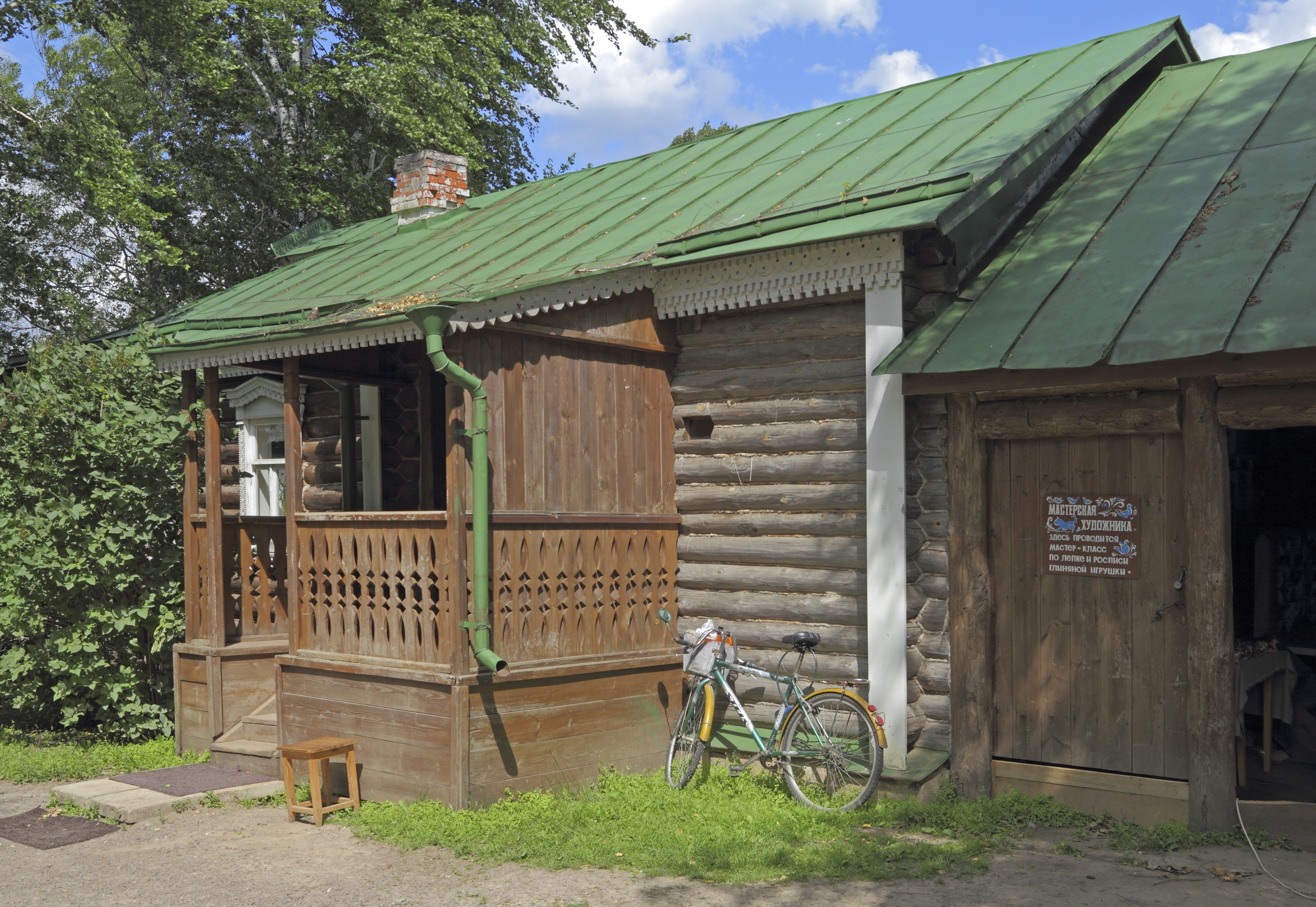
Yesenin's birth house in Konstantinovo

Sergei Yesenin was born in the village of Konstantinovo in Ryazan County, Ryazan Governorate of the Russian Empire (now Rybnovsky District, Ryazan Oblast) into a peasant family. His father was Alexander Nikitich Yesenin (1873–1931), his mother was Tatyana Fyodorovna Yesenina, née Titova, (1875–1955).

Both his parents spent most of their time looking for work, his father in Moscow, his mother in Ryazan, so at age two Sergei was moved to the nearby village of Matovo to join Fyodor Alexeyevich Titov and Natalya Yevtikhiyevna Titova, his relatively well-off maternal grandparents, who essentially raised him.

The Titovs had three grown-up sons, who were Yesenin's companions in his early life. "My uncles taught me horse riding and swimming, one of them... even employed me as a hunting dog when he went duck hunting in local ponds," he later remembered. He started to read at age five, and at nine began to write poetry, inspired originally by chastushkas and folklore, provided mostly by his grandmother, whom he also remembered as a highly religious woman who used to take him to every single monastery she visited. He had two younger sisters, Yekaterina (1905–1977), and Alexandra (1911–1981).

In 1904 Yesenin joined the Konstantinovo zemstvo school, where in 1909 he graduated with an honorary certificate. He then went on to study in the local secondary parish school in Spas-Klepiki. From 1910 onwards he started to write poetry systematically; eight poems dated that year were later included in his 1925 Collected Works. In all, Yesenin wrote around thirty poems during his school years. He compiled them into what was supposed to be his first book, which he entitled "Volnye Dumy" (Free Thoughts) and tried to publish it in 1912 in Ryazan, but failed.

In 1912, with a teacher’s diploma, Yesenin moved to Moscow, where he supported himself working as a proofreader's assistant at Sytin's printing company. The following year he enrolled in Shanyavsky Moscow City People's University to study history and philology as an external student (вольнослушатель), but had to leave after eighteen months due to lack of funds. At the University he became friends with several aspiring poets, among them Dmitry Semyonovsky, Vasily Nasedkin, Nikolai Kolokolov and Ivan Filipchenko. Yesenin’s first marriage (which lasted three years) was in 1913 to Anna Izryadnova, a co-worker from the publishing house, with whom he had a son, Yuri.

1913 saw Yesenin becoming increasingly interested in Christianity, and biblical motives became frequent in his poems. "Grisha, what I am reading at the moment is the Gospel and I find a lot of things which for me are new," he wrote to his close childhood friend G. Panfilov. That was also the year when he became involved with Moscow revolutionary circles: for several months his flat was under secret police surveillance and in September 1913 it was raided and searched.

In January 1914 Yesenin's first published poem, "Beryoza" (The Birch Tree), appeared in the children's magazine Mirok (Small World). More appearances followed in minor magazines such as Protalinka and Mlechny Put. In December 1914 Yesenin left his job "and dedicated himself to poetry, writing continually," according to his wife. Around this time he became a member of the Surikov Literary and Music circle.

In 1915, exasperated with the lack of interest in Moscow, Yesenin moved to Petrograd. He arrived in Petrograd on 8 March and the next day met Alexander Blok at his home, to read him poetry. He was quickly acquainted with fellow poets Sergey Gorodetsky, Nikolai Klyuev and Andrei Bely, who were well known. Blok was especially helpful in promoting Yesenin's early literary career, describing him as "a gem of a peasant poet" and his verse as "fresh, pure and resounding", even if "wordy".

The same year he joined the Krasa (Beauty) group of peasant poets which included Klyuyev, Gorodetsky, Sergey Klychkov and Alexander Shiryayevets, among others. In his 1925 autobiography Yesenin said that Bely gave him the meaning of form while Blok and Klyuev taught him lyricism. It was Klyuyev who introduced Yesenin to the publisher Averyanov, who in early 1916 released his debut poetry collection Radunitsa which featured many of his early spiritual-themed verse. "I would have eagerly relinquished some of my religious poems, large and small, but they make sense as an illustration of a poet's progress towards the revolution," he would later write. Yesenin and Klyuyev maintained close and intimate, a friendship that lasted several years, and indeed it is likely they became lovers.

Later in 1915, Yesenin became a co-founder of the Krasa literary group and published numerous poems in the Petrograd magazines Russkaya Mysl, Ezhemesyachny Zhurnal, Novy Zhurnal Dlya Vsekh, Golos Zhizni and Niva. Among the authors he met later in the year were Maxim Gorky, Vladimir Mayakovsky, Nikolai Gumilyov and Anna Akhmatova; he also visited the painter Ilya Repin in his Penaty. Yesenin's rise to fame was meteoric; by the end of the year he became the star of St Petersburg's literary circles and salons. "The city took to him with the delight a gourmet reserves for strawberries in winter. A barrage of praise hit him, excessive and often insincere," Maxim Gorky wrote to Romain Rolland.

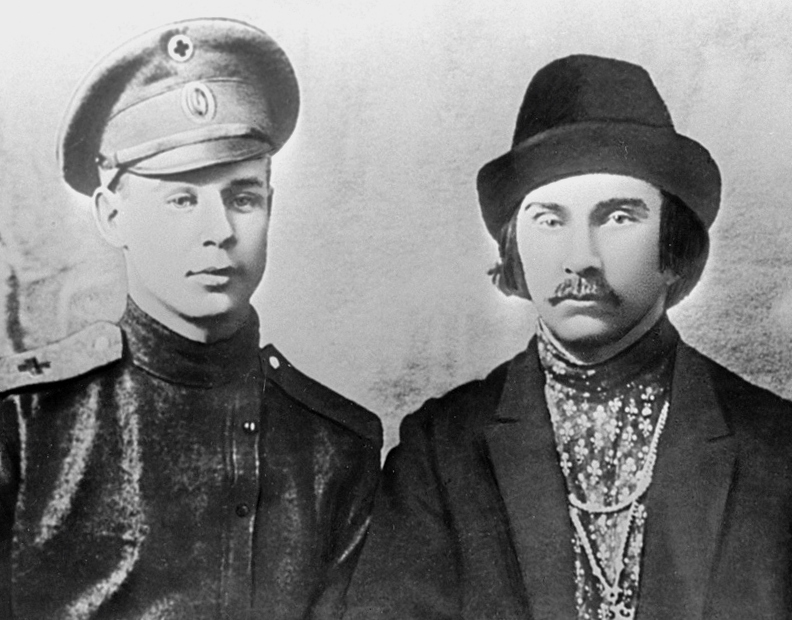
Yesenin and Nikolai Klyuev, circa 1917

On 25 March 1916 Yesenin was drafted for military duty and in April joined a medical train based in Tsarskoye Selo under the command of Colonel D.N. Loman. On 22 July 1916, at a special concert attended by the Empress Alexandra Fyodorovna (the train's patron) and her daughters, Yesenin recited his poems "Rus" and "In Scarlet Fireglow". "The Empress told me my poems were beautiful, but sad. I replied that the same could be said about Russia as a whole," he recalled later. His relationship with Loman soon deteriorated. In October Yesenin declined the colonel's offer to write (with Klyuyev) and have published a book of pro-monarchist verses, and spent twenty days under arrest as a consequence.

In March 1917, Yesenin was sent to the Warrant Officers School but soon deserted Kerensky's army. In August 1917 (having divorced Izryadnova a year earlier) Yesenin married for a second time, to Zinaida Raikh (later an actress and the wife of Vsevolod Meyerhold). They had two children, a daughter Tatyana and a son Konstantin. The parents subsequently quarreled and lived separately for some time prior to their divorce in 1921. Tatyana became a writer and journalist and Konstantin Yesenin would become a well-known soccer statistician.

Yesenin supported the February Revolution. "If not for [it], I might have withered away on useless religious symbolism," he wrote later. He greeted the rise of the Bolsheviks too. "In the Revolution I was all on the side of October, even if I perceived everything in my own peculiar way, from a peasant's standpoint," he remembered in his 1925 autobiography. Later he criticized the Bolshevik rule, in such poems as "The Stern October Has Deceived Me". "I feel very sad now, for we are going through such a period in [our] history when human individuality is being destroyed, and the approaching socialism is totally different from the one I was dreaming of," he wrote in an August 1920 letter to his friend Yevgeniya Livshits. "I never joined the RKP, being further to the left than them," he maintained in his 1922 autobiography.

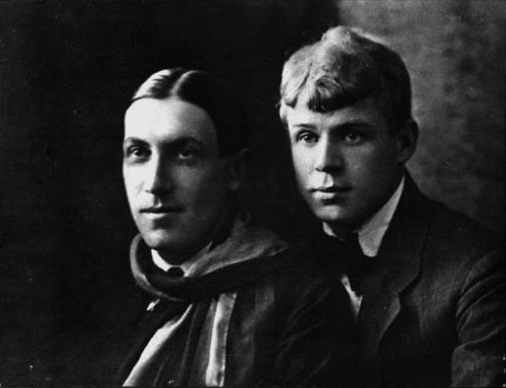
Yesenin (right) with Anatoly Marienhof in 1915

Artistically, the revolutionary years were an exciting time for Yesenin. Among the important poems he wrote in 1917–1918 were "Prishestviye" (The Advent), "Preobrazheniye" (Transfiguration, which gave the title to the 1918 collection), and "Inoniya". In February 1918, after the Sovnarkom issued the "Socialist Homeland is in Danger!" decree-appeal, he joined the esers' military unit. He actively participated in the magazine Nash Put (Our Way), as well as the almanacs Skify (Скифы) and Krasny Zvon (in February his large poem "Marfa Posadnitsa" appeared in an issue of the latter). In September 1918 Yesenin co-founded (with Andrey Bely, Pyotr Oreshin, Lev Povitsky and Sergey Klychkov) the publishing house Трудовая Артель Художников Слова (the Labor Artel of the Artists of the Word) which reissued (in six books) all that he had written up until then.

In September 1918 Yesenin became friends with Anatoly Marienhof, with whom he founded the Russian literary movement of imaginism. Describing their group's general appeal, he wrote in 1922: "Prostitutes and bandits are our fans. With them, we are pals. Bolsheviks do not like us due to some kind of misunderstanding." In January 1919, Yesenin signed the Imaginists' Manifesto. In February he, Marienhof and Vadim Shershenevich, founded the Imaginists' publishing house. Before that, Yesenin became a member of the Moscow Union of Professional Writers and several months later was elected a member of the All-Russian Union of Poets. Two of his books, Kobyli Korabli (Кобыльи корабли, Mare's Ships) and Klyuchi Marii (Ключи Марии, The Keys of Mary) came out later that year.

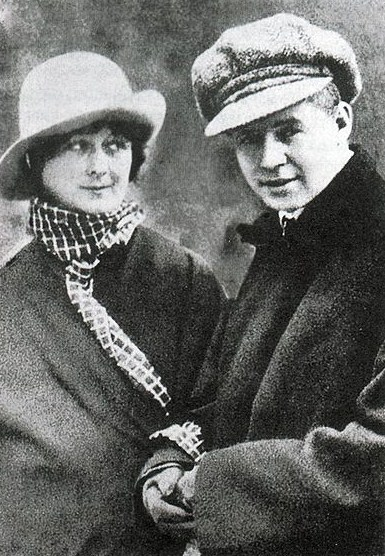
Yesenin and Isadora Duncan (1922)

In July–August 1920, Yesenin toured the Russian South, starting in Rostov-on-Don and ending in Tiflis (Tbilisi), Georgia. In November 1920, he met Galina Benislavskaya, his future secretary and close friend. Following an anonymous report, he and two of his Imaginist friends, brothers Alexander and Ruben Kusikovs, were arrested by the Cheka in October but released a week later on the solicitation of his friend Yakov Blumkin. In the course of that year, the publication of three of Yesenin's books were refused by publishing house Goslitizdat. His Triptych collection came out through the Skify Publishers in Berlin. Next year saw the collections Confession of a Hooligan (January) and Treryaditsa (February) published. The drama in verse Pugachov came out in December 1921, to much acclaim.

In May 1921, he visited a friend, the poet Alexander Shiryaevets, in Tashkent, giving poetry readings and making a short trip to Samarkand. In the autumn of 1921, while visiting the studio of painter Georgi Yakulov, Yesenin met the Paris-based American dancer Isadora Duncan, a woman 18 years his senior. She knew only a dozen words in Russian, and he spoke no foreign languages. Nevertheless, they married on 2 May 1922. Yesenin accompanied his celebrity wife on a tour of Europe and the United States. His marriage to Duncan was brief and in May 1923, he returned to Moscow.

In his 1922 autobiography, Yesenin wrote: "Russia's recent nomadic past does not appeal to me, and I am all for civilization. But I dislike America intensely. America is a stinking place where not just art is being murdered, but with it, all the loftiest aspirations of humankind. If it's America that we are looking up to, as [a model for our] future, then I'd rather stay under our greyish skies... We do not have those skyscrapers that have so far managed to produce nothing but Rockefeller and McCormick, but here Tolstoy, Dostoyevsky, Pushkin and Lermontov were born."

In 1923, Yesenin became romantically involved with the actress Augusta Miklashevskaya to whom he dedicated several poems, among them those of the Hooligan's Love cycle. In the same year, he had a son by the poet Nadezhda Volpina. Alexander Esenin-Volpin grew up to become a poet and a prominent activist in the Soviet dissident movement of the 1960s. From 1972 until his death in 2016 he lived in the United States as a famous mathematician and teacher.

As Yesenin's popularity grew, stories began to circulate about his heavy drinking and consequent public outbursts. In autumn 1923, he was arrested in Moscow twice and underwent a series of inquiries from the OGPU secret police. Other accusations against Yesenin and three of his close friends, fellow poets Sergey Klytchkov, Alexei Ganin and Pyotr Oreshin, were made by Lev Sosnovsky, a journalist and close Trotsky associate. The foursome retorted with an open letter in Pravda and, in December, were cleared by the Writers' Union comrades' court. It was later suggested, though, that Yesenin's departure to the Caucasus in the summer of 1924 might have been a direct result of harassment by the NKVD. Earlier that year fourteen writers and poets, including his friend Ganin, were arrested as alleged members of the (apparently fictitious) Order of Russian Fascists. They were tortured and executed in March without trial.

In January–April 1924 Yesenin was arrested and interrogated four times. In February he was admitted to the Sheremetev hospital, then moved into the Kremlin clinic in March. Nevertheless, he continued to make public recitals and released several books in the course of the year, including Moskva Kabatskaya. In August 1924 Yesenin and fellow poet Ivan Gruzinov published a letter in Pravda, announcing the end of the Imaginists.

In 1924–1925, Yesenin visited Azerbaijan, and stayed in the village of Mardakan, where he published a collection of poems in the "Krasny Vostok" printing house, and was also published in a local publishing house. According to one source it was here, in May 1925, that the poetic “Message to the Evangelist Demyan” was written. There is today a street and a museum house in memory of the poet in Mardakan, Azerbaijan.

In early 1925 Yesenin met and married Countess Sophia Andreyevna Tolstaya (1900–1957), a granddaughter of Leo Tolstoy. In May, what proved to be his final large poem, Anna Snegina, came out. During that year he compiled and edited The Works of Yesenin in three volumes which were published by Gosizdat posthumously.

=== Death ===
On 26 December 1925, Yesenin slit his left wrist and used his own blood to write a final poem: Goodbye my friend, goodbye (До свиданья, друг мой, до свиданья). The next day he hanged himself and on 28 December the 30-year-old Yesenin was found dead in his room in the Hotel Angleterre in Leningrad.

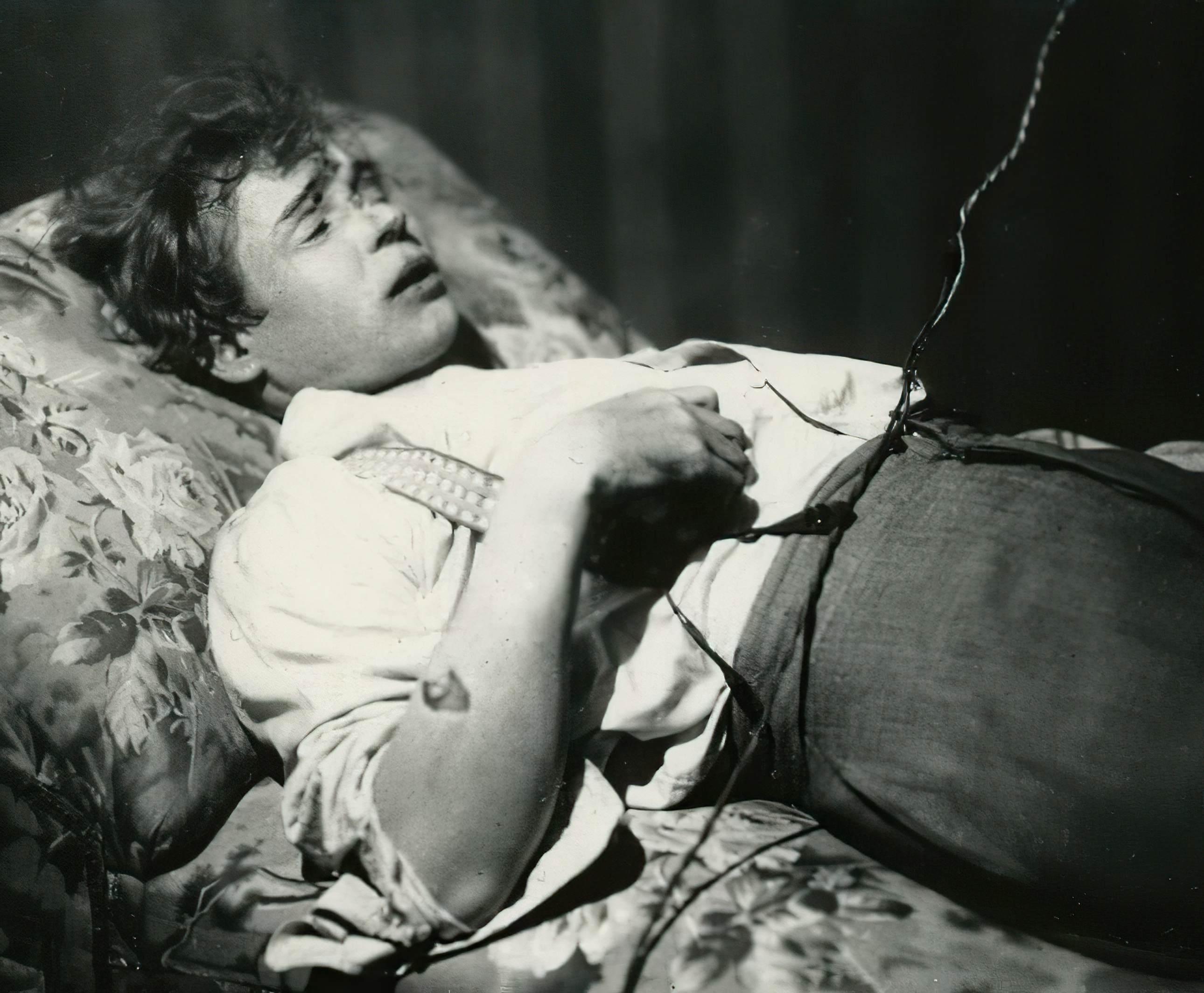
Yesenin's corpse in his hotel room

До свиданья, друг мой, до свиданья.
Милый мой, ты у меня в груди.
Предназначенное расставанье
Обещает встречу впереди.
До свиданья, друг мой, без руки, без слова,
Не грусти и не печаль бровей, –
В этой жизни умирать не ново,
Но и жить, конечно, не новей.

Translation:

Farewell, my good friend, farewell.
In my heart, forever, you’ll stay.
May the fated parting foretell
That again we’ll meet up someday.
Let no words, no handshakes ensue,
No saddened brows in remorse, –
To die, in this life, is not new,
And living’s no newer, of course.

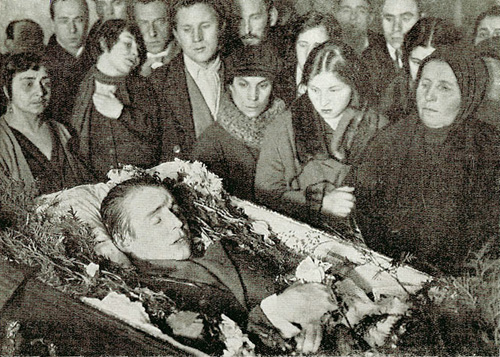
Sergey Yesenin in his coffin. The second woman on the left, hand raised, is Zinaida Reich

An alternate translation of the final stanza reads:

Goodbye, my friend, without a word or hand shake,
Don't be sad, and do not muse
In this life to die is nothing novel,
But to live, of course, is hardly greater news.

According to his biographers, the poet was in a state of depression and died by suicide by hanging. After the funeral in Leningrad, Yesenin's body was transported by train to Moscow, where a farewell for relatives and friends of the deceased was also arranged. He was buried on 31 December 1925, in Moscow's Vagankovskoye Cemetery. His grave is marked by a white marble sculpture.

There is a theory that Yesenin's death was actually a murder by OGPU agents who had staged it to look like a suicide. The novel Yesenin: Story of a Murder by Vitali Bezrukov, is devoted to that version of Yesenin's death. In 2005, a TV serial simply titled Yesenin, based on the novel, was shown on Channel One Russia, with Sergey Bezrukov playing Yesenin. Facts tending to support the assassination hypothesis were cited by Stanislav Kunyaev and Sergey Kunyaev in the final chapter of their biography of Yesenin. The theory is rejected by historians, most notably Oleg Lekmanov and Mikhail Sverdlov, who in their monograph on Yesenin's life criticized both the book and series for being based on an antisemitic theory that Jews had organized his death, rather than known facts of his death; they also criticized the series for mocking Yesenin rather than presenting him neutrally, and rejected the hypothesis that he was killed by Soviet authorities.

Enraged by his death, Mayakovsky composed a poem called To Sergei Yesenin, where the resigned ending of Yesenin's death poem is countered by these verses: "in this life it is not hard to die, / to mold life is more difficult." In a later lecture on Yesenin, he said that the revolution demanded "that we glorify life." However, Mayakovsky himself died by suicide on 14 April 1930 at the age of 36.

=== Cultural impact ===
Yesenin's suicide triggered an epidemic of copycat suicides, which reached its peak in 1926. Although he was one of Russia's most popular poets, some of his writings were banned by the Kremlin during the reigns of Joseph Stalin and Nikita Khrushchev. Nikolai Bukharin's criticism of Yesenin contributed significantly to the banning.

Only in 1966 were most of his works republished. Today Yesenin's poems are taught to Russian schoolchildren; many have been set to music and recorded as popular songs. His early death, coupled with unsympathetic views by some of the literary elite, adoration by ordinary people, and sensational behavior, all contributed to the enduring and near mythical popular image of the Russian poet.

Ukrainian composer Tamara Maliukova Sidorenko (1919–2005) set several of Yesenin’s poems to music.

German composer Bernd Alois Zimmermann (1918-1970) included Yesenin's poetry in his Requiem für einen jungen Dichter (Requiem for a Young Poet), completed in 1969.

The Ryazan State University is named in Yesenin's honor.

British metalcore band Bring Me the Horizon quoted Yesenin's farewell poem "Goodbye, my friend, goodbye" in their song "It Was Written In Blood" from 2008 album Suicide Season.

== Multilanguage editions ==
Anna Snegina (Yesenin's poem translated into 12 languages; translated into English by Peter Tempest) ISBN 978-5-7380-0336-3

== Works ==
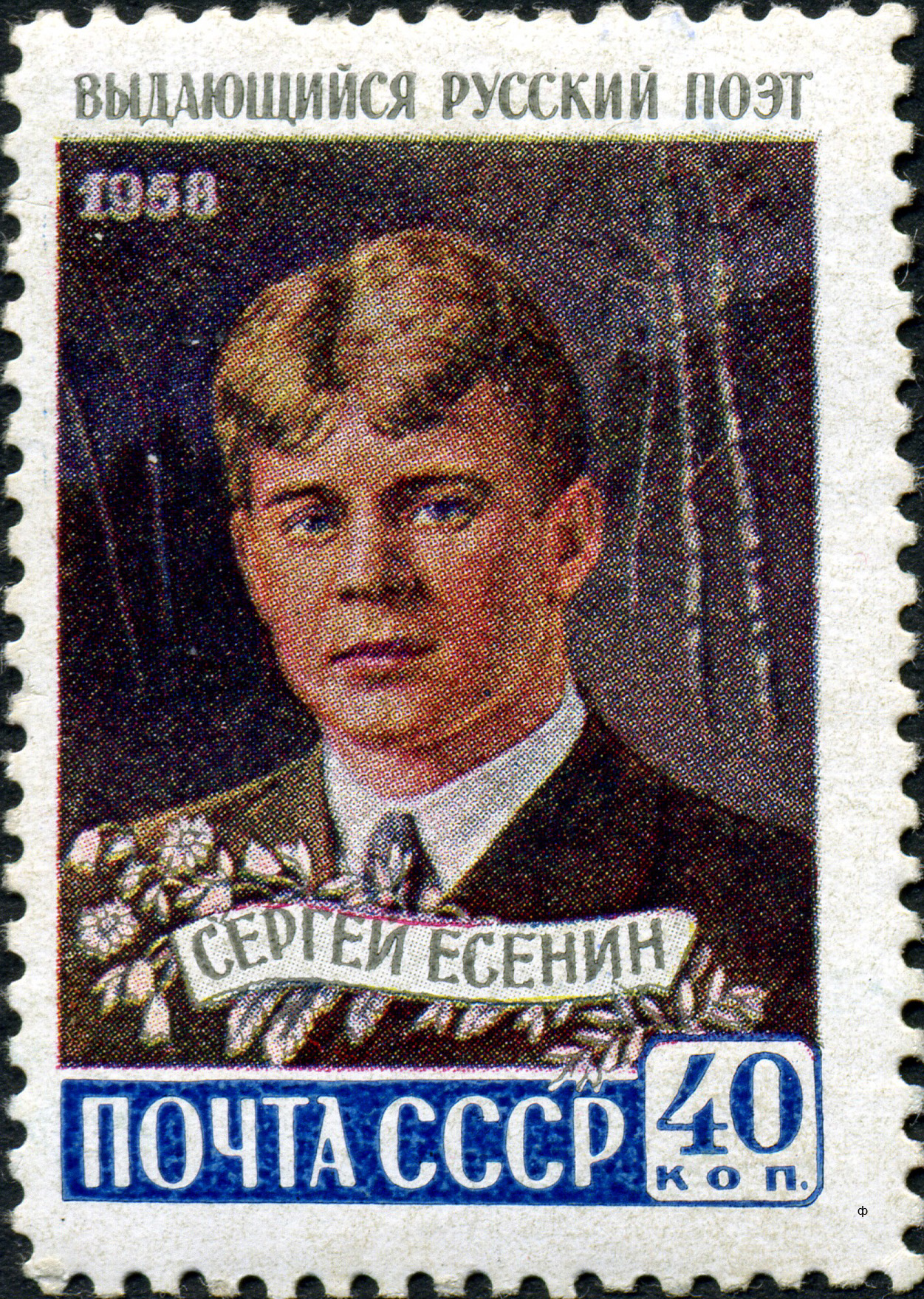
Yesenin on a 1958 stamp

During Yesenin's lifetime, his works were translated into 18 languages: German, English, Swedish, French, Italian, Polish, Croatian, Czech, Bulgarian, Serbian, Slovenian, Ukrainian, Belarusian, Latvian, Armenian, Georgian, Japanese and Yiddish. Only Yiddish translations were out of print at the time (a separate book of Esenin in Yiddish would be published in 1931). In total, there are 132 publications of lifetime translations of 47 of Esenin's works (and/or fragments of them). Some have been published more than once.

He wrote a novella Яр (The Ravine, 1916) and two tales: У белой воды (At the White Waters, 1916) and Бобыль и Дружок (The Poor Man and his Pal, 1917).

List of Sergei Yesenin's works:

- The Scarlet of the Dawn (1910)
- The High Waters Have Licked (1910)
- The Birch Tree (1913)
- Autumn (1914)
- Russia (1914)
- A Song About a Dog/The Bitch (1915)
- I'll glance in the field (1917)
- I left the native home (1918)
- Hooligan (1919)
- Hooligan's Confession (1920) (Italian translation sung by Angelo Branduardi)
- I am the last poet of the village (1920)
- Prayer for the First Forty Days of the Dead (1920)
- I don't pity, don't call, don't cry (1921)
- Pugachev (1921)
- Land of Scoundrels (1923)
- One joy I have left (1923)
- A Letter to Mother (1924)
- Tavern Moscow (1924)
- Confessions of a Hooligan (1924),
- A Letter to a Woman (1924),
- Desolate and Pale Moonlight (1925)
- The Black Man (1925)
- To Kachalov's Dog (1925)
- Who Am I, What Am I (1925)
- Goodbye, my friend, goodbye (1925) (His farewell poem)
