= Dmitri Kryuchkov =

Russian writer (1887–1938)

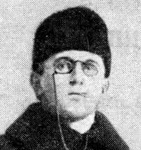
D. A. Kryuchkov

Dmitri Aleksandrovich Kryuchkov (Russian: Дмитрий Александрович Крючков; 14 April 1887 – 18 January 1938) was a Russian poet and a convert to Catholicism.

== Early life ==
Kryuchkov was born in 1887 in Saint Petersburg in a middle-class family. He studied in a German high school, but did not graduate.

== Career ==
Kryuchkov was engaged in the course of Ego-Futurism poetry and published two collections of poetry (in 1913 and 1914). Much of his poetry had themes of landscapes and religion. His first book of poetry was titled "Padun Nemolchnyi" (The Incessant Faller) published in 1913. His second book of poetry was titled "Tsvety Ledyanye" (Icy Flowers) and was published in 1914, featuring poems exclusively about winter landscapes. As Ego-Futurism eventually dissipated, Kryuchkov faded into obscurity along with other poets of this movement.

Kryuchkov served as a psalmist in the Orthodox Church of Saint Panteleimon. In autumn 1922, he met with Leonid Feodorov, Exarch of the Russian Greek Catholic Church. On August 19, 1923 Kryuchkov joined to Catholic Church. He worked as a writer-translator for the state publishing house World Literature.

On December 7, 1923, he was arrested and tried in the group case of Russian Catholics. On December 19, 1923, Kryuchkov was sent for further investigation in Moscow and imprisoned in Butyrskaya prison. On May 19, 1924, he was sentenced under Article 61 of the Criminal Code of the RSFSR to 10 years in prison. He was sent to Irkutsk politizolator (political prison), and eventually transferred to the Osinovskoye subcamp (lagotdelenie) of Siblag, where he worked in the mines of Aralichev and Osinovka. On December 22, 1932, he was released from the camp ahead of time with banned residence in 12 major cities and the Ural region.

== Personal life ==
Since January 1933, Kryuckkov lived in Yaroslavl, where he was again arrested in 1936 and sentenced to 15 years in labor camps. He died there in 1938.
