= In a Station of the Metro =

Imagist poem in English by Ezra Pound published in 1913

"In a Station of the Metro" is an Imagist poem by Ezra Pound published in April 1913 in the literary magazine Poetry. In the poem, Pound describes a moment in the underground metro station in Paris in 1912; he suggested that the faces of the individuals in the metro were best put into a poem not with a description but with an "equation". Because of the treatment of the subject's appearance by way of the poem's own visuality, it is considered a quintessential Imagist text.

It is sometimes considered to be the first haiku published in English, though it lacks the traditional 3-line, 17-syllable structure of haiku.

The poem was reprinted in Pound's collection Lustra in 1917, and again in the 1926 anthology Personae: The Collected Poems of Ezra Pound, which compiled his early pre-Hugh Selwyn Mauberley works.

== The poem ==
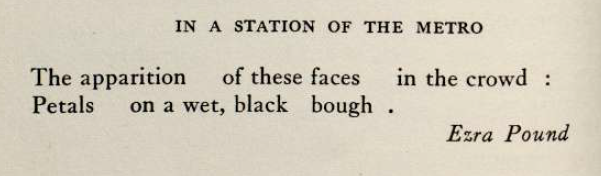
As originally published in Poetry Magazine, April 13, 1913

The poem contains only fourteen words (without a verb therein—making it a good example of the verbless poetry form).

Pound was influential in the creation of Imagist poetry until he left the movement to embrace Vorticism in 1914. Pound, though briefly, embraced Imagism, stating that it was an important step away from the verbose style of Victorian literature and suggested that it "is the sort of American stuff I can show here in Paris without its being ridiculed". "In a Station of the Metro" is an early work of Modernist poetry as it attempts to "break from the pentameter", incorporates the use of visual spacing as a poetic device, and does not contain any verbs. The work originally appeared with different spacing between the groups of words. This can be found in the online version of Poetry magazine for April 1913.

== Analysis ==
The poem was first published in 1913 and is considered one of the leading poems of the Imagist tradition. Pound's process of deletion from thirty lines to only fourteen words typifies Imagism's focus on economy of language, precision of imagery and experimenting with non-traditional verse forms. The poem is Pound's written equivalent for the moment of revelation and intense emotion he felt at the Paris Métro's Concorde station.

The poem is essentially a set of images that have unexpected likeness and convey the rare emotion that Pound was experiencing at that time. Arguably, the heart of the poem is not the first line, nor the second, but the mental process that links the two together. "In a poem of this sort," as Pound explained, "one is trying to record the precise instant when a thing outward and objective transforms itself, or darts into a thing inward and subjective."

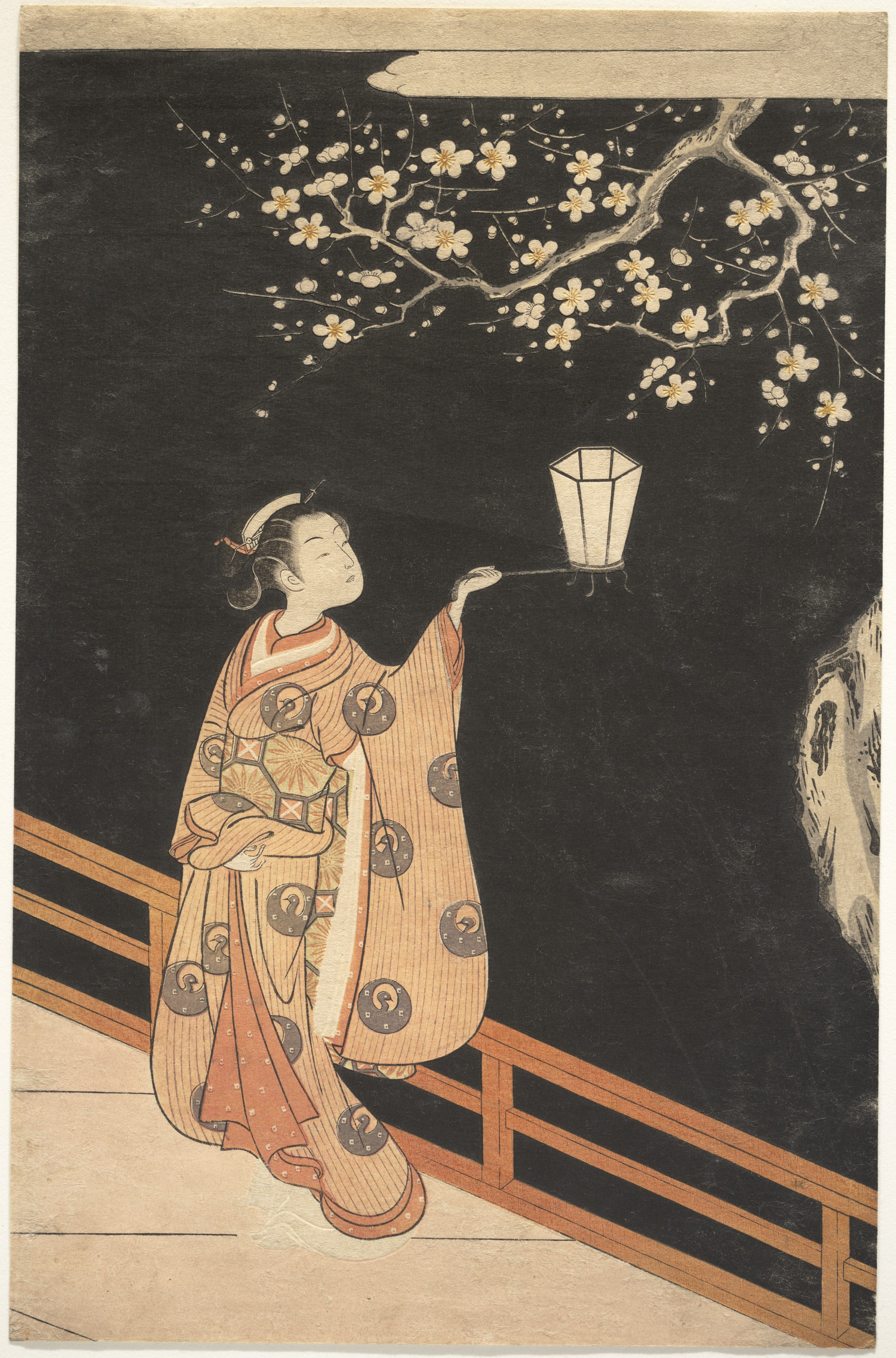
Rupert Richard Arrowsmith posited that Pound may have been inspired by this eighteenth-century ukiyo-e print by Suzuki Harunobu he saw in the British Library: Woman Admiring Plum Blossoms at Night.

Like other modernist artists of the period, Pound found inspiration in Japanese art, but the tendency was to remake and to meld cultural styles rather than to copy directly or slavishly. He may have been inspired by a Suzuki Harunobu print he almost certainly saw in the British Library (Rupert Richard Arrowsmith mentions the specific prints he matched to verse), and probably attempted to write haiku-like verse during this period.

== See also ==
- Verbless poetry

== Sources ==
- Ezra Pound "Vorticism", in The Fortnightly Review, Sept. 1, 1914
- The Cat Empire, "The Crowd", Nov/Dec, 2004
- Rupert Richard Arrowsmith, Modernism and the Museum: Asian, African, and Pacific Art and the London Avant-Garde (Oxford University Press, 2011), ISBN 978-0-191-59568-4
