= Verbless poetry =

A verbless poem, a poem without verbs. Ezra Pound's "In a Station of the Metro" is a verbless poem of fourteen words:

The apparition of these faces in the crowd;
Petals on a wet, black bough.

Afanasy Fet produced two other classics of the genre: "Storm in the evening sky" (Буря на небе вечернем, 1842) and "Whisper, timid breathing" (Шепот, робкое дыханье, 1850). Otto Jespersen observed that the absence of verbs can give "a very definite impression of motion." It has been called "poetry without any dress, without ornament".

== See also ==
- Haiku
- Haiku in English
- Imagism
- Imaginism
