= Vadim Bayan =

Russian poet, writer and playwright

- Вадим Баян
- Born: Vladimir Ivanovich Sidorov; 5 January 1880; Novovasilevka, Taurida Governorate, Russian Empire
- Died: 29 March 1966 (aged 77); Moscow
- Occupations: Poet; prose writer; playwright
- Writing career
- Language: Russian
- Period: Modern
- Movement: Russian Futurism

Vadim Bayan (born Vladimir Ivanovich Sidorov; 5 January 1880 – 29 March 1966) was a Russian futurist poet, writer and playwright.

== Biography ==
Vladimir Ivanovich Sidorov (Russian: Владимир Иванович Сидоров) was born in 1880 to the family of an agronomist in the village of Novovasilevka, Berdyansky Uyezd, Taurida Governorate, in the Russian Empire. He graduated from real school in Melitopol and worked as an office clerk. In 1906, he moved to Simferopol, where he worked as a proofreader in a printing house.

He was known primarily for his 'cosmopoems' Universe on the Plakh (Russian: Вселенная на плахе, 1919–1920) and On the Pavement of Millennia (Russian: По мостовой тысячелетий, (1922), as well as his memoirs Mayakovsky in the First Olympiad of Russian Futurists (Russian: Маяковский в первой олимпиаде футуристов).

He made his debut in the Simferopol newspaper Tavrichanin in 1908 with the poem "Two Horses". In the same year in Melitopol was published his book Compressed Tape. A novel (in verse) 1905-1908 (Russian: Сжатая лента. Роман (в стихах). (1905—1908). In 1910 in Petersburg he listened to lectures on philosophy and natural sciences at the Lesgaft Higher Courses. Then he printed at his own expense the book Lyrical Stream. Lyrionettes and Barcarolles (1914).

In 1914 he organised and partially financed poetry evenings in the cities of Crimea, called the Olympics of Russian Futurism, which were attended by Vladimir Mayakovsky, David Burliuk, Igor Severyanin and others.

Having stayed in Crimea during the revolutions of 1917 and the Civil War, he created a literary association and helped young poets, including Boris Poplavsky (1903–1935). In 1919 he published the book Radio (Russian: Радио), which included his cosmopoem The Universe on the Plakh, a note by his sister, the poetess and critic Maria Kalmykova, and a portrait of Bayan by Vladimir Mayakovsky. He sent his anthologies From the Battery of the Heart, ‘A Chopped Kiss from the Lips of the Universe’ to Mayakovsky with the inscriptions: "To Mayakovsky, the Great".

From 1922 he lived in Moscow, wrote for amateur performances, composed samples of new ‘Soviet rituals’ for young people - parties, games, dances and weddings. The result of these works was the book Kumachovye goulanka (Russian: Кумачовые гулянки), twice published by the publishing house Molodaya Gvardiya (‘Young Guard’).

Bayan is probably the prototype of the opportunistic writer Oleg Bayan from Mayakovsky's play Klop. Offended by this use of his pseudonym, in 1929 he published an "Open Letter to Mayakovsky" in the Literaturnaya gazeta and received a dismissive reply from the latter.

In the 1930s he withdrew from poetry, writing one-act plays, political sketches, and conferences. His unpublished drama in five acts, Pushkin, and a major novel about the people of the Soviet provinces, Olga Korableva, have survived.

For the last 15 years of his life, he worked as a graphic designer.

He died in Moscow in 1966, buried in Vagankovo Cemetery.

He was featured as a character in the novel by V. V. Bondarenko The Captain's Grandson (2018), set in 1919 in Alexandrovsk.
