= Land of Scoundrels =

- Author: Sergei Yesenin
- Original title: Страна негодяев
- Language: Russian
- Publication date: 1924
- Publication place: Soviet Union
- Media type: Print

Land of Scoundrels (Russian: Страна негодяев, Strana Negodyayev) is a poem by Russian poet Sergei Yesenin completed in 1923. It depicts a conflict between a freedom-loving anarchist rebel named Nomakh (anagram alluding to Nestor Makhno) and Bolshevik commissar Rassvetov, who dreams of forcefully modernized Russia. Yesenin was moved to writing the poem after bitter contemplations on Russian rebellion in drama Pugachev. Other motifs include his reflections on the nature of business-driven modern United States, visited by Yesenin around the time of the poem composition.

After the publication the poem was seen as a critique of Soviet rule. Its contents could be interpreted as an apology of peasant (or "anarchist") rebellion or casting of Bolshevik order as an artificial one, imposed on the people by non-Russian commissars. Following the Land of Scoundrels Yesenin went on to bitter Moscow of Taverns finished next year and even tried to provide repentance of sorts by publication of Russia of Soviets compilation in 1925.

Contemporary commentators agree that questions posed by Yesenin in the poem more than eighty years ago still have immediate bearing for today's Russia: to what extent the Russian people is responsible for the current state of affairs, whether the end of the old regime was brought by peasants' love for freedom or was imposed by foreign influences, and to whom belongs the country's future.

== Synopsis ==
The action takes place in the Ural region in 1919. The main protagonist is gangster Nomakh who is shown as a romantic rebel and anarchist hating "those getting fat on Marx". In past he held revolutionary ideas in hopes of liberation of mankind, these aspirations (in their peasant interpretation) were close to Yesenin himself. In the poem Nomakh expresses many of Yesenin's own deep thoughts on love for rebellion and hatred for the unnatural and 'un-Russian' order imposed on Russia by Bolshevik commissars. His adversary Rassvetov (from Russian "rassvet", the raise of new day) is a commissar and his portrait is bleak and schematic comparing to character of Nomakh. Aside from their juxtaposition, one character trait unifying both Nomakh and Rassvetov is their unscrupulousness. Nomakh talks of many gangs multiplying in Russia and of growing ranks of disillusioned rebels ready to kill and plunder. He is full of disregard and contempt to "sheep for whom the shepherd is nurturing knives". This is matched by Rassvetov's amorality who before the revolution participated in gold trading stings on Klondike and whose paramount aim is his own survival. Rassvetov is convinced that fraud is acceptable as a mean to redistribute wealth from rich to poor. He dreams of a "steel enema for the whole of Russia" that will transform and modernize the country.

Nomakh mounts a successful raid on a train passing Ural line. The poem opens with former factory worker Zamarashkin (from Russian "Zamarashka" - puny, albeit likable, squalid person) standing guard near the rail line. He is confronted by irate commissar Chekistov (made-up name meaning literally "Cheka man") who engages in a long diatribe telling of his contempt for Russians being lazy, insensitive and brutal savages. Zamarashkin retorts that Chekistov's real name is Leibman and even despite the fact he arrived to Russia from Weimar he really should belong to some shtetl in the Mogilev area. When Chekistov leaves Nomakh appears: he knows Zamarashkin personally and suggests that the latter should join the band. Zamarashkin refuses, so the gangsters tie him with rope then take control over the rail semaphores, which allows them to stop the train. Rassvetov is on the train with gold cargo and along with other commissars (named Charin and Lobok) engaged in conversation on the future "americanized" Russia, suggesting that the present republic "is a bluff". Nomakh raids the train, plundering the gold and blowing up the engine. Following the raid the pursuit after Nomakh begins: it is headed by Rassvetov and the best bet is enlisting the detective, Chinese communist Litza Hun. Litza Hun tracks Nomakh to an underground tavern where former white officers, now drunkards, are smoking opium in nostalgic dreams of the lost glory of Imperial Russia. Nomakh and another gangster named Barsuk (Russian for Badger) show contempt to their sentiments for times past. Nomakh (followed by Litza Hun) heads to Kiev where the detective tries to arrest him. In the final part of the poem Chekistov discovers that Nomakh has outwitted the detective and has disappeared. Nomakh hides behind the Peter the Great portrait on the wall and (probably symbolically) surveys the scene through Peter's eyes. One of the possible interpretations is that Yesenin is undecided whether the future belongs to anarchist rebel Nomakh (who emerges as a victor) or to cynical Rassvetov; however the point is made that likes of Chekistov, Litza Hun, along with featureless commissars Charin and Lobok, or drunk white officers, are clear losers.
