= Imaginism =

Russian poetry movement

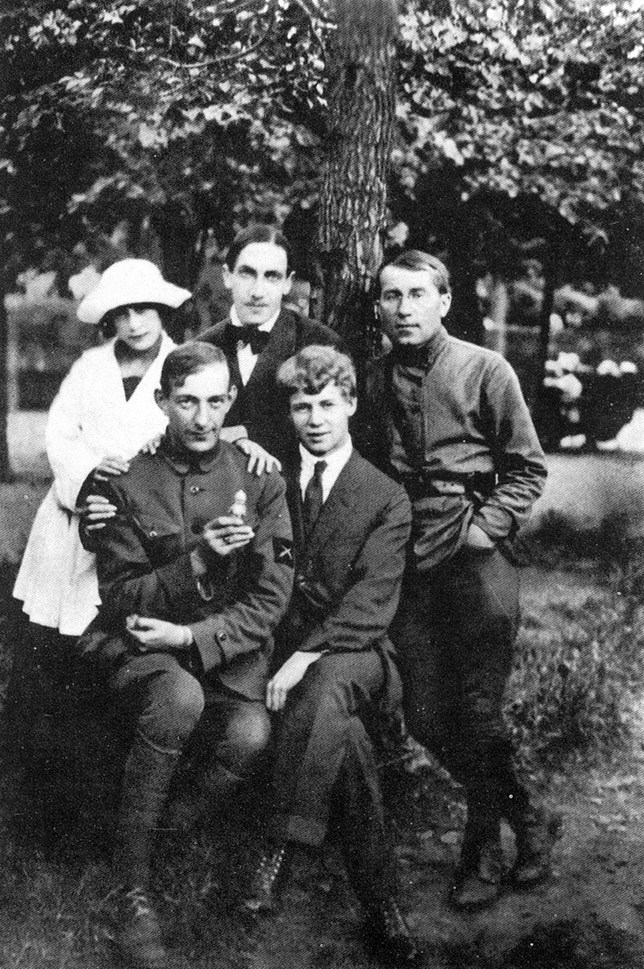
Sitting: Vadim Shershenevich and Sergey Yesenin; standing: Fanny Shereshevskaya, Anatoly Marienhof, Ivan Gruzinov 1919

Imaginism was a 1918–1925 literary association of Russian poets of the Silver Age. Representatives of imaginism stated that the purpose of creativity is to create an image. The main expressive means of imaginists is metaphor, often metaphorical chains that juxtapose various elements of two images: direct and figurative. The creative practice of the imaginists was characterized by outrageous, anarchic motives.

== History ==
Imaginism was founded in 1918 in Moscow by a group of poets including Anatoly Marienhof, Vadim Shershenevich, and Sergei Yesenin, who wanted to distance themselves from the Futurists; the name may have been influenced by imagism.

Stylistically, they were heirs to Ego-Futurism. Imaginists created poetry based on sequences of arresting and uncommon images. They wrote many verbless poems.

Other members of the group were the poets Rurik Ivnev, Alexander Kusikov, Ivan Gruzinov, Matvey Royzman, and the prominent Russian dramatist Nikolay Erdman. In January 1919 they issued a manifesto, whose text was largely written by Shershenevich.

Most of the imaginists were freethinkers and atheists. Imaginism had its main centres in Moscow and St. Petersburg. There were also smaller centres of imaginism in Kazan, Saransk, and Ukraine. Imaginists organised four poetry publishing houses, one of which was called simply Imaginism, and published the poetry magazine Gostinitsa dlya puteshestvuyuschih v prekrasnom ("Guesthouse for travellers in the beautiful").

The group broke up in 1925, and in 1927 it was liquidated officially. Its heritage, though, is still strong in Russia. Poems by Yesenin and Shershenevich, memoirs by Marienhof, and plays by Erdman are still in print and always in demand.

After the disappearance of the group, the "young imaginists" declared themselves followers of this trend in the early 1930s, and so did the "meloimaginists" of the 1990s.

== Literature ==
- Markov, V. Russian Imaginism 1919-1924. Gießen 1980.
- Nilsson, N. The Russian imaginists. Ann Arbor: Almgvist and Wiksell, 1970.
- Huttunen, T. Imazhinist Mariengof: Dendi. Montazh. Ciniki. Moscow: NLO, 2007.
- Ponomareff, C. "The Image Seekers: Analysis of Imaginists Poetic Theory, 1919-1924." The Slavic and East European Journal 12 (1986).
- Kudryavitsky, A. "Popytka zvuka." Novoe literaturnoe obozrenie 35 (1999).

== See also ==
- Verbless poetry
