= Johann Gockel-Ehrlich =

Austrian communist (1896–1938)

Johann Gockel-Ehrlich, Hans Gockel, Gans Gansovich Gokkel' (Ганс Гансович Гоккель)
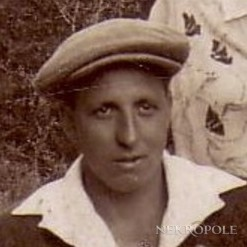
- Born: Johann Gockel-Ehrlich; 8 July 1896; Salzburg, Austria-Hungary.
- Died: 11 March 1938 (aged 41); Ukhtpechlag, USSR
- Occupation(s): activist of the Austrian and Soviet communist movement, editor-in-chief of the atheistic magazine Neuland

Johann Gockel-Ehrlich (Hans Gockel; Russian: Ганс Гансович Гоккель; 8 July 1896 − 11 March 1938) was an Austrian communist. He was an activist in the Austrian and Soviet communist movement, and editor-in-chief of Neuland magazine.

== Early life ==
Gockel-Ehrlich was born in Salzburg in 1896. His parents ran a paper goods store in Hallein. Gockel-Ehrlich learned bookbinding in Salzburg and Hallein.

== Communist activist ==
In 1919, he joined the Communist Party of Austria. Gockel-Ehrlich founded several Party groups in western Austria, becoming chairman of the Communist Party of Austria in Hallein.

In 1920, he joined the Communist Party of the Soviet Union. In 1923 Gockel-Ehrlich emigrated to the Union of Soviet Socialist Republics, where he became the first Austrian student at the Communist University of the National Minorities of the West in Moscow, which he left before the end of the one-year course.

Haeckel-Erlich then moved to Kharkiv, where he began to work as an editor in the German department of the central publishing house. In 1926 he became editor-in-chief of the atheistic magazine Neuland. This magazine was published in German and provided communist and atheist propaganda among the German-speaking population of the USSR.

Living there he received a new name, Gans Gansovich Gockel (Ганс Гансович Гоккель). He signed his writings in the USSR as Hans Gockel, publishing several books.

Gockel-Ehrlich was arrested on 10 December 1933 for participating in a German counter-revolutionary organization, which allegedly sought to overthrow the Soviet regime by force of arms. In his house, two revolvers were discovered during a search. He was convicted under Article 54 of the Criminal Code of the Ukrainian SSR for allegedly maintaining relations with the German consulate and supporting Hitler’s agitation. By the decision of the NKVD troika under the college of the GPU of the Ukrainian SSR of 29 May 1934, he was imprisoned for 10 years in a labour camp.

Gockel-Ehrlich served his sentence in Ukhtpechlag. In the camp, he was a senior rationing officer for the 9th detachment of railway construction. While in the camp, he was arrested on 19 December 1937 and sentenced on 5 January 1938 by the “troika” under the administration of the NKVD of the Arkhangelsk Oblast under articles 58–10 and 58-11 of the Criminal Code of the RSFSR to capital punishment. The verdict was executed on 11 March 1938. In 1937, his wife tried in vain to persuade the Austrian Legation to intervene in favor of her husband.

He was rehabilitated on 26 September 1959.

== Works ==
- Gockel H. ... Was wollen die Gottlosen? / H. Gockel. - Харків : Zentralrat des Verbandes der kämpfenden Gottlosen der Ukraine (Deutsche Sektion), 1929. - 29 с.; 15 см;
- Gockel H. ... Dem kommenden Krieg entgegen / Hans Gockel. - Moskau; Charkow; Pokrowsk: Zentralverlag, Allukrainisches Abteilung, 1931. - 84 S.;
- Gockel H. ... Wilde Tiere / Zeichnungen A. Pestun-Dibrowsky; Text H. Gockel. - Charkow : Zentralverlag, [19??]. - 12 с. : ил.; 13×13 см. - (Kinderfreude; No. 2);
- Gockel H. ... Entstehung der Erde und Naturerscheinungen : Zum Gebrauch in den Dorfzirkeln der Verbände der Atheisten im deutschen Dorfe und für Selbstbildungszwecke / Zusgef. von H. Gockel. - Charkow : Zentral-Verlag der Völker der Union der SSR, Allukrainische Abteilung, 1928. - 30 с. : ил.; 22 см. - (Antireligiöse Bibliothek / Allukrainischer Rat der Verbände der Atheisten; H. 3). - Библиография: с. 29:
- Gockel H. Antireligiöse Bibliothek / Allukrainischer Rat der Verbände der Atheisten. H. 4:, Die Entstehung des Lebens und der Menschen. - 1928
- Gockel H. ... Gott und der Organismus des Menschen : Zum Gebrauche in den Dorfzirkeln der Verbände der Atheisten im deutschen Dorfe und für Selbstbildungszwecke / Zusgef. von H. Gockel. - Charkow : Zentralverlag der Völker der U. der S.S.R., Allukrainische Abteilung, 1928. - 40 с. : ил.; 22 см. - (Antireligiöse Bibliothek / Allukrainischer Rat der Verbände der Atheisten; H. 5). - Библиография: с. 39;
- Gockel H. ... Wie entstand der Glaube? : Zum Gebrauche in den Dorfzirkeln der Verbände der Atheisten im deutschen Dorfe und für Selbstbildungszwecke / Zusgef. von H. Gockel. - Charkow : Zentralverlag der Völker der U. der S.S.R., Allukrainische Abteilung, 1928. - 42, [2] с. : ил.; 22 см. - (Antireligiöse Bibliothek / Allukrainischer Rat der Verbände der Atheisten; H. 7). - Библиография: с. [1];
- Gockel H. ... Der christliche und der nichtchristliche Glaube : Zum Gebrauche in den Dorfzirkeln der Verbände der Atheisten im deutschen Dorfe und für Selbstbildungszwecke / Zusgef. von H. Gockel. - Charkow : Zentralverlag der Völker der U. der S.S.R., Allukrainische Abteilung, 1928. - 46, [1] с. : ил.; 22 см. - (Antireligiöse Bibliothek / Allukrainischer Rat der Verbände der Atheisten; H. 8). - Библиография: с. 46;
- Gockel H. ... Die Entstehung des Christentums (lebte Christus?) : Zum Gebrauche in den Dorfzirkeln der Verbände der Atheisten im deutschen Dorfe und für Selbstbildungszwecke / Zusgef. von H. Gockel. - Charkow : Zentralverlag der Völker der U. der S.S.R., Allukrainische Abteilung, 1929. - 50 с. : ил.; 22 см. - (Antireligiöse Bibliothek / Allukrainischer Rat der Verbände der Atheisten; H. 9). - Библиография: с. 49:
- Gockel H. Die katholische Kirche und der katholische Glaube : Zum Gebrauche in den Dorfzirkeln der Verbände der Gottlosen im deutschen Dorfe und für Selbstbildungszwecke / Zusgef. von H. Gockel. - Charkow : Zentralverlag der Völker der U. der S.S.R., Allukrainische Abteilung, 1929. - 82, [1] с. : ил.; 22 см. - (Antireligiöse Bibliothek / Allukrainischer Rat der Verbände der Atheisten; H. 12). - Библиография: с. 82
- Gockel H. ... Wilde Tiere / Zeichnungen A. Pestun-Dibrowsky; Text H. Gockel. - Charkow : Zentralverlag, [19??]. - 12 с. : ил.; 13×13 см. - (Kinderfreude; No. 2)
- Gockel H. ... Wie die Leute reisen / Zeichnungen G. Din; Text H. Gockel. - Charkow : Zentralverlag, [19??]. - 19 с. : ил.; 10×13 см. - (Kinderfreude; No. 4)
- Gockel H. ... Kulturrevolution / Hans Gockel. - Moskau; Charkow; Pokrowsk: Zentralverlag, Allukr. Abteil., s. a. - 80 S.; 19 см.
- Gockel H. ... Dem kommenden Krieg entgegen / Hans Gockel. - Moskau; Charkow; Pokrowsk: Zentralverlag, Allukrainisches Abteilung, 1931. - 84 S.; 19 см.

== Notes ==
- "DAS NEULAND", antireligiöse Zeitschrift in deutscher Sprache.
- Влада і церква в Україні (перша половина ХХ століття). / Збірник наукових праць. / Укр. асоціація релігієзн.; / Ін-ту філософії ім. Г. С. Сковороди; / Ред. кол. Пащенко В.О. та ін. / Полтава / 2000 / 135 с. / Стр. 117 / ISBN 966-02-1566-5
- Кравченко, П.; Сітарчук, Р. Протестантські об'єднання в Україні у контексті соціальної політики більшовиків 20-30-і роки ХХ століття. / Издательство: Полтава: АСМІ; 212 страниц; 2005 / Стр. 181
- Neuland : antireligiöse Zweiwochenschrift der deutschen Werktätigen.
