= Das Neuland =

Soviet anti-religious magazine (1926–1934)

Neuland
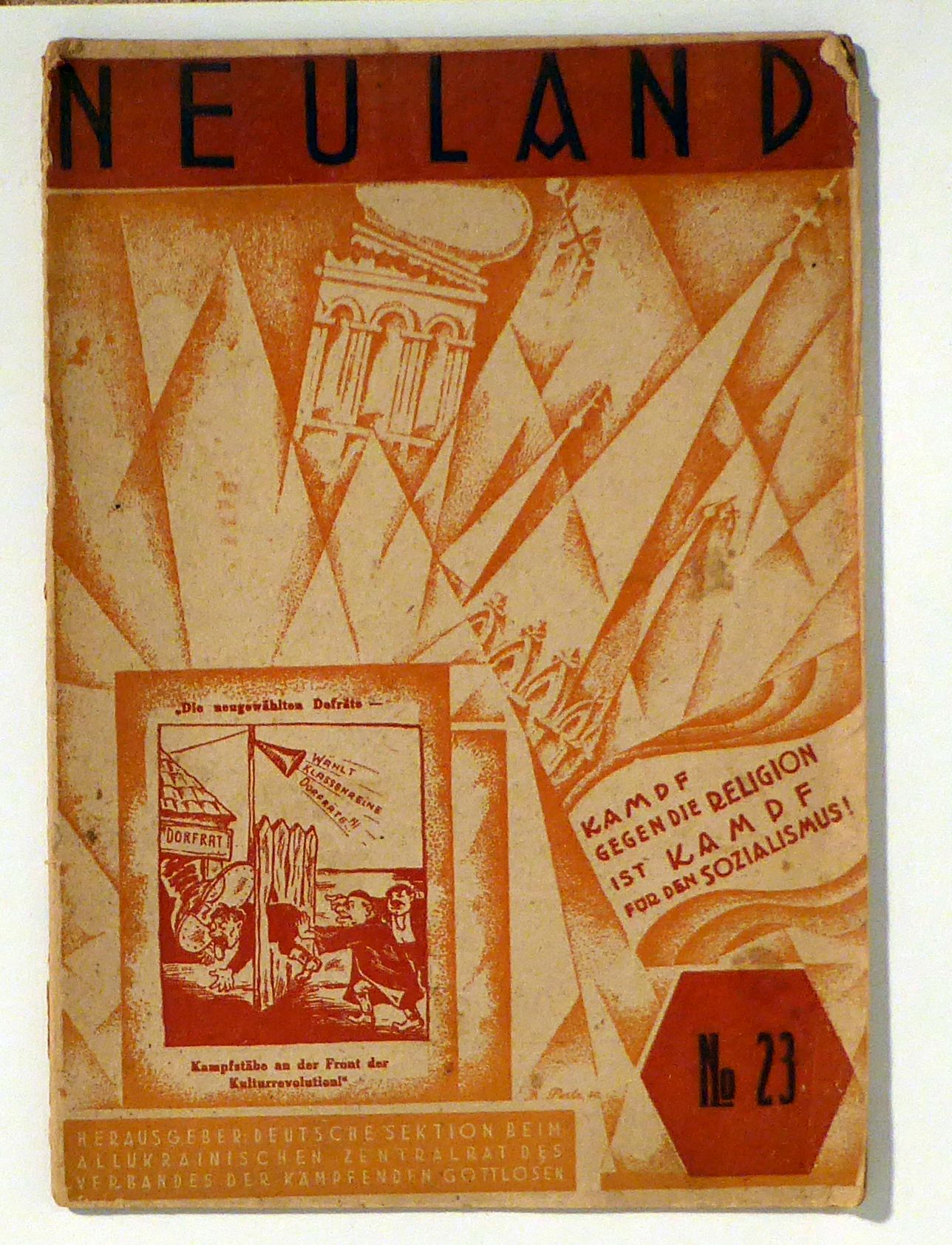
- Cover of the magazine «Neuland» 1930, No. 23.
- Editor: Hans Gockel
- Categories: antireligious
- Frequency: Two times a month / or Monthly
- Founded: November, 1926
- Final issue: December, 1934
- Country: Soviet Union
- Based in: Kharkiv
- Language: German

Neuland: Antireligiöse Zweiwochenschrift der Sowjetdeutschen (Russian: Новь; translation of the name: "The Virgin Land", or "The New Land": "Antireligious two-week publication of the Soviet Germans") was an anti-religious magazine in German. It was published by the Central Bureau of the German Sections at the Central Committee of the Communist Party (Bolsheviks) of Ukraine in the city of Kharkiv. The first issue was published in November 1926, No. 2–11 − in 1927. In the years 1928–1929. 12 were published, in 1930–1933 - 24 issues a year, and in 1934 - 12 issues a year. The subscription price in 1928 was 25 kopeks per month. In 1927 the circulation of the magazine was 457, in 1928 - 1200, in 1929 - 1900, in 1930 - 2400 copies. The publication ceased at No. 12 for 1934. The chief editor of the magazine was Hans Gockel (Johann Gockel-Ehrlich; Russian: Ганс Гансович Гоккель; (1896–1938)) who was subsequently arrested in 1937 and shot in 1938, rehabilitated in 1959. The slogan of the magazine was "The struggle against religion is the struggle for socialism!" (German: «Kampf gegen die Religion ist Kampf für den Sozialismus!»).

== Notes ==
- "DAS NEULAND", antireligiöse Zeitschrift in deutscher Sprache.
- Влада і церква в Україні (перша половина ХХ століття). / Збірник наукових праць. / Укр. асоціація релігієзн.; / Ін-ту філософії ім. Г. С. Сковороди; / Ред. кол. Пащенко В.О. та ін. / Полтава / 2000 / 135 с. / Стр. 117 / ISBN 966-02-1566-5
- Кравченко, П.; Сітарчук, Р. Протестантські об'єднання в Україні у контексті соціальної політики більшовиків 20-30-і роки ХХ століття. / Издательство: Полтава: АСМІ; 212 страниц; 2005 / Стр. 181
- Neuland : antireligiöse Zweiwochenschrift der deutschen Werktätigen.
- Воинствующее безбожие в СССР за 15 лет. 1917-1932 : сборник / Центральный совет Союза воинствующих безбожников и Институт философии Коммунистической академии; под редакцией М. Енишерлова, А. Лукачевского, М. Митина. - Москва : ОГИЗ : Государственное антирелигиозное издательство, 1932. - 525, (2) с. : ил., портр.; 22 см. / С. 331
- T. D. Regehr, Jacob I. Regehr. For Everything a Season: A History of the Alexanderkrone Zentralschule./ CMBC Publications, 1988 / p. 137 ISBN 0920718256
