= Ukhtpechlag =

Soviet Gulag labor camp

Coordinates: 63°34′N 53°42′E

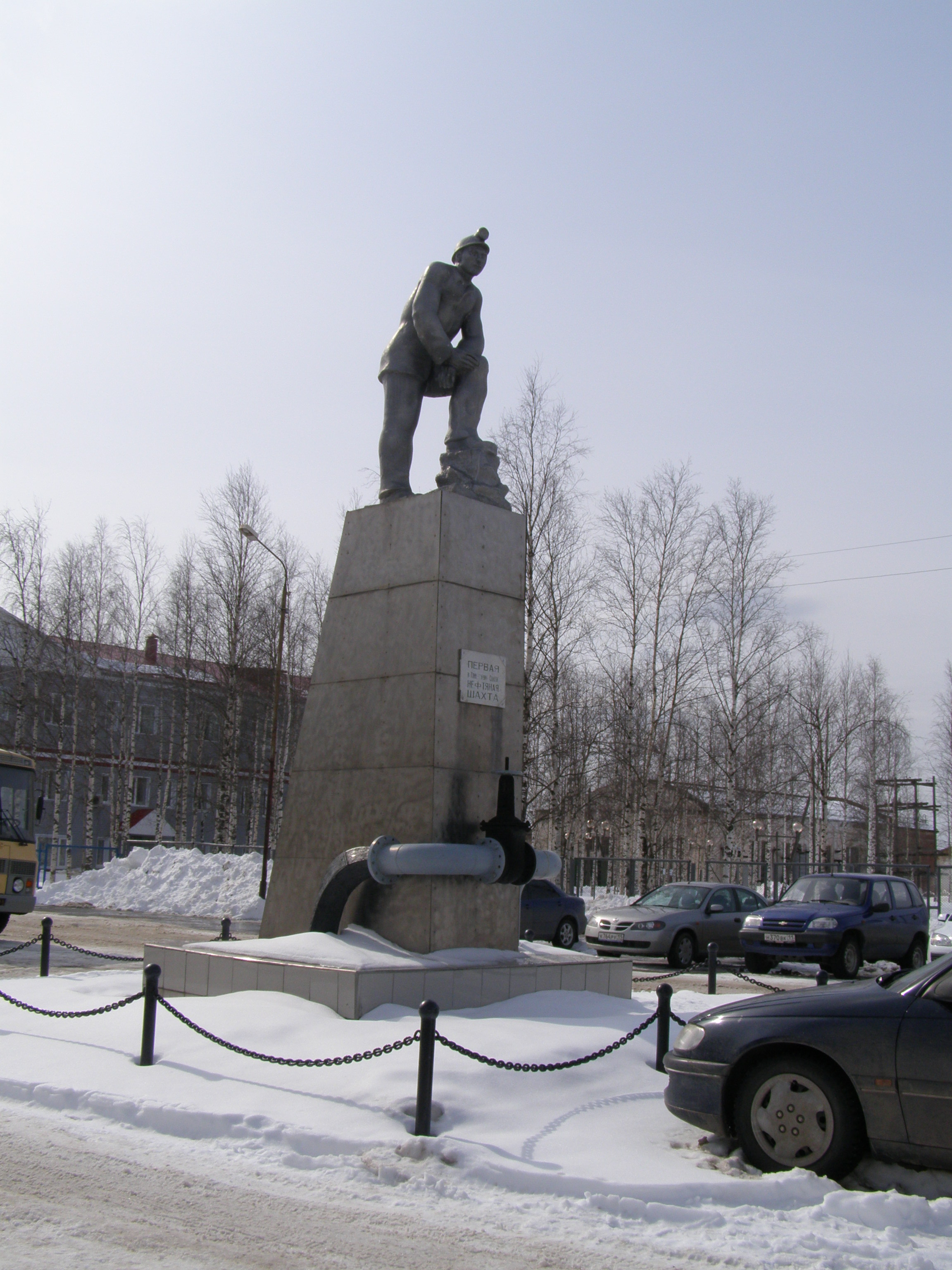
The monument to the first oil mine in Yarega, manned by Ukhtpechlag

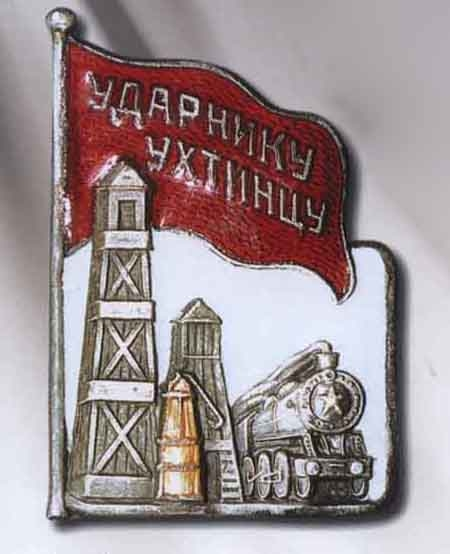
Honorary badge "For an Ukhta Udarnik

The Ukhta–Pechora correctional labor camp (Russian: Ухти́нско-Печо́рский исправи́тельно-трудово́й ла́герь), better known as Ukhtpechlag (Ухтпечла́г) or UPITLag (УПИТЛа́г), was a Gulag labor camp in Komi ASSR. It existed during June 6, 1931 – May 10, 1938. Its headquarters were in Chibyu, now Ukhta. Its main work was oil and coal mining in Ukhta-Pechora Basin, as well as construction works and logging.

In 1938, its subcamps were reorganized into Vorkutlag, Ukhtizhemlag, Sevzheldorlag, Ustvymlag (Устьвымлаг) because of the sharp increase of convicts during the Great Terror.

== Notable inmates ==
- Graal Arelsky (1889–1937), Russian poet of Ego-Futurism, sentenced by Article 58-10 for anti-Soviet propaganda and agitation
- Mikhail Altshuller (1894–1941), economist, professor
- George Andreytchine (1894–1950) Bulgarian, American, and Soviet political activist
- Graal Arelsky (1889–1937), poet-futurist
- Konstantin Avksentevsky (1890–1941), Soviet army commander
- Dmitry Batiev (1896–1941) Komi writer and social activist, one of the founders of Komi (Zyryan) Autonomous Oblast. He suggested the creation of a concentration camp in Ukhta, an himself landed in it as a "creator of the counter-revolutionary nationalist organization". Executed on November 22, 1941.
- Sergey Bigos (1895–1944) Soviet graphic artist, convicted of "counter-revolutionary Trotskyite activities". placed in Ukhtpechlag, later transferred to Ulsollag, where he died of tuberculosis.
- Gleb Bonch-Osmolovsky (1890–1943), Soviet anthropologist, archaeologist, ethnographer, paleoethnologist, and geologist. Convicted for 3 years as part of the "Russian National Party case" (процесс Российской Национальной партии), but released ahead of time.
- Nikolai Bruni (pilot) (1891–1938), Russian pilot, priest, aviation constructor. Convicted in 1935 for 5 years of camps and worked as an artist in Ukhtpechlag. In 1937 he was arrested again and sentenced to death for "counter-revolutionary agitation" (for religious propaganda)
- Olimpia Dobrovolska
- Johann Gockel-Ehrlich
- Nikolai Vasilievich Izmailov (1893–1981); arrested in 1929 in relation to the Academic Trial; worked in the camp as an economist-statistician, released in 1934
- Boris Kozlovsky (1892–1953) Soviet reologist and geophysicist
- Vladislav Kosior (1891–1938), Soviet Bolshevik party functionary; convicted several times for opposition activities and eventually executed
- Kullervo Manner (1880–1939) Finnish and Soviet Communist, politician, and journalist
- Mikhail Nazvanov (1918–1964), Soviet stage and film actor
- Anton Prykhodko
- Sergei Sedov (1908–1937), Soviet engineer and scientist, the son of Leon Trotsky
- Ostap Vyshnya, accused of belonging to the "Ukrainian Military Organization" (Української військової організації (УВО)) and sentenced to execution by firearms, replaced by 10 years of labor camps. He arrived to Uktpechlag on April 18, 1934, where he was engaged in literary work. In 1935 he was transferred from Chibyu to the remote Yedzhid-Kyrt mines (Еджид-Кырта), then in Intalag (Интинский ИТЛ), now Kyrta, Komi Republic). Later he was transferred back to Chibyu. In April 1943 he was transferred to the internal prison of NKVD, Moscow, from which he was released.
