= Konstantin Olimpov =

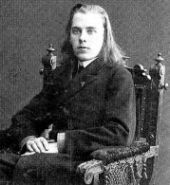
Konstantin Konstantinovich Olimpov

Konstantin Konstantinovich Olimpov (Russian: Константин Константинович Олимпов) (1889–1940) Birth name Konstantin Konstantinovich Fofanov (Russian: Константин Константинович Фофанов)

Konstantin Olimpov was a poet and son of Symbolist poet Konstantin Mikhailovich Fofanov (1862–1911). Along with Igor Severyanin, Olimpov was one of the founding members of Ego-Futurism. A disagreement between Olimpov and Severyanin caused Severyanin to leave the group of Ego-Futurists in the autumn of 1912. He also co-founded The Academy of Ego-Poetry with fellow Ego-Futurists Graal Arelsky.
