= Anatoly Marienhof =

Russian and Soviet writer (1897–1962)

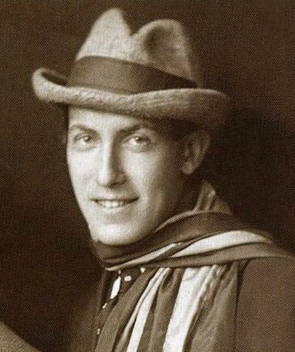
- Marienhof in 1919
- Born: 6 July 1897; Nizhny Novgorod, Russia
- Died: 24 June 1962 (aged 65); Leningrad, Soviet Union
- Occupation: Writer

Anatoly Borisovich Marienhof or Mariengof (Russian: Анато́лий Бори́сович Мариенго́ф; 6 July [O.S. 24 June] 1897 – 24 June 1962) was a Russian poet, novelist, and playwright. He was one of the leading figures of Imaginism. He is remembered mostly for his memoirs depicting Russian literary life in the 1920s and his friendship with Sergei Yesenin.

== Biography ==
Anatoly Marienhof was born on 6 July [O.S. 24 June] 1897 in Nizhny Novgorod, into a Livonian nobleman's family in Nizhny Novgorod. Upon graduating from a gymnasium in 1914, he was drafted and served during the First World War on the Eastern Front.

Marienhof's literary career started in 1918, when he participated in the Imaginists' manifesto "Deklaraciia", published in Voronezh. The manifesto was also signed by Yesenin and other Moscow poets. Together, they started a new movement in poetry known as Imaginism. Marienhof took part in all Imaginist actions and publications and published a dozen books of poetry under his own name between 1920 and 1928. He became a close friend of Yesenin, with whom he shared a flat during some months. Marienhof is the dedicatee of some of Yesenin's major works, including the major poem Sorokoust, the drama Pugachov, and the tract on poetics Maria's Keys.

Marienhof gained further renown with his controversial fiction: "The Novel without Lies" (1926) and "The Cynics" (1928). The former presented his fictionalized (although still largely accurate) recollections of his friendship with Sergei Yesenin; the latter was a story of the life of young intellectuals during the revolution and the War communism. Both were met with sharp criticism in the Soviet press. "The Cynics" was published in Berlin (Petropolis), and would not appear in the Soviet Union until 1988.

After the publication of his last novel, "Shaved Man", in 1930 in Berlin and parts of his historical novel "Ekaterina" (1936), Marienhof was reduced to writing for theatre and later for radio without any hope of being published again. Yesenin's works were edited in the USSR for a long period of time to omit the dedications to Marienhof.

In his later years, after Joseph Stalin's death, Marienhof wrote mostly memoirs; they were published several decades after his death in Komarovo, within Leningrad, on 24 June 1962.

== English translations ==
- Cynics, (Novel), Hyperion Press, 1973.
- A Novel Without Lies, (Memoir), Glas, 2000.

== Literature ==
- Tomi Huttunen. Imazhinist Mariengof: Dandy. Montage. Cynics. Moscow: Novoe Literaturnoe Obozrenie. 2007.

== Sources ==
- Kahn, Andrew; Lipovetsky, Mark Naumovich; Reyfman, Irina; Sandler, Stephanie (2018). A History of Russian Literature. Oxford University Press. ISBN 978-0-19-966394-1.
- McVay, Gordon (2 December 2013). "Anatolii Borisovich Mariengof". In Cornwell, Neil (ed.). Reference Guide to Russian Literature. Routledge. pp. 540–542. ISBN 978-1-134-26070-6.
