= Konstantinovo, Rybnovsky District, Ryazan Oblast =

Konstantinovo Константиново
- Village
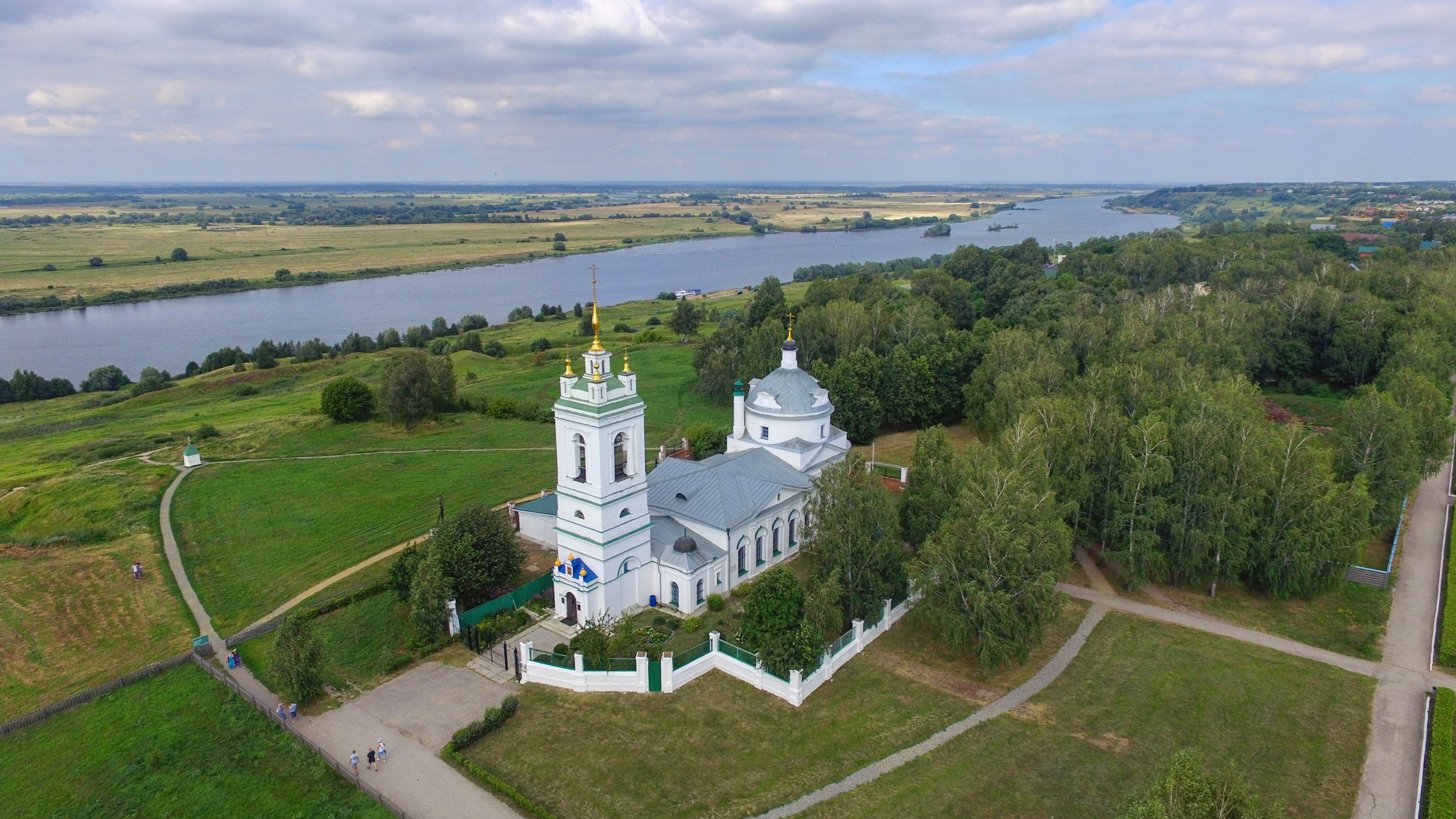

- Location within Ryazan Oblast Location within Russia
- Coordinates: 54°51′N 39°36′E
- Country: Russia
- Region: Ryazan Oblast
- District: Rybnovsky District
- Time zone: UTC+3:00

Konstantinovo (Russian: Константиново) is a rural locality (a village) in Kuzminsky Rural Settlement, Rybnovsky District, Ryazan Oblast, Russia. Population: 359 (2010 census); 369 (2002 census);

Konstantinovo is known for being the birthplace of poet Sergei Yesenin.

== Demographics ==
Konstantinovo had a population of 369 in 2002 and 359 in 2010.
