= Ryazansky Uyezd =

Subdivision of the Ryazan Governorate of the Russian Empire

Ryazansky Uyezd (Рязанский уезд) was one of the administrative subdivisions of the Ryazan Governorate within the Russian Empire. It was situated in the northern part of the governorate, and its administrative center was Ryazan.

== Demographics ==
According to the Russian Empire Census of 1897, Ryazansky Uyezd had a population of 212,683. Of these, 98.6% spoke Russian, 0.4% spoke Polish, 0.4% spoke Ukrainian, 0.3% spoke Yiddish, 0.1% spoke German, and 0.1% spoke Tatar as their native language.
