= Konstantinovo, Gryazovetsky District, Vologda Oblast =

Konstantinovo Константиново
- Village
- Location within Vologda Oblast Location within Russia
- Coordinates: 58°52′N 40°44′E
- Country: Russia
- Region: Vologda Oblast
- District: Gryazovetsky District
- Time zone: UTC+3:00

Konstantinovo (Russian: Константиново) is a rural locality (a village) in Sidorovskoye Rural Settlement, Gryazovetsky District, Vologda Oblast, Russia. The population was 4 as of 2002.

== Geography ==
Konstantinovo is located 32 km (20 mi) east of Gryazovets (the district's administrative centre) by road. Podolnoye is the nearest rural locality.
