= Konstantinovo, Gus-Khrustalny District, Vladimir Oblast =

Konstantinovo Константиново
- Village
- Location within Vladimir Oblast Location within Russia
- Coordinates: 55°32′N 41°01′E
- Country: Russia
- Region: Vladimir Oblast
- District: Gus-Khrustalny District
- Time zone: UTC+3:00

Konstantinovo (Russian: Константи́ново) is a rural locality (a village) in Grigoryevskoye Rural Settlement, Gus-Khrustalny District, Vladimir Oblast, Russia. The population was 109 as of 2010.

== Geography ==
Konstantinovo is located 40 km southeast of Gus-Khrustalny (the district's administrative centre) by road. Zakolpye is the nearest rural locality.
