= Konstantin Fofanov =

Russian poet

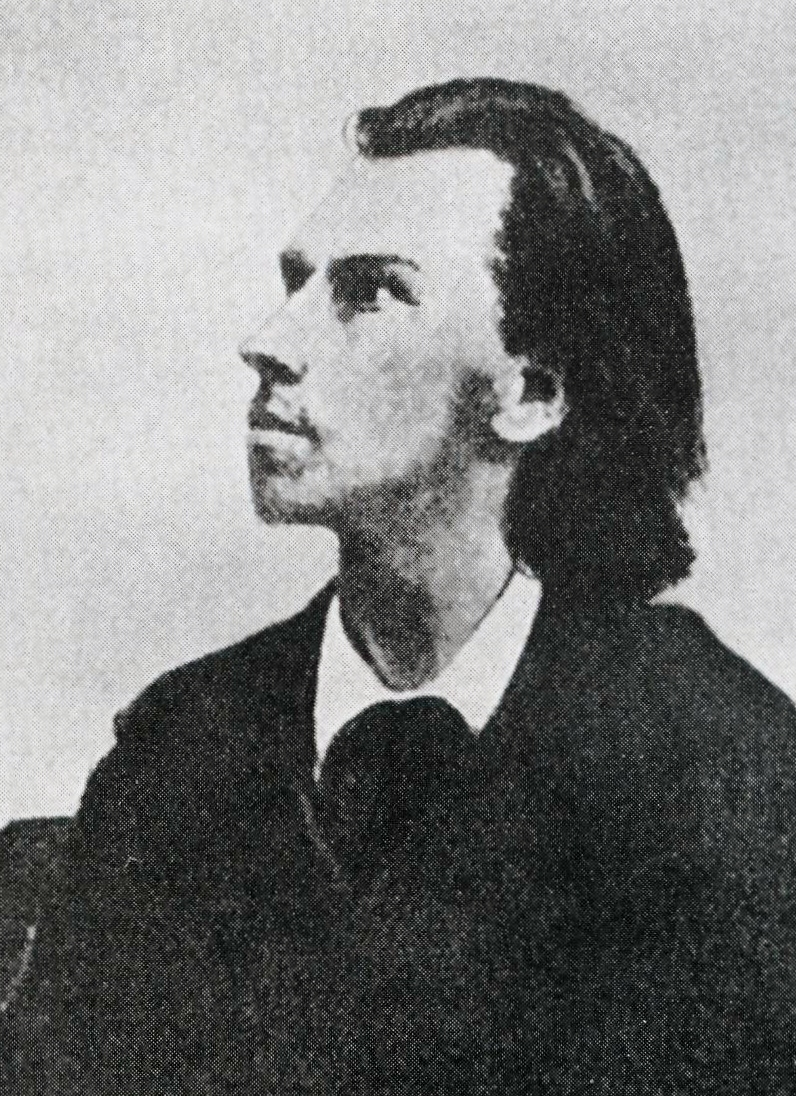
- Born: May 30, 1862; St Petersburg, Russia
- Died: May 30, 1911 (aged 49); St Petersburg, Russia
- Children: Konstantin Olimpov

Konstantin Mikhailovich Fofanov (Russian: Константи́н Миха́йлович Фо́фанов, IPA: [kənstɐnʲˈtʲin mʲɪˈxajləvʲɪtɕ ˈfofənəf]; May 30, 1862 – May 30, 1911) was a Russian poet.

== Biography ==
Konstantin was born into a family of St. Petersburg merchants. His father had been born a peasant, but had risen to the merchant class through the selling of firewood. Konstantin was one of ten children. At the age of six he began attending a primary school. He later attended the cheap private Aimee and Kestner pensions, as well as the St. Petersburg city school, but left before completing the second form after his father went bankrupt and became a mystic. As a result, Konstantin didn't receive a formal education. He made up for his lack of education by the constant reading of magazines and books, sometimes messy, but extremely diverse. His reading was clearly on an ad hoc basis, but he was fascinated by books, becoming addicted to poetry at the age of thirteen, and beginning to write his own verses.

He made his debut in print in 1881. He published poems in the illustrated weeklies, and in the newspaper New Times, run by Aleksey Suvorin. After the success of his first collection Poems (1887), Suvorin issued a second book of poetry by Fofanov with the same title in 1889. After this Fofanov published Shadows and Mystery (1892), a novella in verse The Baron Clasco (1892) and Poems (in five parts, 1896).

In general, the period from the mid-1880s to the mid-1890s in the history of Russian poetry, is often called "Fofanovism" because the poetry of Fofanov had the support of popular sentiment, found a wide response from readers and provoked much imitation. His talent was praised by fellow poets Yakov Polonsky and Apollon Maykov and writers such as Leo Tolstoy and Nikolai Leskov.

Fofanov is considered to be a precursor of the Symbolists.

Fofanov was an alcoholic, and in the early 1890s suffered from a severe mental illness. The last ten years of his life were spent in poverty and drunkenness. He continued to write, but published only a collection of poems Illusions (1900), a poem in octaves Uncommon Romance and the poem After Calvary (1910).
