= Igor Severyanin =

Russian poet

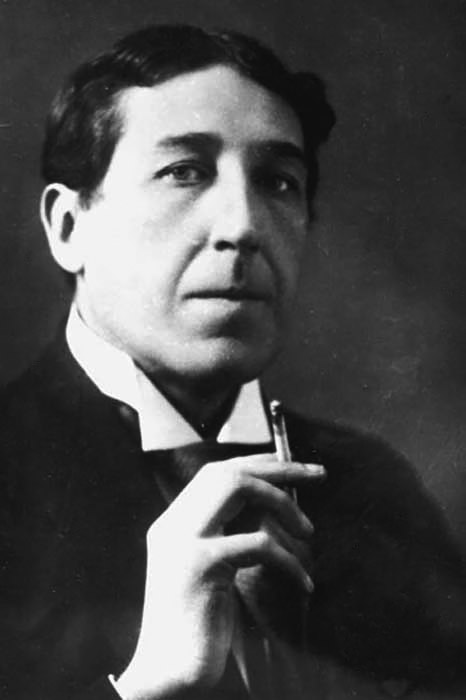
Igor Severyanin

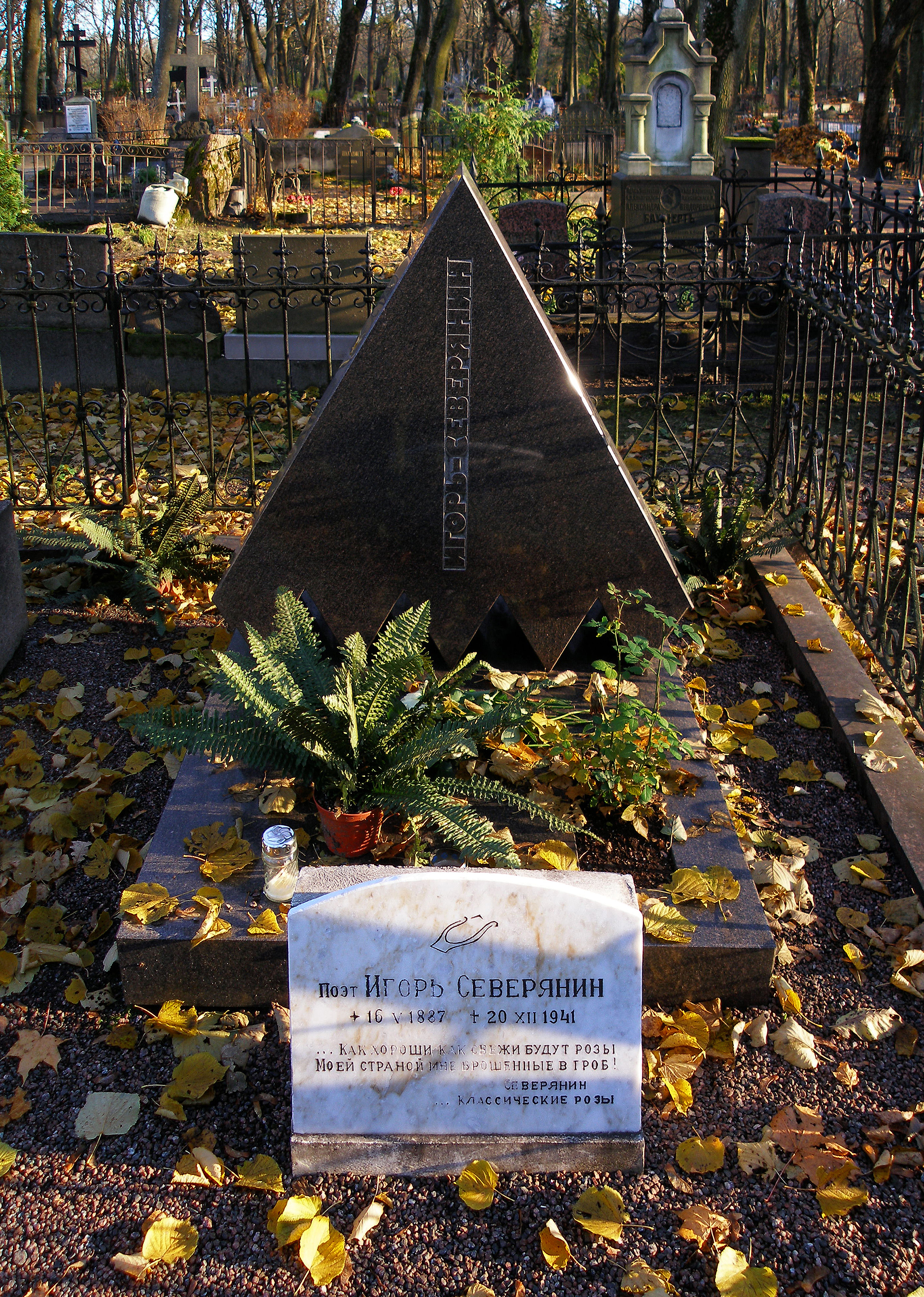
Grave of Severyanin in Tallinn

Igor Severyanin (Russian: И́горь Северя́нин; pen name, real name Igor Vasilyevich Lotaryov: И́горь Васи́льевич Лотарёв; May 16, 1887 – December 20, 1941) was a Russian poet who presided over the circle of the so-called Ego-Futurists.

Igor was born in St. Petersburg in the family of an army engineer. Through his mother, he was remotely related to Nikolai Karamzin and Afanasy Fet. In 1904 he left for Harbin with his father but later returned to St. Petersburg to publish first poems at his own expense. It was not until 1913 that, in the words of D.S. Mirsky, "the moment came when vulgarity claimed a place on Parnassus and issued its declaration of rights in the verse of Igor Severyanin". That year, Severyanin (his pen name means "Northerner" in Russian) brought out a collection entitled The Cup of Thunder (Громокипящий кубок), with a preface written by Fyodor Sologub.

In one of his most celebrated poems, Lotaryov introduced himself to the readers with the following words: "I am Igor Severyanin, a genius!" He soon gained a cult following, especially in the provinces of Imperial Russia. The poet "captured the popular imagination and reached stardom with his slick pomaded hair parted in the middle; his melancholy, darkly circled eyes; his impeccable tails; and an ever-present lily in his hands".

Severyanin's poems treated such extraordinary themes as "ice cream of lilacs" and "pineapples in champagne", intending to overwhelm the bourgeois audience with a riot of colors and glamour associated by them with high society. In his verse, Severyanin admired dirigibles and automobiles, everything that could convey to his followers the notion of modernity. He would often shock the public by professing his admiration for Oscar Wilde or scandalize his emulators with cynical statements and megalomania. During one party, they declared Severyanin "the king of poets", although some respected critics professed their distaste for his work.

After the Russian Revolution of 1917, Severyanin was one of the first poets to leave Russia. Having settled in Estonia in 1918, he tried to return to Russia afterwards, but could not for various reasons (namely, the civil war, his marriage to a local woman (Felissa Kruut), unreceptive literary climate in Soviet Russia, etc.). After the Soviet occupation of Estonia, 1940 Severyanin continued literary activities, and later died of a heart attack in the German occupied Tallinn in 1941. He was buried in Alexander Nevsky cemetery, Tallinn.
