= List of Russian-language poets =

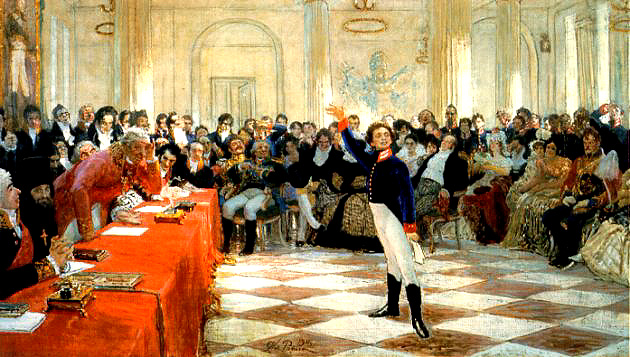
Pushkin Reciting His Poem Before Old Derzhavin, a painting by Ilya Repin, 1911

This is a list of authors who have written poetry in the Russian language.

== Alphabetical list ==
=== A ===
Portrait	Person	Notable works
	Bella Akhmadulina (1937–2010)	The String; The Garden; A Guiding Sound; Once in December
	Anna Akhmatova (1889–1966)	Evening; Requiem; The Rosary; Poem Without a Hero
	Margarita Aliger (1915–1992)	Zoya; Railroad; The Year of Birth; Stones and Grass
	Daniil Andreev (1906–1959)	Russian Gods; The Iron Mystery
	Domna Anisimova (fl. 19th century)	Depiction of the Harvest; Sound of the Night Wind
	Innokenty Annensky (1855–1909)	Quiet Songs; Cypress Box
	Pavel Antokolsky (1896–1978)	All We Who in His Name
	Aleksey Apukhtin (1840–1893)	
	Eduard Asadov (1923–2004)	
	Nikolay Aseyev (1889–1963)	Zor; Night Flute
	Lera Auerbach (born 1973)	
	Gennadiy Aygi (1934–2006)	

=== B ===
Portrait	Person	Notable works
	Eduard Bagritsky (1895–1934)	February
	Konstantin Balmont (1867–1942)	Under the Northern Sky; Let Us Be Like the Sun; Burning Buildings
	Jurgis Baltrušaitis (1873–1944)	
	Evgeny Baratynsky (1800–1844)	Eda; The Gypsy; The Last Poet; Autumn
	Ivan Barkov (1732–1768)	obscene poems
	Anna Barkova (1901–1976)	Tatar Anguish
	Agniya Barto (1906–1981)	Toys; Mishka the Petty Thief
	Alexander Bashlachev (1960–1988)	
	Konstantin Batyushkov (1787–1855)	
	Demyan Bedny (1883–1945)	
	Andrey Bely (1880–1934)	Urn; Gold in Azure; Christ Has Risen; The First Encounter
	Olga Bergholz (1910–1975)	February Diary; Leningrad Poem
	Aleksandr Bestuzhev (1797–1837)	
	Alexander Blok (1880–1921)	Skify; The Twelve
	Valeri Brainin-Passek (born 1948)	
	Joseph Brodsky (1940–1996)	
	Valery Bryusov (1873–1924)	Tertia Vigilia
	Ivan Bunin (1870–1953)	Falling Leaves
	Anna Bunina (1774–1829)	Though Poverty's No Stain

=== C ===
Portrait	Person	Notable works
	Sasha Chorny (1880–1932)	
	Korney Chukovsky (1882–1969)	Category:Works by Korney Chukovsky
	Georgy Chulkov (1879–1939)	

=== D ===
Portrait	Person	Notable works
	Denis Davydov (1784–1839)	
	Anton Delvig (1798–1831)	
	Andrey Dementyev (1928–2018)	
	Regina Derieva (1949–2013)	
	Gavrila Derzhavin (1743–1816)	
	Nikolai Devitte (1811–1844)	Not for Me
	Ivan Dmitriev (1760–1837)	
	Nikolay Dobrolyubov (1836–1861)	
	Yevgeniy Dolmatovsky (1915–1994)	
	Spiridon Drozhzhin (1848–1930)	
	Yulia Drunina (1924–1991)	
	Xenia Dyakonova (born 1985)	Моя жизнь без меня Каникулы

=== E ===
Portrait	Person	Notable works
	Ilya Ehrenburg (1891–1967)	

=== F ===
Portrait	Person	Notable works
	Afanasy Fet (1812–1892)	
	Konstantin Fofanov (1862–1911)	

=== G ===
Portrait	Person	Notable works
	Cherubina de Gabriak (1887–1928)	
	Alexander Galich (1918–1977)	Clouds; Kaddish; The Night Watch; When I Return
	Aleksei Gastev (1882–1939)	
	Mikhail Gerasimov (1889–1939)	
	Zinaida Gippius (1869–1945)	
	Nikolay Glazkov (1919–1979)	
	Avdotia Glinka (1795–1863)	
	Fyodor Glinka (1786–1880)	
	Nikolay Gnedich (1784–1833)	The Fishers
	Arseny Golenishchev-Kutuzov (1848–1913)	
	Dmitry Gorchakov (1758–1824)	
	Sergey Gorodetsky (1884–1967)	
	Boris Golovin (born 1955)	
	Aleksandr Griboedov (1794–1829)	Woe from Wit
	Apollon Grigoryev (1822–1864)	
	Oleg Grigoryev (1943–1992)	
	Isabella Grinevskaya (1864–1944)	
	Igor Guberman (born 1936)	
	Semyon Gudzenko (1922–1953)	
	Nikolay Gumilyov (1886–1921)	
	Elena Guro (1877–1913)	

=== I ===
Portrait	Person	Notable works
	Vera Inber (1890–1972)	
	Mikhail Isakovsky (1900–1973)	
	Georgy Ivanov (1894–1958)	
	Vyacheslav Ivanov (1866–1949)	
	Ryurik Ivnev (1891–1981)	
	Alexander Izmaylov (1779–1831)	

=== K ===
Portrait	Person	Notable works
	Gavril Kamenev (1772–1803)	
	Antiochus Kantemir (1708–1744)	
	Vasily Kapnist (1758–1823)	
align=center	Rimma Kazakova (1932–2008)	
	Dmitri Kedrin (1907–1945)	
	Bakhyt Kenjeev (born 1950)	
	Daniil Kharms (1905–1942)	
	Ivan Khemnitser (1745–1784)	
	Velemir Khlebnikov (1885–1922)	
	Vladislav Khodasevich (1886–1939)	
	Aleksey Khomyakov (1804–1860)	
	Apollon Korinfsky (1868–1937)	Songs of the Heart; Black Roses
	Lidiya Khaindrova (1910–1986)	
	Dmitry Khvostov (1757–1835)	
	Semyon Kirsanov (1906–1972)	
	Nikolai Klyuev (1884–1937)	
	Ekaterina Kniazhnina (1746–1797)	
	Pavel Kogan (1918–1942)	
	Aleksey Koltsov (1809–1842)	
	Nahum Korzhavin (1925–2018)	
	Ivan Kozlov (1779–1840)	
	Vasili Krasovsky (1782–1824)	
	Aleksey Kruchenykh (1886–1968)	
	Ivan Krylov (1769–1844)	
	Yuri Kublanovsky (born 1947)	
	Wilhelm Küchelbecher (1797–1846)	
	Anatoly Kudryavitsky (born 1954)	
	Nestor Kukolnik (1809–1868)	
	Alexander Kushner (born 1936)	
	Dmitry Kuzmin (born 1969)	
	Mikhail Kuzmin (1872–1936)	

=== L ===
Portrait	Person	Notable works
	Vasily Lebedev-Kumach (1898–1949)	
	Mikhail Lermontov (1814–1841)	Borodino; The Song of the Merchant Kalashnikov; Demon; Valerik; Death of the Poet
	Mirra Lokhvitskaya (1869–1905)	
	Yegor Letov (1964–2008)	
	Mikhail Lomonosov (1711–1765)	
	Vladimir Lugovskoy (1901–1957)	

=== M ===
Portrait	Person	Notable works
	Osip Mandelstam (1891–1938)	Stalin Epigram
	Anatoly Marienhof (1897–1962)	
	Maria Markova (born 1982)	
	Samuil Marshak (1887–1964)	
	Vladimir Mayakovsky (1893–1930)	A Cloud in Trousers; Backbone Flute; Mystery-Bouffe
	Apollon Maykov (1821–1897)	
	Dmitriy Merezhkovsky (1866–1941)	
	Aleksey Merzlyakov (1778–1830)	
	Arvo Mets (1937–1997)	
	Lev Mei (1822–1862)	
	Alexander Mezhirov (1923–2009)	
	Sergey Mikhalkov (1913–2009)	
	Fyodor Miller (1818–1881)	
	Nikolai Minsky (1855–1937)	
	Yunna Morits (born 1937)	

=== N ===
Portrait	Person	Notable works
	Vladimir Nabokov (1899–1977)	
	Semyon Nadson (1862–1887)	
	Vladimir Narbut (1888–1938)	
	Sergey Narovchatov (1919–1981)	
	Nikolay Nekrasov (1821–1877)	
	Ivan Savvich Nikitin (1824–1861)	

=== O ===
Portrait	Person	Notable works
	Alexander Odoevsky (1802–1839)	The Ball
	Nikolay Ogarev (1813–1877)	
	Irina Odoyevtseva (1895–1990)	
	Bulat Okudzhava (1924–1997)	
	Nikolay Oleynikov (1898–1937)	The Carp; Cockroach; The Beetle

=== P ===
Portrait	Person	Notable works
	Liodor Palmin (1841–1891)	
	Valentin Parnakh (1891–1951)	
	Sophia Parnok (1885–1933)	
	Boris Pasternak (1890–1960)	
	Karolina Pavlova (1807–1893)	
	Vladimir Pecherin (1807–1885)	
	Mariya Petrovykh (1908–1979)	
	Aleksey Plescheev (1825–1893)	
	Pyotr Pletnyov (1792–1866)	
	Elizaveta Polonskaya (1890–1969)	
	Yakov Polonsky (1819–1898)	
	Nikolay Popovsky (1730–1760)	
	Vasili Popugaev (1778 or 1779 – c. 1816)	
	Alexander Prokofyev (1900–1971)	
	Kozma Prutkov (1817–1875)	
	Alexander Pushkin (1799–1837)	Eugene Onegin, The Bronze Horseman, Boris Godunov (play)
	Vasily Pushkin (1766–1830)	

=== R ===
Portrait	Person	Notable works
	Leonid Radin (1860–1900)	«Смело, товарищи, в ногу!» (1896), popular Russian revolutionary song
	Vladimir Raevsky (1795–1872)	
	Anna Radlova (1891–1949)	
	Irina Ratushinskaya (1954–2017)	
	Yevgeny Rein (born 1935)	
	Yevdokiya Rostopchina (1812–1858)	
	Konstantin Romanov (K.R.) (1858–1915)	
	Vsevolod Rozhdestvensky (1895–1977)	
align=center	Robert Rozhdestvensky (1932–1994)	
	Nikolay Rubtsov (1936–1971)	
	Kondraty Ryleyev (1795–1826)	
	Boris Ryzhy(1974–2001)	Opravdaniye zhizni

=== S ===
Portrait	Person	Notable works
	David Samoylov (1920–1990)	
	Genrikh Sapgir (1928–1999)	
	Feodosy Savinov (1865–1915)	Rodnoye
	Mikhail Savoyarov (1876–1941)	
	Olga Sedakova (born 1949)	
	Ilya Selvinsky (1899–1968)	
	Andrei Sen-Senkov (born 1968)	
	Daria Serenko (born 1993)	
	Igor Severyanin (1887–1941)	
	Varlam Shalamov (1907–1982)	
	Tatiana Shchepkina-Kupernik (1874–1952)	
	Stepan Shchipachev (1889–1980)	
	Vadim Shefner (1915–2002)	
	Nikolay Sherbina (1821–1869)	
	Elena Shirman (1908–1942)	
	Vadim Shershenevich (1893–1942)	
	Stepan Shevyryov (1806–1864)	
	Maria Shkapskaya (1891–1952)	No Dream
	Gennady Shpalikov (1937–1974)	
	Konstantin Simonov (1915–1979)	Wait for Me
	Stepan Skitalets (1869–1941)	
	Konstantin Sluchevsky (1837–1904)	
	Boris Slutsky (1919–1986)	
	Fyodor Sologub (1863–1927)	
	Vladimir Soloukhin (1924–1997)	
	Vladimir Solovyov (1853–1900)	
	Alexander Sumarokov (1717–1777)	
	Ivan Surikov (1841–1880)	Rowan; Steppe
	Fyodor Svarovsky (born 1971)	
	Mikhail Svetlov (1903–1964)	

=== T ===
Portrait	Person	Notable works
	Yelizaveta Tarakhovskaya (1891–1968)	
	Arseny Tarkovsky (1907–1989)	
	Nikolay Tikhonov (1896–1979)	
	Aleksey Tolstoy (1817–1875)	
	Vasily Trediakovsky (1703–1769)	
	Pyotr Nikolayevich Toburokov (1917–2001)	
	Marina Tsvetaeva (1892–1941)	
	Nika Turbina (1974–2002)	
	Ivan Turgenev (1818–1883)	
	Veronika Tushnova (1915–1965)	Memory of the Heart
	Aleksandr Tvardovsky (1910–1971)	
	Fyodor Tyutchev (1803–1873)	

=== U ===
Portrait	Person	Notable works
	Vladimir Uflyand (1937–2007)	
	Joseph Utkin (1903–1944)	The Story About Ginger Motele; Mr. Inspector; Rabbi Isaiah and Commissar Bloch

=== V ===
Portrait	Person	Notable works
	Konstantin Vaginov (1899–1934)	
	Dmitry Venevitinov (1805–1827)	
	Igor Vishnevetsky (born 1964)	
	Dmitry Vodennikov (born 1968)	
	Anri Volokhonsky (1936–2017)	
	Maksimilian Voloshin (1877–1932)	
	Andrey Voznesensky (1933–2010)	
	Alexander Vvedensky (1904–1941)	
	Pyotr Vyazemsky (1792–1878)	
	Vladimir Vysotsky (1938–1980)	

=== Y ===
Portrait	Person	Notable works
	Pyotr Yakubovich (1860–1911)	
	Alexander Yashin (1913–1968)	
	Nikolay Yazykov (1803–1847)	
	Pyotr Yershov (1815–1869)	The Humpbacked Horse
	Sergey Yesenin (1895–1925)	
	Yevgeny Yevtushenko (1933–2017)	

=== Z ===
Portrait	Person	Notable works
	Nikolay Zabolotsky (1903–1958)	
	Boris Zakhoder (1918–2000)	
	Vsevolod Zelchenko (born 1972)	
	Yulia Zhadovskaya (1824–1883)	
	Aleksey Zhemchuzhnikov (1821–1908)	
	Vasily Zhukovsky (1783–1852)	

== See also ==
- List of Russian architects
- List of Russian artists
- List of Russian explorers
- List of Russian inventors
- List of Russian-language novelists
- List of Russian-language playwrights
- List of Russian-language writers
- Russian culture
- Russian poetry
- Russian literature
- Russian language
- Category:Russian poets

== Sources ==
- Greene, Roland; et al., eds. (2012). "Poetry of Russia". The Princeton Encyclopedia of Poetry and Poetics (4th rev. ed.). Princeton, NJ: Princeton University Press. ISBN 978-0-691-15491-6.
- Wachtel, Michael (2004). The Cambridge Introduction to Russian Poetry. Cambridge Introductions to Literature. Cambridge University Press. ISBN 0-521-00493-4.
