= Larisa Zhadova =

Soviet art critic and historian (1927-1981)

Larisa Alekseevna Zhadova (born Zhidova; August 13, 1927 – December 9, 1981) was a Soviet art critic, art and design historian, specialized on Russian avant-garde. She is the author of the first monograph about Vladimir Tatlin. Daughter of the Soviet military leader Alexei Zhadov, she was the wife and widow of the poet Semyon Gudzenko as well as the fourth and last wife of the poet and writer Konstantin Simonov. Thanks in large part to Zhadova, who acted through her husband, the influential literary functionary Konstantin Simonov, the Russian avant-garde, while being subject of a general ban, in the 1970s was partially recovered for Soviet culture and scientific research.

== Biography ==
Larisa Zhidova was born on August 13, 1927, in Tver into the family of the later Soviet Red Army general Alexei Zhidov. In 1942, her father changed his family name from Zhidov, which indicated Jewish origin, to Zhadov.

From 1945 to 1950, Zhadova studied at the department of art history of the philological faculty of the Lomonosov State University of Moscow. In 1950, she started the postgraduate course of the department of the history of foreign art at the same institution. In 1954, she defended her PhD-thesis on the topic "Development of realism in Czech painting of the XIX century". While studying at Moscow State University, Zhadova met the poet Semyon Gudzenko, who studied there, and they soon married. Due to the Jewish origin of his son-in-law, Aleksey Zhadov completely refused his daughter financial support. After the birth of their daughter Katya in 1951, the family's situation became completely disastrous. Suffering from war wounds and barely earning money as journalist, Gudzenko died in 1953, of a brain tumor. After two brain surgeries, anticipating his imminent death, Gudzenko instructed his closest friend, journalist Arkady Galinsky, to take care of his widow after his death. Galinsky subsequently arranged the liaison of Zhadova with the editor-in-chief of Literaturnaya Gazeta, Konstantin Simonov, whom she married in 1955. Simonov adopted Zhadova's daughter Katya, giving her his patronymic and surname, and in 1957 a second daughter, Sasha, was born. Simonov, who had separated from Valentina Serova due to his liaison with Zhadova, brought their daughter Masha into his family.

Since 1954, Zhadova worked at Moscow State University, since 1958 at the Academy of Sciences of the Uzbek SSR. From 1960 she had a position at the Institute of Theory and History of Fine Arts (ITII) of the Academy of Arts of the USSR, from 1966 until the end of her life at the All-Union Scientific Research Institute of Technical Aesthetics (VNIITE), in the Central Educational and Experimental Studio of the Union of Artists of the USSR.

Zhadova died on December 9, 1981, in Moscow, at the age of fifty-four. Her ashes were scattered by her daughters in Buinichskoe Pole near Mogilev in Belarus.

== Research and publications ==
Zhadova's articles on Western designers like Mario Bellini, Ettore Sottsass and Tomás Maldonado greatly influenced the formation of a new generation of Soviet designers in the 1960s. Her book "Monumental Painting in Mexico" (Russian: "Монументальная живопись Мексики"), published in 1965, played a key role in mediating the expression means of Mexican Muralists to Sovjet decorative artists like Zurab Tsereteli. Since the late 1960s, Zhadova focused on the study of the Russian avant-garde. A breakthrough was her monograph "Search and Experiment. Russian and Soviet Art in the between 1910 and 1930" (German: "Suche und Experiment. Aus der Geschichte der russischen und sowjetischen Kunst zwischen 1910 und 1930"), published in 1978, in Dresden. In this book, Zhadova explored aspects of the work of Kasimir Malevitch, Boris Ender, Nikolai Suetin, Anna Leporskaya, Lyubov Popova, Mikhail Matyushin and other artists. Zhadova played a key role in the rediscovery of the work of Vladimir Tatlin, formerly banned, in the late 1970s, taking advantage of the influence of her husband who was chairman of the board of the USSR Writers' Union. In 1977, an exhibition of Tatlin's work, initiated by her and organized by the USSR Writers' Union, the USSR Artists Union and the Central State Archives of Literature and Art, was held in the A.A. Fadeev Central House of Writers. However, the monograph "Tatlin" prepared by Zhadova did not receive permission for publication in the USSR and was published after the author's death in 1983 in Hungarian by the Corvina publishing house in Budapest. In 1984, Zhadova's book about Tatlin was also published in German and English and finally, in 1990, in French.

== Bibliography ==
- Sovremennaya zhivopis' Uzbekistana [Contemporary painting of Uzbekistan], Tashkent : Gosudarstvennoye izdatel'stvo khudozhestvennoy literatury, 1962.
- Sovremennai︠a︡ keramika Uzbekistana [Contemporary ceramics of Uzbekistan], Moskva : Iskusstvo, 1963, OCLC 25420832.
- Monumental'naya zhivopis' Meksiki [Monumental painting of Mexico], Moskva : Iskusstvo, 1965.
- Fernand Léger, Moskva : Iskusstvo, 1970.
- with: I. Alpatova, N. Voronov, Iskusstvo keramiki [The art of ceramics], Moskva : Sovetskiy khudozhnik, 1970.
- with: G. Derviz, I. Zhdanko, D. Mitlyanskiy, Sovremennaya keramika narodnykh masterov Sredney Azii [Contemporary ceramics of folk craftsmen of Central Asia], Moskva : Sovetskiy khudozhnik, 1974.
- Opyt raboty Tsentral'noy uchebno-eksperimental'noy studii khudozhestvennogo proyektirovaniya na Senezhe [Work experience of the Central Educational and Experimental Studio of Artistic Design in Senezh] (with a preface by Larisa Zhadova), Moskva : Iskusstvo (Искусство), 1974.
- V.E. Tatlin. Zasluzhennyĭ dei︠a︡telʹ iskusstv RSFSR 1885-1953 : katalog vystavki proizvedeniĭ, Moskva : Izd-vo Sovetskiĭ khudozhnik, 1977.
- Suche und Experiment. Aus der Geschichte der russischen und sowjetischen Kunst zwischen 1910 und 1930, Dresden : VEB Verlag der Kunst, 1978.
- with: Krystyna Gmurzynska, Szymon Bojko, John E. Bowlt, Ludmila Vachtova, Erika Hoffmann-Koenige, Larissa Zhadova, Jacques Lassaigne, Alla Povelikhina, Evgeni Kovtun, Jean-Claude Marcadé, Dmitry Sarabyanov, Mary Chamot, Vasily Rakitin, and Hubertus Gaßner, Künstlerinnen der russischen Avantgarde / Women-Artists of the Russian Avantgarde 1910 – 1930, Cologne 1979.
- Poszukiwania i eksperymenty. Z dziejów sztuki rosyjskiej i radzieckiej lat 1910-1930 [Research and experiments. From the history of Russian and Soviet art in 1910-1930], Warszawa : Wydawnictwa Artystyczne i Filmowe, 1982.
- Malevich : suprematism and revolution in Russian art 1910-1930, New York : Thames and Hudson, 1982.
- Malewitsch Kasimir Malewitsch und sein Kreis. Suche und Experiment. Aus der Geschichte der russischen und sowjetischen Kunst zwischen 1910 und 1930, München : Schirmer Mosel, 1982.
- Tatlin, Budapest : Corvina Kiadó, 1984.
- with: S.G. Karaganova, E.A. Katseva, Konstantin Simonov v vospominanii︠a︡kh sovremennikov [Konstantin Simonov in the memoirs of his contemporaries], Moskva : Sovetskiy pisatel', 1984, OCLC 12216235.
- Tatlin, New York : Rizzoli, 1988, ISBN 9780500234785.
- Tatline. Masterskaia Tatlina. Paris : P. Sers, 1990.

== Articles by Zhadova ==
- "Khudozhestvenno-konstruktorskaya firma R. Loewy v Parizhe [Art and design firm R. Loewy in Paris]", in: Tekhnicheskaya estetika, 1965, vol. 9.
- "Zametki ob ital'yanskom dizayne [Notes on Italian Design]", in: Tekhnicheskaya estetika, 1966, vol. 2, 4.
- "Sovetskiy otdel na Mezhdunarodnoy vystavke dekorativnogo iskusstva i promyshlennosti v Parizhe v 1925 godu [Soviet department at the International Exhibition of Decorative Arts and Industry in Paris in 1925]", in: Tekhnicheskaya estetika, 1966, vol. 10.
- "Zhizn' Mayakovskogo v illyustratsiyakh [Mayakovsky's life in illustrations]", in: Dekorativnoye iskusstvo SSSR, 1967, vol. 11.
- "Lyubov' Popova", in: Tekhnicheskaya estetika, 1967, vol. 11.
- "O teorii sovetskogo dizayna 20-kh gg. [On the theory of Soviet design in the 1920s]", in: Voprosy tekhnicheskoy estetiki, 1968, vol. 1.
- "O yaponskom dizayne i yego sozdatelyakh [About Japanese design and its creators]", in: Tekhnicheskaya estetika, 1968, vol. 4, 6.
- "Skul'pturnyy dizayn Italii [Sculptural design in Italy], in: Dekorativnoye iskusstvo SSSR, 1969, vol. 12.
- "Ettore Sottsass", in: Dekorativnoye iskusstvo SSSR, 1969, vol. 12.
- "VKHUTEMAS — VKHUTEIN. Stranitsy istorii [VKHUTEMAS - VKHUTEIN. Pages of history]", in: Dekorativnoye iskusstvo SSSR, 1970, vol. 11.
- "Krasnoderevshchiki ne slali mebel' na dom [The cabinetmakers didn't send the furniture to the house]", in: Dekorativnoye iskusstvo SSSR, 1971, vol. 12.
- "Teatr Mayakovskogo. Stranitsy istorii [Mayakovsky's theater. Pages of history]", in: Dekorativnoye iskusstvo SSSR, 1973, vol. 6.
- "Tsvetovaya sistema Matyushina [Matyushin's color system]", in: Iskusstvo, 1974, vol. 8, p. 38–42.
- "B.V. Ender o tsvete i tsvetovoy srede [B.V. Ender on color and color environment]", in: Tekhnicheskaya estetika, 1974, vol. 11.
- "Iz istorii sovetskoy polikhromii [From the history of Soviet polychromy]", in: Tekhnicheskaya estetika, 1975, vol. 7.
- "O farfore N. M. Suyetina [About porcelain N. M. Suetin]", in: Sovetskoye dekorativnoye iskusstvo, 1975, vol. 73/74.
- "B. Ender", in: Iskusstvo, 1978, vol. 6.
- "Poiski khudozhestvennogo sinteza na rubezhe stoletiy [The search for artistic synthesis at the turn of the century]", in: Dekorativnoye iskusstvo SSSR, 1976, vol. 8.
- "K vystavke Tatlina — odnogo iz osnovopolozhnikov sovetskoy shkoly dizayna [On the exhibition of Tatlin - one of the founders of the Soviet school of design]", in: Tekhnicheskaya estetika, 1977, vol. 7.
- "'Tribuna Lenina'. Stranitsy istorii sovetskogo dizayna ['Lenin's Tribune'. Pages of the history of Soviet design]", in: Tekhnicheskaya estetika, 1977, vol. 7.
- "Zarozhdeniye printsipov sovremennoy polikhromii [The origin of the principles of modern polychromy]", in: Tekhnicheskaya estetika, 1978, vol. 2.
- "Stil' Oktyabrya [October Style]", in: Iskusstvo, 1978, vol. 6.
- "Gosudarstvennyy institut khudozhestvennoy kul'tury (GINKHUK) v Leningrade [State Institute of Artistic Culture (GINHUK) in Leningrad]", in: Problemy istorii sovetskoy arkhitektury: Sbornik nauchnykh trudov, 1978, vol. 4, p. 25–28.
- "Malevich — tsvetopis', obyomostroyeniye [Malevich - color painting, volumetric construction]", in: Khudozhestvennyye problemy predmetno-prostranstvennoy sredy, Moskva 1978.
- "K.S. Malevich (k 100-letiyu so dnya rozhdeniya) [K. S. Malevich (to the 100th anniversary of his birth)]", in: Trudy VNIITE, 1979.
- "'Suprematičeskij order' [Supremacist order]", in: Problemy istorii sovetskoy arkhitektury, 1983, vol. 6.
- "Arkhitekturnyy fakul'tet VKHUTEMASa — VKHUTEINa [Faculty of Architecture VKHUTEMAS - VKHUTEIN]", in: VHUTEMASVHUTEIN, Moskva 1986.
