= Dmitry Gorchakov =

Russian dramatist and playwright (1758–1824)

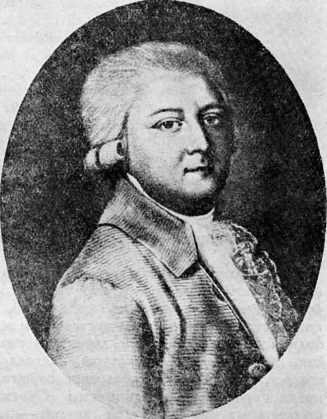
- Born: January 12, 1758; Kostroma, Russian Empire
- Died: December 11, 1824 (aged 66); Moscow, Russian Empire

Prince Dmitry Petrovich Gorchakov (Russian: князь Дми́трий Петро́вич Горчако́в, IPA: [ˈdmʲitrʲɪj pʲɪˈtrovʲɪtɕ ɡərtɕɐˈkof]; January 12 [January 1], 1758 – December 11 [November 19] 1824) was a Russian writer, dramatist and poet, best known for his satirical verses and three comical operas, staged at the end of the 18th century.

== Biography ==
Gorchakov was born in Kostroma Governorate, the only son of Prince Pyotr I. Gorchakov, member of an empoverished Russian aristocratic family, the Chernigov's line of Ryurikovichs. He received a high quality education at home, in 1768 joined the army, took part in Wallachian and Crimean campaigns but in 1782 (for reasons that remained unclear), retired to engage himself in agricultural activities in his Tula estate. It was in the early 1780s that he first started to write poetry.

In 1790 Gorchakov rejoined the Russian army as a volunteer, took part in the battle at Izmail, was seriously wounded and was praised for courage by Aleksandr Suvorov. In 1807 Gorchakov was made an honorary Russian Academy member. From 1807-1910 he served as a Governorate procurator in Pskov and Tavria, then as a high-ranked administrative official in the Moldovan army. In 1811 he became the member of an influential group known as Beseda (the Lovers of the Russian Word Meetings). In 1813 Gorchakov was appointed a vice-Governor of Kostroma, in 1816 he retired and moved to Moscow where he lived up until his death in 1824. Gorchakov was buried in the Danilov monastery in Moscow.

== Works ==
Gorchakov was best known for his comedy plays King for a Day (Калиф на час, Moscow, 1786), The Lucky Tonya (Счастливая тоня, Moscow, 1786) and Baba Yaga (Баба-Яга, Kaluga, 1788). Based on Arab and Russian folklore, but featuring 'modern' characters (with 'character' names like podyachy Bribetakin), these works parodied ways of Russian petty officials, denouncing corruption, bribery and theft. Among his major influences were Gavrila Derzhavin and Nikolai Nikolev, the latter a close friend. It was the latter's anti-tyranny tragedy Sorena and Zamir that inspired Gorchakov to write in the late 1880s his pro-democracy, American-based tragedy which remained both untitled and unpublished. Another unpublished "comedy in verse", The Carefree One (Беспечный) was staged in 1799 in Saint Petersburgh. His novelet Plamir and Raida came out in 1796.

A keen analyst of the European political affairs, Gorchakov in the early 1800s was regarded as the leading Russian satirist. Some of his poems were published in the Drug Prosveshchenya (Friend of Enlightenment) magazine in 1804-1806, more of the others circulated privately as hand-written manuscripts, best-known of which was The Epistle to Prince S.N.Dolgorukov which in many ways (notably by bringing to mind the famous Tchatsky's monologue) pre-empted Woe from Wit, Aleksander Griboyedov's 1823 classic. Young Aleksander Pushkin was much impressed by Gorchakov’s works. In his 1815 poem Gorodok (Small Town) he mentioned him and his satires ("I love your needle-sharp verse..."). Tellingly, in 1828 amidst The Gabrieliad scandal, Pushkin tried to ascribe his "dirty" poem to Gorchakov, then four years dead, trying to exploit the latter's reputation as the early 1800s Russia's major volnodumetz ("free-thinking man").

The first ever attempt to collect Gorchakov's legacy was made in 1890 by his granddaughter Princess Yelena Gorchakova who published The Works of D. P. Gorchakov (Russian: Сочинения Д.П. Горчакова). This volume was far from comprehensive, though: none of the earlier publications were included. Large part of Gorchakov's legacy has been lost: a bulk of his unpublished material along with numerous rough copies has perished in the fire that destroyed his country house, while some of poems he did publish remained anonymous.
