= Technical Aesthetics =

Soviet design journal, 1964–1992

Issue 4, 1987, featuring Dmitry Azrikan's Sphinx (СФИНКС)

Technical Aesthetics (Техническая эстетика in Russian) was a Soviet monthly journal published between January 1964 and July 1992 dedicated to questions of design with peak distribution of 30,000 copies. It was edited by the VNIITE, the All-Union Technical Aesthetics Research Institute. Some of the topics it covered were the history, theory and practice of design in Russia and abroad, ergonomics, art and design education, and reviews of design exhibitions and books. The magazine regularly exposed Western design trends and innovations, which were often compared with their Soviet counterparts. It also rehabilitated the memory of movements such as Russian constructivism, which had been condemned by Stalin in favour of Socialist realism, even though they set the foundations of Russian design in the early 1920s.

According to art historian Alexandra Chiriac, the term technical aesthetics was invented in Russia in the 1960s to speak about the field of design, which wasn't really developed in the country at the time, and which was promoted through the VNIITE research institute and the Technical Aesthetics magazine.

== History and Publication ==
Technical Aesthetics launched on January 1, 1964, with an initial circulation of 7,000 copies. It rapidly grew, reaching about 29,000 copies by the mid-1970s, and peaked near 38,000, but economic issues in the late Soviet period reduced circulation to approximately 11,700 copies by its final issue in 1992.

== Editorial Leadership ==
From its inception in 1964, the journal was led by founding editor-in-chief Yuri B. Soloviev. Soloviev, a trained architect, was also the first director of VNIITE. He was a central figure in Soviet industrial design who guided the magazine’s focus on design theory and practice both in the USSR and abroad. He also served as head of the Soviet Designers' Union. Under his leadership (1964–1990), the journal showcased research in ergonomics, design methodology, and the history of design.

Among the most influential contributors was Selim O. Khan‑Magomedov, a renowned historian of Soviet avant-garde architecture and design, who published seminal articles linking contemporary design with 1920s modernist ideas. Khan-Magomedov’s work in the magazine helped revive interest in constructivist design principles and highlighted the continuity between avant-garde theory and Soviet industrial design.

Another key voice was Larisa Zhadova, an art historian whose essays on Western designers such as Mario Bellini, Ettore Sottsass, and Tomás Maldonado played a crucial role in introducing international design discourse to Soviet readers. Her writings helped shape the worldview of a new generation of Soviet designers during the 1960s.

Vladimir Zinchenko, a prominent psychologist and one of the founding figures of Soviet engineering psychology, led the ergonomics department at VNIITE for over 15 years and also served as an editor of Technical Aesthetics. His work bridged psychology and industrial design, and he authored the first ergonomics textbook published in the USSR, laying the foundation for human-centered design practices in Soviet industry.

Notable deputy editors included Zhanna Fedoseyeva and Svetlana Silvestrova, who contributed to the journal's popularity. Thanks in part to their editorial efforts and the efforts of Solovyev as the main editor, the journal’s circulation reached its peak during the 1970s and 1980s, reflecting its growing influence within Soviet design and intellectual circles. In the final years of publication, Leonid Kuzmichev succeeded Soloviev as editor-in-chief, leading the journal from November 1990 until its closure.

== Themes and Content ==
The journal promoted the field of technical aesthetics (техническая эстетика), a uniquely Soviet discipline that merged industrial design with ergonomics, engineering psychology, graphic communication, and environmental design. Developed through the efforts of VNIITE, the field was framed not only as a technical or artistic pursuit, but as a socially responsible practice tied to labor efficiency, technological progress, and cultural identity. Technical Aesthetics became the leading platform for articulating and refining this vision.

It featured in-depth theoretical essays, design critiques, and product analyses, drawing from both Soviet industry and international case studies. The journal regularly published translated excerpts from Western sources and visual reports from international exhibitions in Milan, Tokyo, and Cologne, fostering a rare comparative dialogue during the Cold War era. Beyond its practical focus, the journal also played a vital intellectual role. It contributed to the ideological rehabilitation of early Soviet avant-garde movements, particularly Constructivism and Productivism, by showcasing figures such as Tatlin, Rodchenko, and El Lissitzky, and by publishing scholarly articles that reframed their work within contemporary design discourse. This re-evaluation helped integrate suppressed modernist legacies into the pedagogical and theoretical canon of late Soviet design education. As such, the journal shaped not only contemporary design production but also the historical narrative of Soviet aesthetics itself.

== Design and Visual Identity ==
Technical Aesthetics was notable for its innovative visual identity. Early issues featured minimalist covers with geometric or striped backgrounds, making them stand out among Soviet publications of the time. Major redesigns occurred in 1967 and 1973 under art director Vladimir Kazmin, who introduced cleaner, structured layouts inspired by international modernist trends, notably the functionalist Braun aesthetic. The journal also articulated a philosophical dimension to design, framing technical aesthetics as a way to interpret even scientific instruments through artistic precision, as demonstrated in recent scholarly analysis of Soviet-era optics and laboratory tools.

== International Influence ==
Despite its domestic focus, Technical Aesthetics had international reach, facilitated by Yuri Solovyev’s prominent role in the International Council of Societies of Industrial Design (ICSID), where he served as president from 1977 to 1980. Digitized archives of Technical Aesthetics remain valuable resources for researchers, design historians, and exhibitions exploring Soviet-era design culture.

Technical Aesthetics not only documented Soviet design ideology but also served as a mediator between global modernist discourse and socialist values, shaping how designers interpreted international aesthetics within a planned economy. Even after its closure, the journal has been recognized as a key historical record of Soviet design ambitions, particularly in how it reflected VNIITE’s efforts to assert a distinct yet globally conversant design identity.
