= Mikhail Savoyarov =

Russian actor and singer (1876–1941)

- Михаи́л Никола́евич Савоя́ров
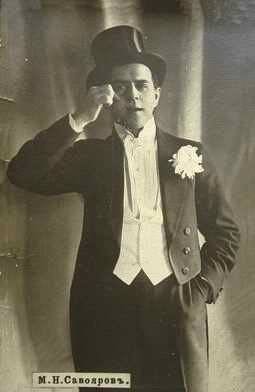
- Mikhail Savoyarov a postcard (1912)
- Born: 18 November [O.S. 30 November] 1876; Moscow
- Died: 4 August 1941 (aged 64); Moscow
- Occupations: Chansonnier, composer, poet, comic actor, mime, singer-songwriter

Mikhail Savoyarov (Russian: Михаи́л Никола́евич Савоя́ров, Mikhai'l Nikoláevič Savoyárov) (18 November [O.S. 30 November] 1876, Moscow – 4 August 1941, Moscow) was a Russian chansonnier, composer, poet, comic actor, mime and the only fumist on the stage of the Russian Empire. In the first quarter of the 20th century he was a famous satirical singer-songwriter. His popularity peak was in the years of war (1914–1917) when he began to be called the «King of eccentrics». It was also the time when he became friends with Aleksandr Blok. Considering that the period of his greatest popularity was almost at the exact time as the brief period of renaming the capital, Savoyarov can be called the Petrograd artist in the strict sense of the word.

== Biography ==
Mikhail Nikolayevich Savoyarov (Solovyov) was born on 30 November 1876 in Moscow. As a child he didn't receive music education. He learned to play violin without a teacher, also took private lessons. In the end of the 1890s Savoyarov moved to Saint Petersburg, started working as a violinist in a private opera house, and then in the Palace Theatre. The repertoire of these theatres included mostly operettas, which influenced his style. Savoyarov made his début on stage as an operetta tenor comedian by chance substituting for an ill actor. He had a success though not grand. Having an independent streak, soon he quit the theatre and started living on his own resources. Since 1905 he was seen playing in musical single-show companies (so called "capellas"), Russian, Ukrainian, Gipsy or pseudo-French ones which were in fashion and brought profit.

In 1905 Savoyarov began to compose and sing topical songs, set at first to operetta or folk songs music and later to his own melodies. Poetic and musical talent advanced him as a singer-songwriter. His repertoire included mostly songs and trolls accompanied by piano, violin, dancing, pantomime and eccentric acting often turned into brazen antics and buffoonery. It's significant that his style of acting coincides with his last name Savoyarov that comes from French word savoyard which means a strolling musician, a troubadour from Savoy.

In 1907 Savoyarov had a success on fair of Nizhny Novgorod where he performed together with his first wife Ariadna Azagarina. Earlier she was famous in single-show companies as a French cabaret singer. Performing as "French-russian duet" they had a repertoire that consisted of comic and satiric scenes including singing, dancing, disguise and impersonations using theatrical costumes, make-up, mise-en-scènes and even decorations.

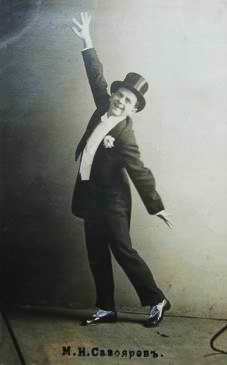
Mikhail Savoyarov a postcard (1914)

In 1914 Savoyarov published his first collection of texts of his own composition and joined the Society of Dramatists and Composers. At the age of 40 he wrote his best songs and reached the height of his fame. Savoyarov's favorite character is a flâneur of high society, dandy, petty bourgeois, low dives frequenter with a rumpled or well-pressed dress coat and a top hat or a bowler on, a cane in a hand and a chrysanthemum in his buttonhole. Sometimes Savoyarov also used a mask of a criminal, and for such cases he composed special topical songs. One of them represented the author: "I'm a thief, that's what I'm proud of, and my name is Savoyarov". Playing "himself" on the stage is typical of his work.

There were times when his limited popularity as a satirist and humourist was a burden to Savoyarov who was trying to break through genre barrier of high poetry with such works as the dramatic melodeclamation titled Glory to Russian woman (of military-patriotic character) or the dramatic scene The Aviator’s death which however didn’t have much success.

Savoyarov’s popularity reached its peak by 1916–1917. His comic topical songs such as "Kisanka, Walked, Thank you kindly, Our Culture, Because of the Ladies" were reissued and many times and were very popular to quote, and the eccentric scene "Moon oh moon, are you drunk indeed?" was sung by literally everyone in Petrograd. The countless couplets of Our culture had a particularly big success. Many actors included them into their repertoires with the author’s consent and also repeatedly "stole" them. The reproachful chorus of this song ("Here’s the fruits of education, here’s our culture!") was used by different authors to create renewed versions of the late 1920s.

During 1915–1917, many of Savoyarov’s topical songs were notable for satirical and political jokes. Therefore not all of them were published constantly being censored and abridged in the number of couplets.

During wartime, Savoyarov met Aleksandr Blok who attended his concerts in cinemas and café chantant a dozen times in 1914–1918. Sometimes Blok brought actors who recited his poems and plays onstage. Thus in 1918 he persistently showed Savoyarov’s performances to his wife L.D. Mendeleyeva-Blok so that she could "adopt" his eccentric manner (for reading "The Twelve" poem). Vsevolod Meyerhold also attended Savoyarov’s concerts while working on his play Balaganchik (‘The Puppet Show’). According to Blok, Savoyarov’s Balaganchik was "way better than ours". Here’s one of his notes on this subject that Blok wrote in his journals:

"...Liuba finally saw Savoyarov who plays on tour in miniature close to us. — Why measuring ounces of Alexandrians’ talent who always perform after lunch and before dinner if there’s a real art in ‘miniature’?..."

— Aleksandr Blok, sketchbooks (20 March 1918).

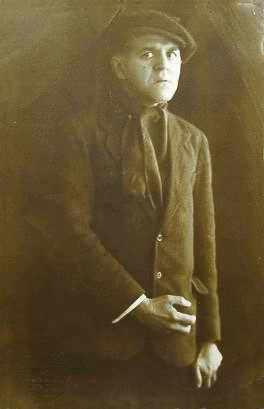
Mikhail Savoyarov playing the role of a criminal, a postcard (1915)

Blok didn't recite "The Twelve" himself because he couldn't do it well. Usually, his wife performed reading of the poem. However, according to the audience who listened The Twelve performed by Liubov Dmitriyevna her did it poorly, falling into bad theatricism. A big woman with massive arms bare almost to her shoulders was rushing about on the stage dramatically shouting and gesticulating, sitting down and jumping up again. It seemed to some of the audience that Blok didn’t like listening to Lyubov Dmitriyevna’s reading either. But it was unlikely to be truth because Blok was always advising her and showing how to recite the poem. That’s why he was taking Lyubov Dmitriyevna to Savoyarov’s concerts. Apparently Blok believed The Twelve poem should be recited in this specific rough and eccentric manner, the way Savoyarov did it playing the role of a criminal from St. Petersburg. However Blok himself didn’t know and didn’t learn how to recite. To do that he would have to become, as he put it, a ‘variety poet and singer of satirical songs’ himself.

Savoyarov didn’t leave it unanswered. Specially for the famous guest of his concerts he wrote a few mock verses imitating ‘with delicate irony’ Blok’s most popular lines or intonation (for example: "A night. A street. A lamp. A drugstore" turned into "A store. A crowd. A low price"). Being aware that Blok is in the audience Savoyarov always performed such satirical songs for him. The live dialogue between the two poets during the concert delighted the public.

Like Blok, Savoyarov tried to cooperate with the new regime during the first years after the October Revolution. He headed the Petrograd variety actors’ union for three years. Then however he was supplanted by ‘real’ proletarian actors. During the 1920s Savoyarov endeavoured to be relevant, referring to new Soviet themes, he kept on writing and performing. Among the songs performed by his second wife, artiste Yelena Nikitina (1899–1973) the most successful were the operetta Proletarian's song and a love song parody You're still the same where the decadent intonations of Vertinsky were derided.

Savoyarov continued to give concerts all over the USSR up until 1930. He was over 50 at that time. His repertoire of that time includes satirical songs "What a thing to happen!" (in Charleston beat), monologues in «Rayok» genre (rhymed humorous "talk shows", a special kind of rhymed prose) such as You say, we’re going to far; I want to love the whole world (1925), musical feuilleton "Records, big deal!" (1929), a parody song Little bricks and other. However Savoyarov couldn't repeat his Petrograd success of 1915.

By the early 1930s, Savoyarov stopped giving concerts. The political situation in the country stood stock-still, socialist associations of creative professions were formed and it became impossible to organize concerts independently. The Bolshevik Party didn't welcome any eccentric, satirical in particular.

In 1933 Savoyarov moved from Leningrad to Moscow where he lived the rest 7 years of his life. He died (or was killed?) a month and a half after the war on Germany started. On 4 August 1941 Mikhail Savoyarov died of heart rupture during the bombing in the 43 Lesnaya street gateway. He wouldn't hide in the bombshelter during the air raids.

== Artistic influence ==
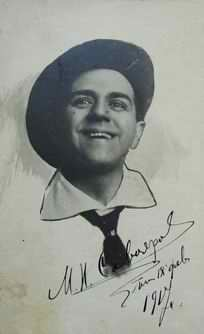
Mikhail Savoyarov a postcard (1913)

From the very beginning of his stage career, Savoyarov gained a reputation as an artist of a rough style. Over the years, he comprehensively developed and strengthened this opinion about himself. In the 1910s, Mikhail Savoyarov, having received the title of “king of eccentricity” and the nickname “vomiting chansonnier,” also declared himself the only heir to French fumism on Russian soil. As a teenager, having experienced the influence of some Parisian fumists and the Russian obscene poet Pyotr Schumacher, who was ″the first to sing the praises of shit″, in the 1890s, Savoyarov later, as a tribute of respect and gratitude, called his “unbridled” concerts “smoky fonforisms” or “fanfaronnades”.

Savoyarov was the first to the Russian music scene his own eccentric style of performing different from circus or theatre. In the 1910s both success and influence follow the ‘music concerts’ of Igor Severyanin as well as poetry accompanied by Mikhail Kuzmin. However, it was Aleksandr Blok who was influenced the most by eccentric style of an artist and even poet Savoyarov. It's the most evident in his post-revolutionary works. According to academic Shklovsky few comprehended «The Twelve» poem and condemned it because everyone was used to take Blok seriously only. The Twelve, a portrayal of criminal revolutionary Petrograd, which was compared by Shklovsky to the Bronze Horseman by Pushkin, had brand new images:

«...The Twelve is an ironical work. It’s written not even with folk rhyme but with "flash" language. A Savoyarov style of street trolls».

— (Viktor Shklovsky, the Hamburg account: articles, memoirs, essays (1914-1933).

Shklovsky talked about Savoyarov's songs in ‘ragged genre’ performing which he would go on stage dressed and painted as a criminal. George Balanchine, a choreographer, forever memorized Savoyarov singing thieves songs: "Alyosha, sha! – take a half-tone lower, stop telling lies"... Such criminal atmosphere in The Twelve poem pervades Petrograd, a frightful city of the snowy winter of 1918.

Savoyarov put musical in common practice parody songs of (or responses to) other authors. The most famous of them were Child, don’t hurry (a response to Mikhail Kuzmin’s romance Child and rose) and You’re still the same (a parody of Vertinsky’s romance Your little fingers smell incense). Often during his concerts in the 1920s Savoyarov would change costumes, make himself up and performed the second part under the name (and the mask) of ‘artist Valertinsky’. This did a good turn for Vertinsky who wasn't forgotten during the period of his immigration.

Savoyarov's easy manner of singing, gesticulating, constantly moving around the stage and playing the violin had a profound effect. After the manner of Savoyarov, in the 1920-30s playing violin his disciple, a singer of satirical songs Grigory Krasavin, the first performer of the famous Bublichki (‘Bagels’) of Yakov Yadov, started performing.

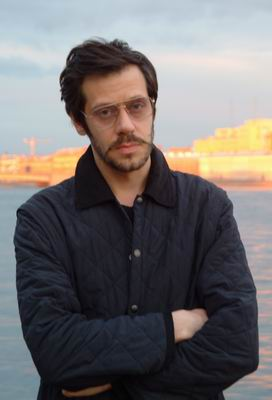
Yuri Khanon, Saint Petersburg, 2008.

In the 1930s, both in Leningrad and Moscow, many artists learned from Savoyarov. Among the most famous is Arkady Raikin. In the 1930s Raikin started not as a reciter and satirist but as a musical eccentric and a dancer mime and his first fame and the title of laureate of the all-USSR variety actors competition came to him thanks to his dance and mimic numbers Chaplin and Mishka.

That was also the time when Alexander Menaker learned a lot from Savoyarov. His school of eccentric can be distinguished in Andrei Mironov, Menaker's son's, manner of performing and in musical parts of young Konstantin Raikin. One of Savoyarov's songs of 1915 (rural scene Trumpeters) is performed by Andrei Mironov in Eldar Ryazanov’s film (O Bednom Gusare Zamolvite Slovo, 1981) Say a Word for the Poor Hussar ("...across the village are running the boys, the girls, the women, the kids, like a swarm of locusts, the trumpeters blow the trumpets" ). The music for this number was rewritten by the composer Andrei Petrov, but the lyrics by Savoyarov remained the same.

Earlier, back in the 1960s, Alexander Galich loved to perform this song, constantly improvising with a guitar and each time changing the author’s text, both musical and poetic. «Trumpeters» is also cited repeatedly in Yuri German′s novel, «My Dear Man». Along with Nikolai Zabolotsky′s poem, «The signs of the Zodiac are fading out», Savoyarov′s song becomes iconic. As if stamped with some kind of inner community, «Trumpeters» marks heroes who demonstratively fail to fit into the stifling atmosphere of Stalinist Russia.

One of art historian Andrei Rossomakhin's theoretical works explores the similarities between Savoyarov′s legacy and the work of another renowned pop singer and writer. This is Sergei Shnurov, who revives and develops the most brutal traditions of pre-revolutionary Russian pop music at the turn of the 20th and 21st centuries, particularly Mikhail Savoyarov, with his constant wordplay, parodies, and harsh style, far removed from any rules or norms of decency. Contemporary mockery, parody and grotesque, jargon and jokes, the artistic persona of the lumpen proletariat and alcoholic, cruelty and rudeness (bordering on the physiological), work outside the norm, and the creation of his own format — all of this, exactly one hundred years later, connects Sergei Shnurov with the «king of eccentricity» of the era of wars and revolutions.

This opinion is very closely related to the words of Psoy Korolenko, who in the late 2010s repeatedly noted the profound influence that the creative manner, as well as the poetic and artistic style of Mikhail Savoyarov, had on him.

«…Currently, some of my songs, some of the original verses I'm writing today, have been strongly influenced by his <Mikhail Savoyarov> aesthetics, his poetics, his energy. Even though <only> the notes exist, and there are no audio recordings of him, none left…, somehow Savoyarov also came into our attention and horizons, and struck our imagination with such depth, unexpectedness, paradox, freedom, experimentation, and a combination of <…> outward coarseness, grotesqueness, sometimes deliberately crude comedy, and extraordinary subtlety and chastity… and subtlety, such a subtle perception of the world that lies behind it all. And this genre, which combines the crude and the subtle, which... some of this is in the circus, some of this is in clowning, some of this is in certain genres of song, in certain theatrical roles, it is one of the sources of inspiration, <...> a kind of compass, perhaps, or some very intriguing and very intricate reference point...»

One of the most evident artistic influences of Mikhail Savoyarov can be considered his grandson – a composer, a 1988 "European Oscar" winner and also a writer and artist working under a pseudonym Yuri Khanon. Khanon shared a lot in common with his grandfather, partly philosophically and academically. Another king of eccentrics’ granddaughter, Tatyana Savoyarova is also known as an eccentric artist (partly surrealist and mocker).

Savoyarov's artistic style was distinguished by the charms of ‘very lively’ performance, by natural musicality, plasticity, subtle nuances, the strong ability to transform, the ability to reveal the text and subtext, supplementing the singing with dancing and mimic scenes. Such a performance has one drawback: it must be seen and listened to in person. The archives didn't save neither gramophone recordings nor film fragments. Savoyarov only heritage left is published music, photographs and collections of poems.

== Literature ==
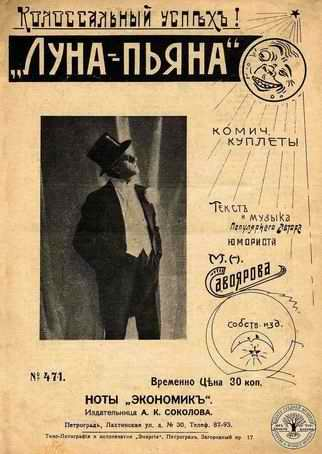
Savoyarov, «The Drunken Moon» (published music cover), Petrograd, 1915

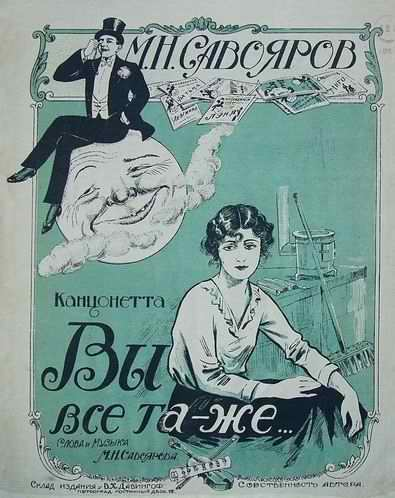
Savoyarov, «You’re still the same» (published music cover), Petrograd, 1921

- Aleksandr Blok, Collected works in eight volumes, Moscow, Khudozhestvennaya Literatura ("belles-lettres") state publisher, 1962.
- Aleksandr Blok, Collected works in six volumes, Leningrad, Khudozhestvennaya Literatura, 1962.
- Dmitry Gubin, Playing during the eclipse, Ogonyok periodical, No.26, iuni 1990.
- Encyclopedia of Russian Variety Art, ed. Uvarova, XX century, Moscow, Rospen, 2000.
- V. Orlov, The life of Blok, Moscow, Centrpoligraf, 2001.
- Mikhail Savoyarov, Songs & couplets of singer-songwriter. Petrograd, Evterpa, ed.1,2, 1914-1915.
- Mikhail Savoyarov, Songs: couplets, parodies, duets. Petrograd, Evterpa, ed.3, 1915.
- Mikhail Savoyarov, Because of the Ladies (published music), Economic, Petrograd, 1914.
- Mikhail Savoyarov, The Drunken Moon (published music), Evterpa, Petrograd, 1915.
- Mikhail Savoyarov, Trumpeters (published music), Evterpa, Petrograd, 1916.
- Mikhail Saltykov-Shchedrin, Mikhail Savoyarov. The History of a Town complete (based on original documents published by Yuri Khanon). — Saint Petersburg, Moscow: Center of Middle Music, 2026. — 336 p.
- Viktor Shklovsky, The Writing Table // V.B. Shklovsky, The Hamburg Account: articles, memoirs, essays (1914–1933), Moscow, Sovetsky Pisatel ("Soviet Writer") publisher, 1990.
- N. Sinev, In Life and in Variety, Kiev, 1983.
- G.Terikov, Topical songs in Variet, Moscow, 1987.
- Solomon Volkov, History of Saint Petersburg culture, Moscow, EKSMO, 2008.
- Solomon Volkov, tr. Bouis, Antonina W., St. Petersburg: A Cultural History (New York: The Free Press, 1995). ISBN 0-02-874052-1. en
- Variety in Russia, XX century: encyclopedia, ed. Uvarova, Moscow, OLMA-press, 2004.
- Yuri Khanon, Mikhail Savoyarov. «Through the Trumpeters» (or the experience of continuous persecution). St. Petersburg: Center of Middle Music, 2019.
- Yuri Khanon, Mikhail Savoyarov. «Favorites from abusive (Russian: “Избранное из Бранного” — “Selected curse words”). — St. Petersburg: Center of Middle Music, 2017. — 368 p. (in Russian)

== Liens ==
- Official website: Mikhail Savoyarov, «the King of slapstick» ru
- Mikhail Savoyarov: Encyclopedia of Variety and Circus ru
