= Sphinx (home automation system) =

Experimental Soviet project

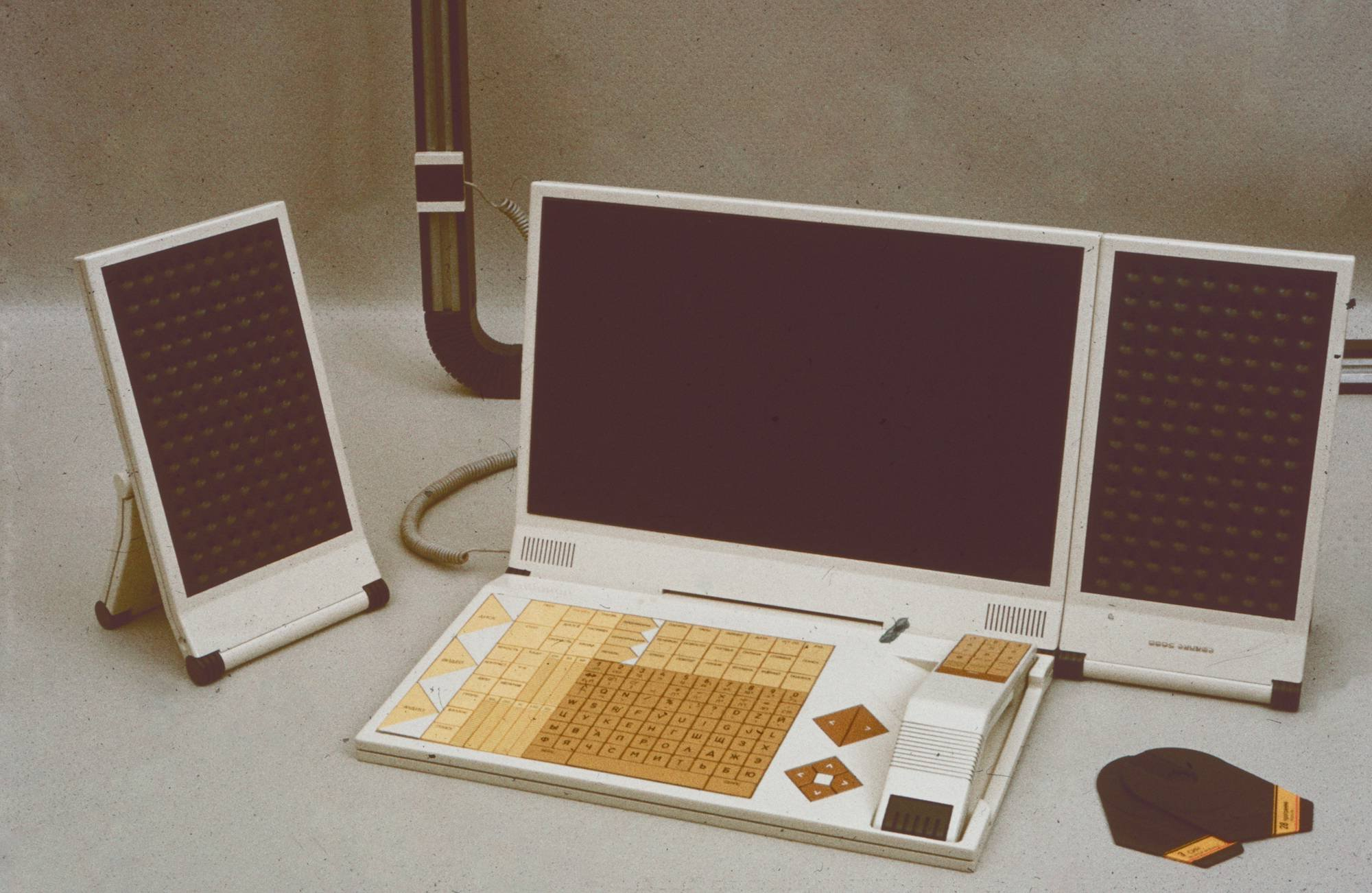
The Sphinx "Laptop" with integrated Keyboard and external Speakers.

The Sphinx (Russian: СФИНКС, romanized: SFINKS) was an experimental Soviet project for a home automation system, commissioned by the State Committee for Science and Technology and designed by Dmitry Azrikan, in collaboration with A. Kolotushkin and V. Goessen, in 1987. Sphinx, an acronym for Super Functional Integrated Communication System (Russian: Суперфункциональная интегрированная коммуникативная система), was intended to be an ensemble of modules that would allow consumers to easily interact with information systems.

The home environment, as described in a 1987 issue of Soviet magazine Technical Aesthetics (Russian: Техническая эстетика), would be composed of "spherical speakers, a detachable monitor, headphones, a handheld remote control with a removable display, a diskette drive, a processor with three memory blocks and more". The modules were designed to be used collectively, or individually by family members, and the number of memory blocks was supposed to be possibly increased endlessly according to the needs of the household so different family members could activate different programs simultaneously.

According to Sergey Moiseyev, Head the VNIITE (Russian design research institute):

The SPHINX equipment was designed to have everything integrated into one single system, and it was not just about creating a smart house: it also had a lot to do with solving some of the more important problems facing Soviet men and women. Say, for instance, that someone wanted to increase the functionality of his or her tape recorder. Back in the day, they would most certainly have come face to face with a number of difficulties with compatibility. Ergonomics too had its share of issues, since quite often even the appearance of the TV and the recorder had little, if anything, in common.

— Sergey Moiseyev,

The configuration of the Sphinx station, with detachable monitors and speakers, prefigured the environment of computer stations with peripheral touch pads and accessories that characterises informatics systems in the beginnings of the 21st century.
