= The Twelve (poem) =

1918 poem written by Alexander Blok

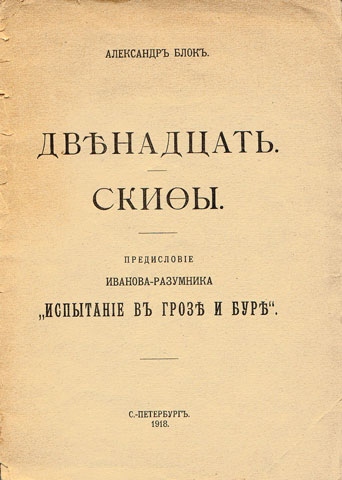
- Author: Aleksandr Blok
- Original title: Двѣнадцать
- Language: Russian
- Genre: Poem
- Publication date: 1918
- Publication place: Russia
- Media type: Print

The Twelve (Russian: Двена́дцать, romanized: Dvenádtsat) is a controversial long poem by Aleksandr Blok. Written early in 1918, the poem was one of the first poetic responses to the October Revolution of 1917.

== Background ==
The poem describes the march of twelve Red Guards (likened to the Twelve Apostles) through the streets of revolutionary Petrograd, with a fierce winter blizzard raging around them. The mood of the Twelve as conveyed by the poem oscillates from base and even sadistic aggression towards everything perceived bourgeois and counter-revolutionary, to strict discipline and sense of "revolutionary duty." A prostitute who is found with Ivan, who is from the same background as the Twelve but is in no revolutionary mood, is killed by one of the Twelve (Peter), who appears unusually struck by the accident and later reveals to his comrades that he had been in love with the woman. However, after the others remind him that in these revolutionary times one's personal tragedies are nothing, the murderer regains his determination and continues the march. In the last stanza of the poem, most controversially, a figure of Jesus Christ is seen in the snowstorm, heading the march of the Twelve.

The Twelve, with its "mood-creating sounds, polyphonic rhythms, and harsh, slangy language" (as the Encyclopædia Britannica termed it), promptly alienated Blok from a mass of his admirers. Accusations ranged from appallingly bad taste to servility before the new Bolshevik authorities and betraying his former ideals. On the other hand, most Bolsheviks scorned Blok's mysticism and asceticism and especially the mention of Christ.

Immediately following the publication (3 March 1918) in the socialist revolutionary newspaper "Banner of Labor", the poem was attacked by almost the whole of the Russian intelligentsia. Many of the former admirers, colleagues and even friends of Blok broke off their relationship with him. According to academic Shklovsky, few comprehended The Twelve and condemned it because everyone was used to only taking Blok seriously. The Twelve, a portrayal of criminal revolutionary Petrograd, which was compared by Shklovsky to The Bronze Horseman by Pushkin, had brand new images. He noted "The Twelve is an ironical work. It’s written not even with folk rhyme but with "flash" language. A Savoyarov style of street trolls".

Shklovky talked about Savoyarov's songs in the "ragged" genre, where he would go on stage dressed and made up as a criminal. George Balanchine, a choreographer, recalled Savoyarov singing thieves' songs: "Alyosha, sha! – take a half-tone lower, stop telling lies". Such a "criminal" atmosphere pervades the Petrograd of "The Twelve", a frightening city in the snowy winter of 1918. Aleksandr Blok considered this poem to be his best work.

During the war, Savoyarov met Aleksandr Blok who attended his concerts in cinemas and café chantant a dozen times in 1914–1918. Sometimes Blok brought actors who recited his poems and plays onstage. Thus in 1918 he persistently showed Savoyarov's performances to his wife Liubov Mendeleyeva-Blok so that she could "adopt" his eccentric manner (for reading The Twelve poem). He wrote in his journals: "Liuba finally saw Savoyarov who plays on tour in miniature close to us. Why measuring ounces of Alexandrians' talent who always perform after lunch and before dinner if there’s a real art in 'miniature'?"

Blok did not recite "The Twelve" himself because he could not do it well. Usually his wife performed the reading of the poem. However, according to the audience who listened to The Twelve performed by Liubov Blok, she did it poorly, falling into "bad theatricism". 'A big woman with massive arms bare almost to her shoulders rushed about on the stage dramatically shouting and gesticulating, sitting down and jumping up again.' It seemed to some of the audience that Blok did not enjoy listening to Lyubov Dmitriyevna's reading either. But this would have been unlikely because Blok was always advising her and showing how to recite the poem, such as by taking her to Savoyarov's concerts. Apparently Blok believed The Twelve poem should be recited in this specifically rough and eccentric manner, the way Savoyarov did it playing the role of a criminal from St. Petersburg. However Blok himself did not know how to recite, and did not wish to learn. To do that he would have to become, as he put it, a "variety poet and singer of satirical songs" himself.
