= Kozma Prutkov =

Fictional Russian author

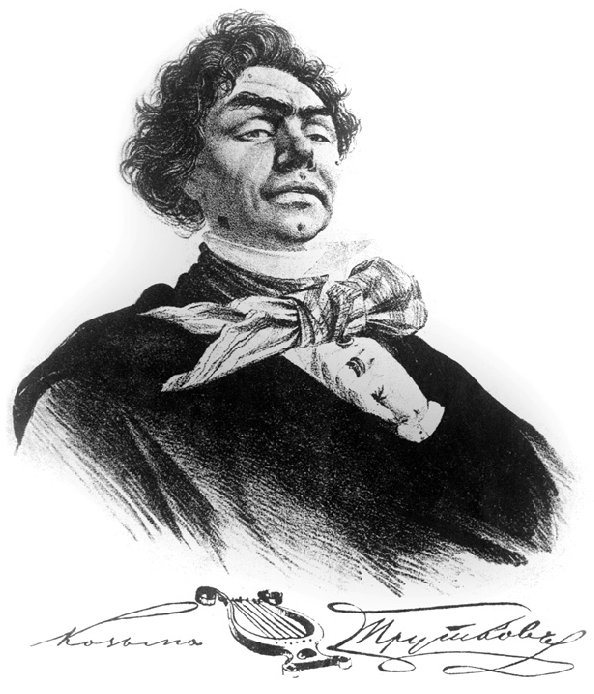
Kozma Prutkov satirised imperial bureaucrats

Kozma Petrovich Prutkov (Russian: Козьма́ Петро́вич Прутко́в) is a fictional author invented by Aleksey Konstantinovich Tolstoy (1817-1875) and his cousins, the brothers Alexei Zhemchuzhnikov (1821–1908), Vladimir Zhemchuzhnikov (1830–1884) and Alexander Zhemchuzhnikov (1826–1896), during the later part of the rule (1825–1855) of Emperor Nicholas I of Russia.

The four distinguished satirical poets used this pseudonym as a collective pen-name to publish parody aphorisms, fables, and epigrams, as well as satiric, humorous and nonsense verses in the 1850s and 1860s, most notably in the literary magazine Sovremennik (The Contemporary).

According to the (fictional) Biographical data on Kozma Prutkov, Prutkov, allegedly born on April 11, 1803, died on January 13, 1863. He worked for the government of the Russian Empire his entire adult life, and in 1820 entered military service as a hussar only for the uniform. He worked at the Assay Office (Пробирная Палата) from 1823 until his death, ending up as its director.

== Quotations ==
These are some of the best-known and most cited quotations from Prutkov:

- "Throwing pebbles into the water, look at the ripples they form on the surface. Otherwise this activity will be an empty amusement."
- "If you have a fountain, shut it down. Let even a fountain have a rest."
- "If you see a "buffalo" sign on an elephant's cage, do not trust your eyes."
- "If ever asked: What's more useful, the sun or the moon, respond: The moon. For the sun only shines during daytime, when it's bright anyway, whereas the moon shines at night."
  - This aphorism is usually associated with Mullah Nasruddin.
- "If you want to be happy, be so."
  - Frequently misattributed to Count Leo Tolstoy.
- "If you want to be handsome, enroll in the Hussars."
- "How pathetic is any constitution at sight of well-kept ammunition!"
- "Even an oyster has enemies"
  - Often quoted as "Even oysters have enemies"
  - E.g. Barbara Heldt Monter: Kozma Prutkov - the Art of Parody. Mouton 1973, p. 58 or Jack Nicholson at the 2010 AFI Life Achievement Award ceremony for Mike Nichols (without naming the author Kozma Prutkov)
  - (Original Russian: И устрица имеет врагов! - No. 86 in: Плоды раздумья - Мысли и афоризмы), ru.wikisource.)
- "One cannot hatch the same egg twice."
- "Many things are incomprehensible to us, not because our concepts are weak, but because these things are not in the circle of our concepts."
