= Aleksey Zhemchuzhnikov =

Russian poet, dramatist, essayist and literary critic

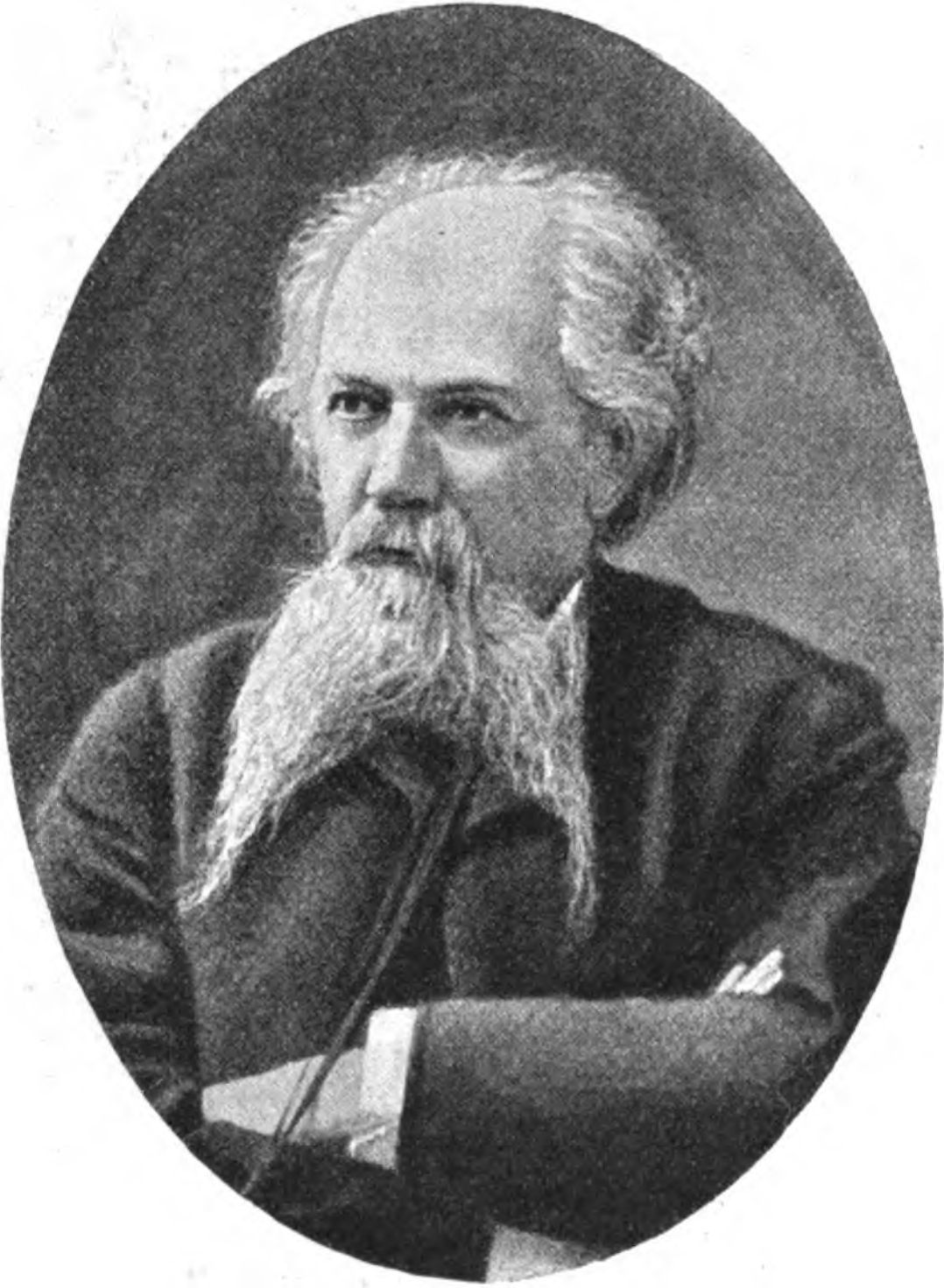
- Born: 23 February 1821; Pochep, Russian Empire
- Died: 7 April 1908 (aged 87); Tambov, Russian Empire
- Writing career
- Genres: Poetry, drama, criticism

Aleksey Mikhailovich Zhemchuzhnikov (Russian: Алексе́й Миха́йлович Жемчу́жников, 23 February 1821 – 7 April 1908) was a Russian poet, dramatist, essayist and literary critic, co-creator of Kozma Prutkov, the famous comical literary character.

== Biography ==
Aleksey Zhemchuzhnikov was born in Pochep, Chernigov Governorate (present-day Bryansk Oblast), a son of senator Mikhail Zhemchuzhnikov (1788—1865) and Olga Perovskaya (1799—1833), a sister of Aleksey Konstantinovich Tolstoy’s mother. Another well-known writer, Antony Pogorelsky, was his nephew.

Up until the age of fourteen Aleksey stayed at home, receiving private education. In 1835, after a short stint at the Saint Petersburg's First Gymnasium he joined the College of Law, that of which Prince Oldenburg was a trustee. It was "the set of high ideals and honourable aspirations" he's got in this college, that formed the basis of his outlook and life philosophy.

After the graduation in 1841 Zhemchuzhnikov joined the Russian Senate as an official; in 1847 he moved to the Ministry of Justice and in 1849 to the State Chancellery, all the while suffering greatly from "stupid mechanical routine" of these offices, seeking solace partly in high society's frivolous pleasures but more and more in literary exercises and numerous intellectual circles, including that of Mikhail Petrashevsky.

In the late 1840s Aleksey Zhemchuzhnikov alongside brothers Vladimir and Alexander, as well as Aleksey K. Tolstoy, created the Kozma Prutkov character which soon became famous. The Fantasy, a comedy he co-wrote with Tolstoy, was premiered on 8 January 1851 and was a spectacular flop. Nikolay I demonstratively left the theatre, outraged "with the absurdity of what's been going on stage," and the play was promptly banned. Not long before this, in 1850, Aleksey Zhemchuzhnikov made a debut in Sovremennik's February issue with his own comedy The Strange Night (Странная ночь). In 1852 another comedy of his, The Madman (Cумасшедший) appeared in Sovremennik (No. 11). In the 1850s his poems were published by Svistok (The Whistle), Otechestvennye Zapiski, Biblioteka Dlya Chteniya and Iskra magazines. On 1 January 1858, Zhemchuzhnikov quit the state service and started to enjoy "total private freedom," striking friendships with Sergey Aksakov, Ivan Turgenev, Vladimir Odoyevsky and Fyodor Tyutchev, among others.

Creative crisis made Zhemchuzhnikov (who felt he was beginning to evolve into a sub-Nekrasov type of a poet) stop writing, leave the capital and move first to Kaluga, then Moscow. From the mid-1860s he lived mostly in Europe - Germany, Switzerland, Italy and Southern France. In the late 1860s he returned to literature and started to contribute again to Otechestvennye Zapisky. Another long gap in Aleksey Zhemchuzhnikov's career was caused by his wife Yelizaveta's illness. She died in 1875. In 1880s he again started publishing poems, mainly in Vestnik Evropy, a magazine whose editorship and authors he had friendly relations with. In 1892 in Saint Petersburg Aleksey Zhemchuzhnikov's first volume of Select Poems came out in two volumes which received exceedingly warm reviews.

From 1884 Zhemchuzhnikov lived mostly in Pavlovka village in the Oryol Governorate, from 1890 - in Tambov and Ilyinovka village. Another collection, critically acclaimed Songs of the Old Age (Песни старости, 1900), made Zhemchuzhnikov one of Russia's most respected authors of the early 1900s. In 1899 he became the Honorary member of the Lovers of Russian Literature society and in 1900 an Honorary member of the Saint Petersburg Academy. Aleksey Mikhailovich Zhemchuzhnikov died in Tambov in 1908.

== Private life ==
In 1858 Alexey Zhemchuzhnikov married Yelizaveta Dyakova (1833—1875), a daughter of colonel Alexey Dyakov (1790—1837) and Baroness Maria D'Alheim (d. 1833). They had four children: Olga (1859-1920), Lydia (1860-1887), Anastasia and Vladimir.
