= Veronika Tushnóva =

- Born: March 27, 1915; Kazan, Russian Empire
- Died: July 7, 1965 (aged 50); Moscow, Soviet Union

Veronika Mikhailovna Tushnóva (Russian: Верони́ка Миха́йловна Тушно́ва; March 27, 1915 – July 7, 1965) was a Soviet poet and member of the Soviet Union of Writers. After completing her medical school studies, she found little satisfaction in being a doctor and turned her attention to writing.

== Biography ==
Tushnóva graduated from high school where she had pursued advanced studies of foreign languages. After graduating, at the insistence of her father, who wanted her to be a doctor, she entered the Leningrad Medical Institute where she studied for four years prior to 1935.

In 1936, after the death of her father and mother, she moved back to Leningrad, where she received her medical degree, but she found little satisfaction in being a doctor. At this time she married a psychiatrist named George Rozinsky. She moved to Moscow and was admitted to Gorky Literary Institute in 1941, but never finished it because of the beginning of the war. She served in World War II as a medical assistant in military hospitals.

Her first works were printed in 1944. She published several collections of poems: First Book (1945), Pathway (1954). Her keen lyrical talent was revealed in the collections Memory of the Heart (1958), One Hundred Hours of Happiness (1965) and others, in which she writes about higher love and calls for truly human relations among people. One of her most popular poems was They don't renounce loving. It was performed as a song by Alla Pugacheva.

She also worked as a literary translator. She died from cancer in Moscow on July 7, 1965.

== Family ==
She was married twice, but both marriages ended in divorce. She had a daughter from her first marriage named Natalia (Natalia Rozinskaya).

In her last years Tushnóva was involved in an affair with the poet Alexander Yashin, but he couldn't leave his family (Yashin had four children). Yashin died exactly three years after Tushnóva, also from cancer.

== Poetry collections ==
- Первая книга- First Book (1945)
- Пути-дороги- Pathway (1954)
- Дорога на Клухор- Road to Klukhor (1956)
- Память сердца- Heart's memory (1958)
- Второе дыхание- Second Wind (1961)
- Лирика- Lyrics (1963, 1969)
- Сто часов счастья- One Hundred Hours of Happiness (1965)
- Стихи- Poems (1969)
