= Feodosy Savinov =

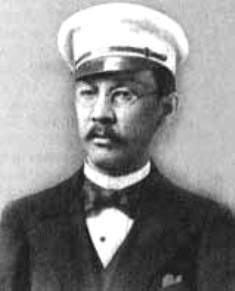
- Born: Феодосий Петрович Савинов; 1865; Totma, Vologda Governorate, Russian Empire
- Died: 1915 (aged 49–50); Kuvshinovo, Vologda Governorate, Russian Empire
- Occupation: poet
- Years active: 1885-early 1900s

Feodosy Petrovich Savinov (Russian: Феодо́сий Петро́вич Са́винов; born 1865, in Totma, Vologda region, Russian Empire – 1915, in village Kuvshinovo, Vologda region, Russian Empire) was Russian poet, best known for his poem "Rodnoye" (Close to Heart, 1885), part of which has been later turned into the lyrics of "Rodina", a popular tune, usually (and mistakenly) referred to as 'Russian folk song'.

Feodosy Savinov was born in Vologda to a local police official. After having dropped from Moscow University, he worked for several years as a clerk in his native city, then moved to Moscow where, working as a proofreader and freelance reporter, he started to write poetry, contributing to Zhivopisnoe obozrenie, Russkoye Obozrenye, Russkaya Mysl, Volna and Russky Vestnik. Savinov's Poems collection, originally published in Vologda in 1887 and re-issued in Moscow in 1900 in its extended version, failed to cause a stir. Still, two of its poems were set to music by the composer Pyotr Petrov-Boyarinov. Another one, "Rodnoye" (Родное, Close to Heart; first published by Volna in 1885), in the late 1900s was turned into a popular song "Vizhu chyudnoye privolye" (Вижу чудное приволье, I See Wonderful Freeland, also known as "Rodina", Motherland), by A.S. Samoylov (Abram S. Polyachek, 1889 - 1976), then a Saint Petersburg Conservatory student and piano accompanist for the singer A. Sokolskaya.

Savinov, who suffered from both alcoholism and paralytic dementia, was hospitalized in the early 1900s and died in asylum. "Vizhu chyudnoye privolye" was first recorded by Nina G. Tarasova for Zonophone Records in 1915, as "Lyubov k Rodine". It has been performed since then by numerous Russian and Soviet artists, including Sergey Lemeshev, as Russian folk song, its authors usually uncredited.

== Video ==
- Rodina (Vizhu chudnoye privolye), performed by Alexander Dedoff and the Kuban Cossack Choir (YouTube)
