= Alexander Blok =

Russian poet (1880–1921)

- Александр Блок
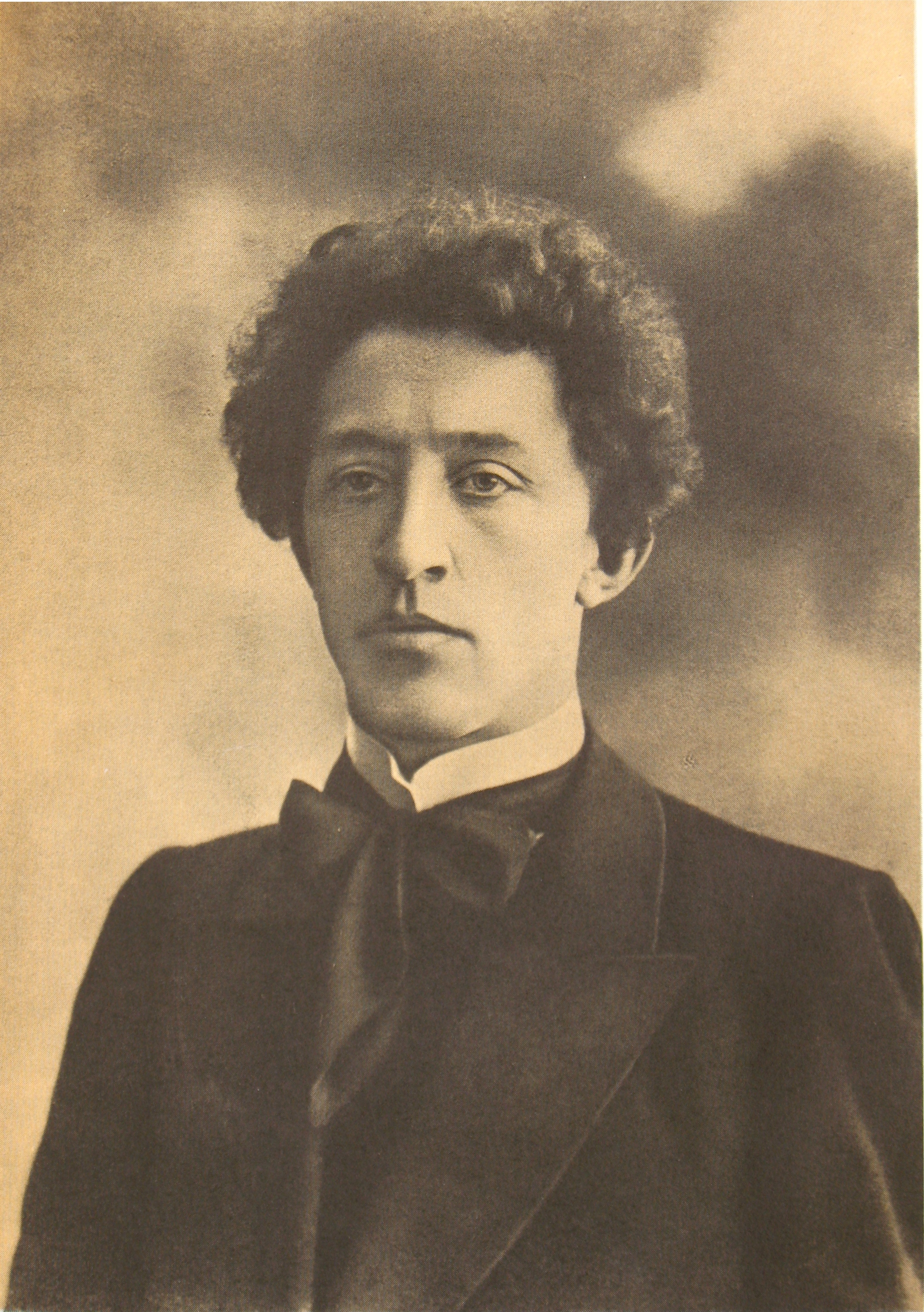
- Blok in 1903
- Born: 28 November [O.S. 16 November] 1880; Saint Petersburg, Russia
- Died: 7 August 1921 (aged 40); Petrograd, Russia
- Resting place: Literatorskiye Mostki, Saint Petersburg
- Occupations: Poet; writer; political commentator; playwright; translator; literary critic
- Writing career
- Language: Russian
- Notable work: The Twelve
- Movement: Russian symbolism

Alexander Alexandrovich Blok (Russian: Александр Александрович Блок, IPA: [ɐlʲɪˈksandr ɐlʲɪˈksandrəvʲɪtɕ ˈblok]; 28 November [O.S. 16 November] 1880 – 7 August 1921) was the best-known lyrical poet during the Silver Age of Russian Poetry.

== Early life ==
Blok was born in Saint Petersburg, into an intellectual family of Alexander Lvovich Blok and Alexandra Andreevna Beketova. His father was a law professor in Warsaw, and his maternal grandfather, Andrey Beketov, was a famous botanist and the rector of Saint Petersburg State University. After his parents' separation, Blok lived with aristocratic relatives at the manor Shakhmatovo near Moscow, where he discovered the philosophy of Vladimir Solovyov, and the verse of then-obscure 19th-century poets, Fyodor Tyutchev and Afanasy Fet. These influences would affect his early publications, later collected in the book Ante Lucem.

== Career and marriage ==
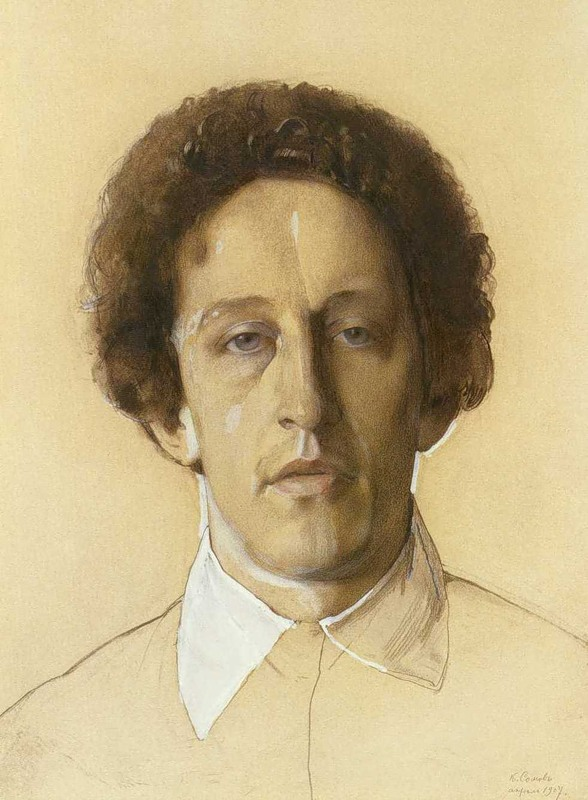
Portrait by Konstantin Somov, 1907

In 1903 he married the actress Lyubov (Lyuba) Dmitrievna Mendeleeva, daughter of the renowned chemist Dmitri Mendeleev. Later, she would involve him in a complicated love-hate relationship with his fellow Symbolist Andrei Bely. To Lyuba he dedicated a cycle of poetry that made him famous, Stikhi o Prekrasnoi Dame (Verses About the Beautiful Lady, 1904).

Blok enthusiastically greeted the 1905 Russian Revolution. During the last period of his life, Blok emphasised political themes, pondering the messianic destiny of his country (Vozmezdie, 1910–21; Rodina, 1907–16; Skify, 1918). In 1906 he wrote an encomium to Mikhail Bakunin. Influenced by Solovyov's doctrines, he had vague apocalyptic apprehensions and often vacillated between hope and despair. "I feel that a great event was coming, but what it was exactly was not revealed to me", he wrote in his diary during the summer of 1917. Quite unexpectedly for most of his admirers, he accepted the October Revolution as the final resolution of these apocalyptic yearnings.

In May 1917 Blok was appointed as a stenographer for the Extraordinary Commission to investigate illegal actions ex officio Ministers or to transcribe the (Thirteenth Section's) interrogations of those who knew Grigori Rasputin. According to Orlando Figes he was only present at the interrogation.

In November 1917, a few days after the October Revolution, the People's Commissar of Education, Anatoly Lunacharsky invited 120 of the leading writers and other cultural figures to a meeting, which almost all boycotted. Blok was one of five to attend, along with Vladimir Mayakovsky, Vsevolod Meyerhold and two others. When the Socialist Academy of Social Sciences was established in 1918, Blok became a participant.

His poem, The Twelve, written in 1918, describes 12 Red Guards in the violent chaos of the Russian Civil War, who are likened to the Apostles, while "Ahead of them, Jesus Christ goes."

Because this early show of support, Blok continued to be honoured by the Bolsheviks, despite his pre-revolutionary religious imagery, and his later disillusionment. In 1923, Leon Trotsky devoted a whole chapter of his book Literature and Revolution to Blok, saying that "Blok belonged to pre-October literature, but he overcame this, and entered into the sphere of October when he wrote The Twelve. That is why he will occupy a special place in the history of Russian literature." Given the official report on poetry to the First Congress of Soviet Writers , Nikolai Bukharin praised Blok as "a poet of tremendous power (whose) verse achieves a chiselled monumentality..." but added that "he thought that with the sign of the Cross he could bless and at the same time exorcise the image of the unfolding revolution, and he perished without having spoke his final word."

== Work ==
The idealized mystical images presented in his first book helped establish Blok as a major poet of the Russian Symbolism style. Blok's early verse is musical, but he later sought to introduce daring rhythmic patterns and uneven beats into his poetry. Poetical inspiration was natural for him, often producing unforgettable, otherworldly images out of the most banal surroundings and trivial events (Fabrika, 1903). Consequently, his mature poems are often based on the conflict between the Platonic theory of ideal beauty and the disappointing reality of foul industrialism (The Puppet Show, 1906).

Night, street and streetlight, drug store,
The purposeless, half-dim, drab light.
For all the use live on a quarter century –
Nothing will change. There's no way out.

You'll die – and start all over, live twice,
Everything repeats itself, just as it was:
Night, the canal's rippled icy surface,
The drug store, the street, and streetlight.

— "Night, street and streetlight, drugstore..." (1912) Trans. by Alex Cigale

The description of St Petersburg he crafted for his next collection of poems, The City (1904–08), was both impressionistic and eerie. Subsequent collections, Faina and the Mask of Snow, helped augment Blok's reputation. He was often compared with Alexander Pushkin, and is considered perhaps the most important poet of the Silver Age of Russian Poetry. During the 1910s, Blok was admired greatly by literary colleagues, and his influence on younger poets was virtually unsurpassed. Anna Akhmatova, Marina Tsvetaeva, Boris Pasternak, and Vladimir Nabokov wrote important verse tributes to Blok.

Blok expressed his opinions about the revolution by the enigmatic poem "The Twelve” (1918). The long poem exhibits "mood-creating sounds, polyphonic rhythms, and harsh, slangy language" (as the Encyclopædia Britannica termed it). It describes the march of twelve Bolshevik soldiers (likened to the Twelve Apostles of Christ) through the streets of revolutionary Petrograd, with a fierce winter blizzard raging around them. "The Twelve" alienated Blok from many of his intellectual readers (who accused him of lack of artistry), while the Bolsheviks scorned his former mysticism and asceticism.

Searching for modern language and new images, Blok used unusual sources for the poetry of Symbolism: urban folklore, ballads (songs of a sentimental nature) and ditties ("chastushka"). He was inspired by the popular chansonnier Mikhail Savoyarov, whose concerts during the years 1915–1920 were visited often by Blok. Academician Viktor Shklovsky noted that the poem is written in criminal language and in ironic style, similar to Savoyarov's couplets, by which Blok imitated the slang of 1918 Petrograd.

== Decline in health ==
By 1921 Blok had become disillusioned with the Russian Revolution. He had not written any poetry for three years. He complained to Maksim Gorky that his "faith in the wisdom of humanity" had ended, and explained to his friend Korney Chukovsky why he could not write poetry any more: "All sounds have stopped. Can't you hear that there are no longer any sounds?" Within a few days Blok became sick with asthma; he had earlier developed scurvy as well. His doctors requested that he be sent abroad for medical treatment, but he was not allowed to leave the country.

Gorky pleaded for a visa on Blok's behalf. On 29 May 1921, he wrote to Anatoly Lunacharsky: "Blok is Russia's finest poet. If you forbid him to go abroad, and he dies, you and your comrades will be guilty of his death." A resolution on departure for Blok was signed by members of the Political Bureau of the Central Committee on 23 July 1921. But on 29 July Gorky asked permission for Blok's wife to accompany him, since Blok's health had deteriorated sharply. Permission for Liubov' Dmitrievna Blok to leave Russia was signed by Molotov on 1 August 1921, but Gorky did not receive notification until 6 August. The permission was delivered on 10 August, but Blok had already died on 7 August.

Several months earlier, Blok had delivered a celebrated lecture on Alexander Pushkin, the memory of whom he believed to be capable of uniting White and Soviet Russian factions.

== Musical settings ==
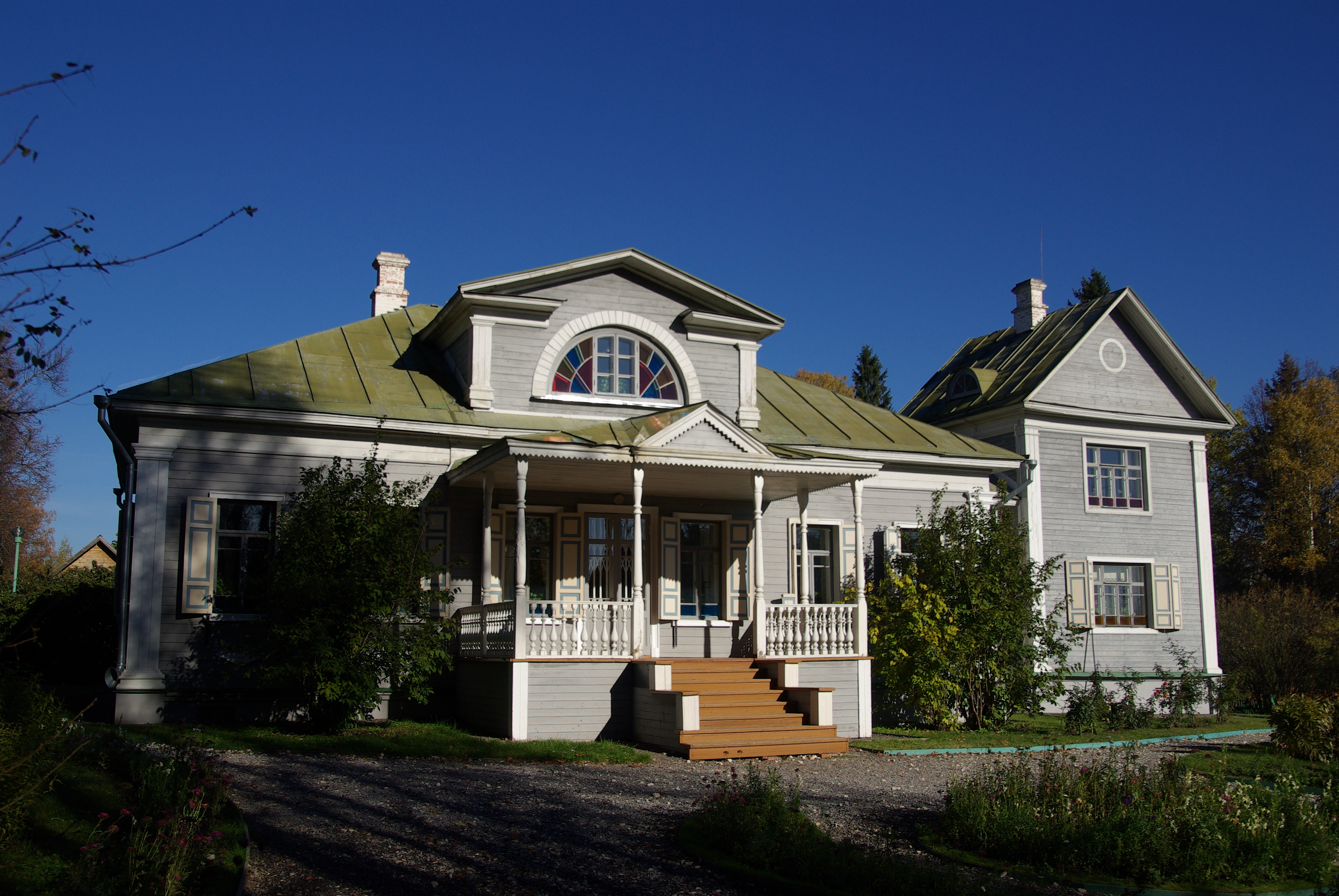
Shakhmatovo, Blok's country house

- Dmitri Shostakovich wrote a late song cycle for soprano and piano trio, Seven Romances on Poems by Alexander Blok, Op. 127.
- Mieczysław Weinberg wrote a song cycle for soprano and piano, Beyond the Border of Past Days, Op. 50.
- Arthur Lourié wrote a choral cantata, In the Sanctuary of Golden Dreams.
- Alexander Blok was a favourite poet of Georgy Sviridov; such works as "Petersburg" (a vocal poem), "Nightly Clouds" (cantata) and "Songs From Hard Times" (concerto) were written to Blok's poetry.
- Yevgania Yosifovna Yakhina and Valentina Ramm set Blok's poems to music.
