= Barbara Heldt =

- Born: February 2, 1940; New York City, U.S.
- Known for: Russian literary criticism

Academic background
- Education: Wellesley College, University of Chicago

Barbara Heldt (born 2 February 1940) is an American emerita professor of Russian at the University of British Columbia. The Heldt Prize, a literary award in her name, was established by the Association for Women in Slavic Studies. She was a member of the editorial board of the series Cambridge Studies in Russian Literature. She is best known for her researches on Russian literature by women, the introduction of gender analysis and feminist perspectives into Slavic studies, and for her translation of Karolina Pavlova's novel A Double Life.

== Early life ==
Barbara Sue Heldt was born on 2 February 1940 at the Sydenham hospital in New York City. Her mother, Margery Sloss, was a New Yorker, while her father Dr John H. Heldt, was from Berlin, Germany. Her brother, John, was born in 1942.

She attended the Woodmere Academy, then took her undergraduate degree at Wellesley College, where she was a Durant scholar. She studied at the Sorbonne in Paris. She then returned to New York to study for a M.A. degree at Columbia University.

Heldt married E. William Monter on 19 June 1963 at Woodmere, Long Island. They had two children: Gustav and Elizabeth.

Having obtained a Ford Foundation Fellowship, she went to the University of Chicago to work towards a doctoral degree in Slavic languages.

She has been married to Gerald Stanton Smith since 1982.

== Career ==
In 1961, between her graduation and starting the master's programme at Columbia, Heldt worked for the US Information Agency in the USSR. She next guided French pharmacists around the US. The money from this work funded the first year of her M.A.

In 1966–67, Heldt studied in Moscow under the Fulbright Program. The next year, her doctoral degree was awarded by the University of Chicago and she was hired as an assistant professor in her department, teaching Russian language and literature. In 1976, she joined the University of British Columbia.

In 1988, the Association for Women in Slavic Studies, formed the previous year, established a series of prizes, one of which, funded by the Association for Slavic, East European, and Eurasian Studies was named the Heldt Prize in her honour.

Heldt became Professor Emerita at the University of British Columbia in 1996.

=== Research ===
Heldt translated Karolina Pavlova's novel A Double Life in 1978. Pavlova, a nineteenth century Russian poet, had been celebrated in her youth but disdained and disregarded later on, and fell out of the canon in Soviet times. Heldt's translation brought new audiences to Pavlova's work, while the feminist perspective she brought into Pavlova's life and times attracted further study by feminist researchers.

Heldt's book Terrible Perfection: Women and Russian Literature (1987) is considered the first view of Russian literary history through feminist theory. Heldt argued that Western feminist critiques of European literature attempted to raise the feminine from conventional attitudes of inferiority, while in Russia, the feminine was held to an impossible perfect standard that terrified men who could not match it in masculine action and suppressed women who couldn't live up to it. Her analysis revealed that Tolstoy was perhaps the only Russian author who achieved a sort of feminist comprehension of women. Meanwhile, Russian women entered the literary sphere in fewer numbers than their western European counterparts and did so mainly in the genres of poetry and memoirs.

== Selected works ==
=== Books ===
- Koz'ma Prutkov, the Art of Parody. De Gruyter Mouton. 1972.
- (Translation) Karolina Pavlova (1986). A Double Life. Barbary Coast.
- Terrible Perfection: Women and Russian Literature. Indiana University. 1987.

=== Articles ===
- Monter, Barbara Heldt (1973). "The Quality of Dostoevskij's Humor: The Village of Stepancikovo". Slavic and East European Journal. 17 (1): 33–41. doi:10.2307/306543. JSTOR 306543.
- Monter, Barbara Heldt (1977). "Rassvet (1859-1862) and the Woman Question". Slavic Review. 36 (1): 76–85. doi:10.2307/2494672. JSTOR 2494672.
- Heldt, Barbara (1989). "The Poetry of Elena Shvarts". World Literature Today. 63 (3): 381–383. doi:10.2307/40145308. JSTOR 40145308.
- Heldt, Barbara; Shkapskaia, Mariia (1992). "Motherhood in a Cold Climate: The Poetry and Career of Mariia Shkapskaia". The Russian Review. 51 (2): 160–171. doi:10.2307/130691. JSTOR 130691.
