= Karolina Pavlova =

Russian poet and novelist (1807–1893)

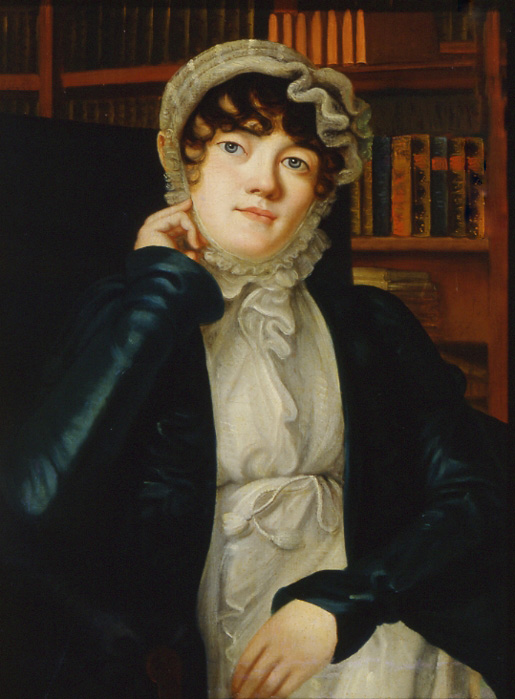
- Born: 22 July 1807; Yaroslavl, Russia
- Died: 14 December 1893 (aged 86); Dresden, Germany
- Occupations: Poet; writer

Karolina Karlovna Pavlova (Russian: Кароли́на Ка́рловна Па́влова; née Yanish; 22 July [O.S. 10 July] 1807 – 14 December [O.S. 2 December] 1893) was a Russian poet and novelist.

== Biography ==
Karolina Karlovna Pavlova (née Jänisch; Russian: Яниш, romanized: Yanish) was born on 22 July [O.S. 10 July] 1807, in Yaroslavl. She was welcomed into the world by her mother Elizaveta, a former singing teacher, as well as her father Karl Ivanovich Jaenisch a professor of physics and chemistry at the School of Medicine and Surgery in Moscow. The Jaenisch family had a diverse array of ethnic heritage, spanning from German on Pavlova’s father’s side, to French and English on her mother’s side. With her family’s background Pavlova was homeschooled with a European education, which led to her prowess in linguistics. By the age of 18, Pavlova was fluent in Russian, French, English, Spanish and German, and was also proficient in both Polish and Italian.

In the mid-1820s, Pavlova obtained her first invitation to read her poetry at the salon of Avdot'ia Elagina, a close friend of her father. This introduction extended Pavlovas’ literary connections, eventually leading to her attending the illustrious salon of Princess Zinaida Volkonskaia.Here she met well known authors like Pushkin. In 1825, at Volkonskaias’ salon, Pavlova was introduced to Adam Mickiewicz, a prominent Polish poet. "Stunned by her literary talents," Mickiewicz would become Pavlovas' Polish tutor as well as her lover. On 10 November 1827, Mickiewicz proposed to Pavlova. Unfortunately, one of Pavlovas’ wealthy uncles didn’t approve of the match and threatened to remove Pavlova and her family from the inheritance.

She was married in 1837 to Nikolai Filippovich Pavlov, who admitted he married her for her money. Pavlova had a son, Ippolit. For years they ran a literary salon in Moscow that was visited by both Westernizers and Slavophiles. Pavlova's husband gambled her inheritance away and began living with her younger cousin in another household he had set up. The marriage ended in 1853. She went to Saint Petersburg, where her father had just died in a cholera outbreak. From there she went to Dorpat (now Tartu, Estonia) to live with her mother and son. There she met Boris Utin, the "profoundest love of her life." In January 1854, Pavlova's son went back to live with his father in Moscow and go to the university there.

Pavlova settled in Dresden, Germany, in 1858. There Aleksey Tolstoy visited Pavlova, who was working not only as a poet, but also as a translator among Russian, French and German. She translated his poetry and plays into German. He in turn secured a pension for her from the Russian government and corresponded warmly and solicitously with her until his death in 1875. Pavlova died in Dresden in 1893.

Although Pavlova's poetry was poorly accepted by her contemporaries, it was rediscovered in the 1900s by the symbolists. Valery Bryusov combined Pavlova's work into two volumes which he published in 1915. Pavlova was called the "master of Russian verse" by Andrei Bely, who placed her in the same category as Zhukovsky, Baratynsky, and Fet.

The Sphinx, written in 1831, was Karolina's first poem in Russian. Some of her other works include: A Conversation at Trianon (1848), A Conversation at the Kremlin (1854), and the elegy Life Calls Us (1846).

=== Gender barriers ===
In 19th-century Russia, the literature being produced "equalled that written at any place at any time in history," but most famous authors were male. Although she was a poet who helped Russian poetry transcend national borders with her translations, Pavlova was a female poet living in a man's world. Even when they admired her poetry her literary friends composed condescending memoirs, articles or private letters condemning Pavlova. Her poetry was heavily criticized in The Contemporary, and she was forced to leave her native country because of the overwhelming, negative criticism of her poetry. In a letter written in response to the criticism, Pavlova explains that "a woman-poet always remains more woman than poet and authorial egotism in her is weaker than female egotism."

== A Double Life ==
Karolina Pavlova finished her only novel, A Double Life (Russian: Двойная жизнь), in 1848. It is a ten-chapter novel that mixes prose and poetry to illustrate the duality of women and of members of high society. The heroine of the novel is Cecily von Lindenborn. While Cecily has an undeniable, secret yearning for poetry, women poets were "always presented to her as the most pitiable, abnormal state, as a disastrous and dangerous illness." The poetry is symbolic of the inner world of Cecily. Like most other Russian novels of the time, Pavlova's novel is situated in the aristocratic world. Cecily, a member of this world, has been so carefully brought up that "she could never commit the slightest peccadillo ... could never forget herself for a moment, raise her voice half a tone ... enjoy a conversation with a man to the point where she might talk to him ten minutes longer than was proper, or look to the right when she was supposed to look to the left." She is lured into the respectable yet meaningless life of a woman of high society and into marriage by the people that are closest to her, yet, her dreams, which come to her in the form of poems, have warned her.

== Bibliography ==
- A Double Life (A novel in prose and poetry; 1846); Ardis, 1978 ISBN 978-0-88233-223-9
- The Crone (ballad, 1840), Life Calls Us (elegy, 1846) and At the Tea-Table (story, 1859), from An Anthology of Russian Women's Writing, 177-1992, Oxford, 1994. ISBN 0-19-871505-6
- A Double Life, Columbia University Press, 2019 (The Russian Library). Translated by Barbara Heldt. ISBN 978-0-23119079-4

== Sources ==
- "Павлова, Каролина Карловна" . Brockhaus and Efron Encyclopedic Dictionary (in Russian). 1906.
- Heldt, Barbara. 1978. "Karolina Pavlova: The woman Poet and the Double Life." Oakland: Barbary Coast Books.
- Peace, Richard. 1992. "The nineteenth century: the natural school and its aftermath, 1840–55". The Cambridge History of Russian Literature, ed. Charles A. Moser. New York: Cambridge University Press.
- Terras, Victor, ed. 1985. Handbook of Russian Literature. New Haven: Yale University Press.
- Terras, Victor. 1991. A History of Russian Literature. Castleton, N.Y.: Hamilton Printing Co. p. 225-226
- Susanne Fusso; Alexander Lehrman, eds. (2001). Essays on Karolina Pavlova. Northwestern University Press. ISBN 978-0-8101-1544-6.
- Diana Greene (2004). "Karolina Pavlova". Reinventing romantic poetry: Russian women poets of the mid-nineteenth century. Univ of Wisconsin Press. ISBN 978-0-299-19104-7.
