= Andrei Sen-Senkov =

Russian poet and writer (born 1968)

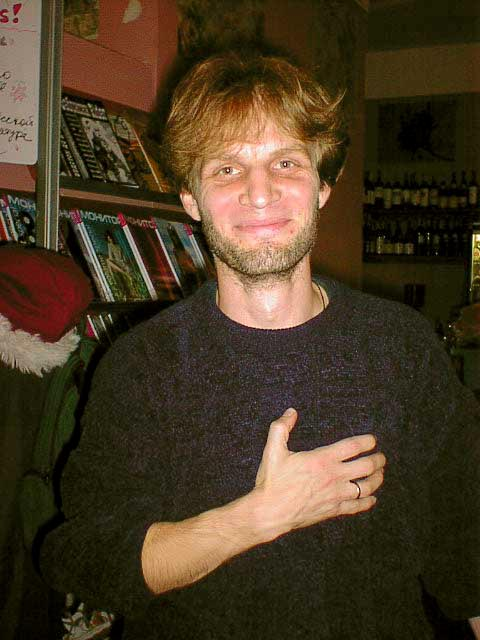
Poet Andrey Sen-Senkov at the Biennial of Poets in Moscow, 19 Oct. 2001.

Andrei Sen-Senkov is a Russian poet and writer, born in Tajikistan in 1968.

He received a degree in medicine from Yaroslavl State Medical Academy, then lived in the old Russian city of Borisoglebsk before settling in Moscow in 2001. Sen-Senkov has been published in numerous literary journals in Russia and abroad; he has published seven books of poetry, prose poems and visual poetry. Sen-Senkov's work has been translated into English, Italian, Serbian, Montenegrin, German, French, Estonian, Albanian, Dutch, Ukrainian, Slovenian and Polish. He was awarded the Turgenev Festival Prize for short prose in 1998 and in 2006 was nominated for the Andrei Bely Prize.

Sen-Senkov work takes many forms: he writes poetry, short prose cycles and visual poetry, and has collaborated with sound and video artists. He has been quoted saying that "the poem lives inside of me, small, naked, formless...you always write about one and the same thing, just with different words."

== Selected publications ==
- Slash (ARGO-RISK Press: Moscow, 2008; in collaboration with Alexei Tsvetkov Jr.)
- A God Suffering from Astrophilia (New Literary Observer Press: Moscow, 2008).
- Anatomical Theater (Zephyr Press: 2013; translated by Ainsley Morse and Peter Golub), an English collection of his work
