= Pyotr Toburokov =

Petr Nikolayevich Toburokov (Russian: Петр Николаевич Тобуроков, 25 October 1917 – 6 March 2001) was a Russian poet and writer from Yakutia.
