= VNIITE =

Soviet design research institute

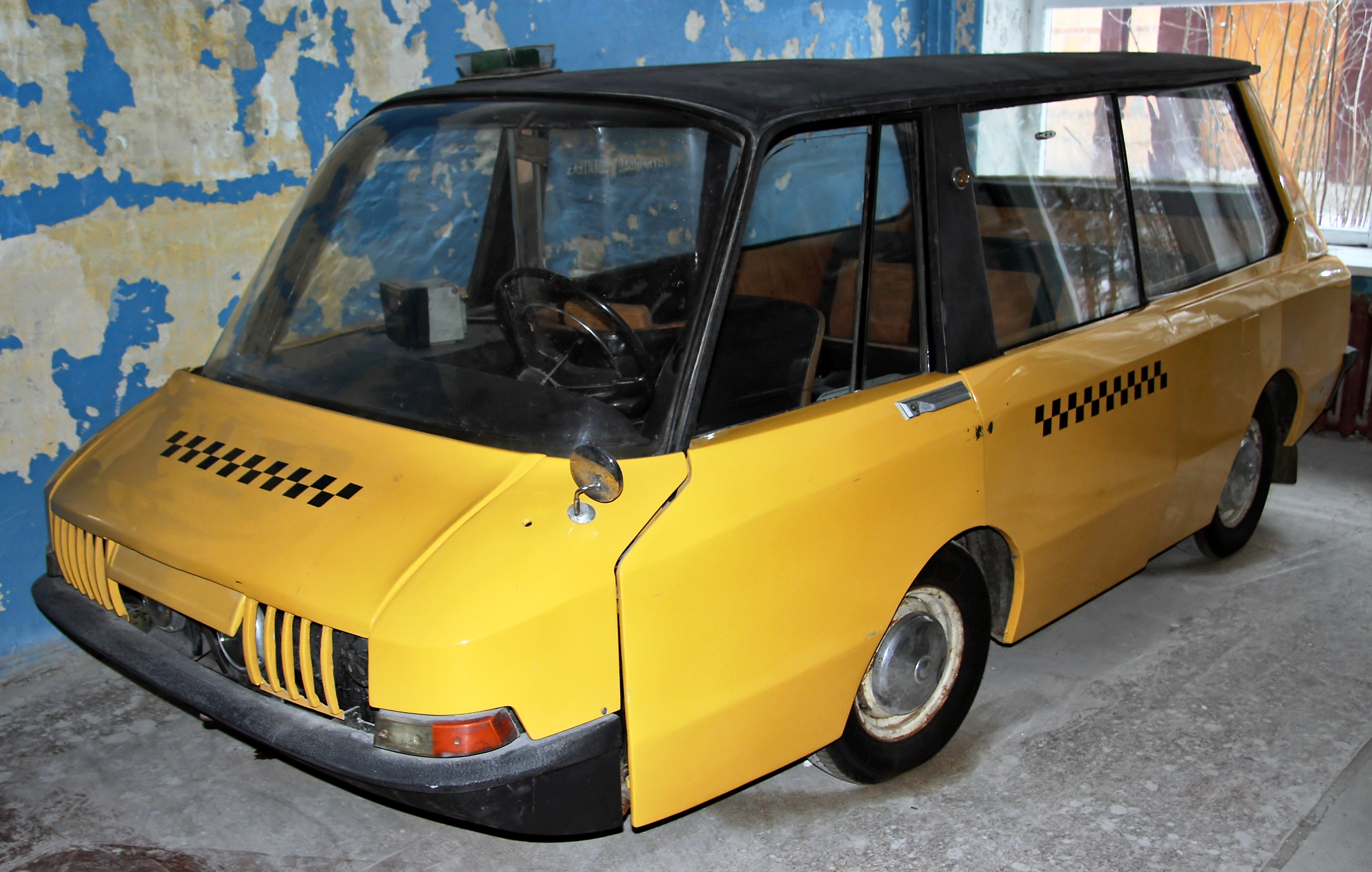
VNIITE-PT taxi prototype, designed by the transports division of the VNIITE institute in 1964

VNIITE (Russian: ВНИИТЭ), named after the acronym for the All-Union Scientific Research Institute of Industrial Design (Russian: Всесоюзный научно-исследовательский институт технической эстетики), was the chief Soviet design research institute, established in April 1962, and closed in June 2013. It was created at the request of the State Committee on Science and Engineering of the Council of Ministers of the USSR. One its main objectives was to improve the quality of the design of Soviet products, in order to decrease the gap between the Soviet Union and the industrial power of Western countries.

== History ==
When they first opened, the headquarters of the institute in Moscow were divided into nine key sections: Human Resources; Design Theory and History; Design Promotion; Ergonomics; Materials, Colors and Finish; Information; Transportation Design; Consumer Product Design and Industrial Equipment Design. After five years, the VNIITE employed a workforce of 3,000 employees, with 15 branches spread across the Soviet Union. Large design offices (of 50 to 200 employees) were attached to the main industries, and other 200 smaller laboratories worked with individual factories.

Almost none of the designs created by the VNIITE during its first period were ever produced industrially, but their concepts were used to show the power of design, and the prototypes were displayed in exhibitions. These initial concepts were for the most part directed towards industrial equipment, office furniture, transportation, and some consumer goods. From 1964 on, the VNIITE produced its own magazine, called Technical Aesthetics (a term invented in Russia to speak about industrial design).

From the mid-1970s, the institute focused on a greater integration with the economies of the Eastern Bloc countries, and in particular with East Germany and Czechoslovakia.

== Notable designers ==
Designer Yuri Soloviev directed the VNIITE from its opening in 1962 to 1982, and he was a key figure to its development. When opening, as design was not an established field in Russia, the first employees hired by him were engineers, psychologists, historians, graphics, model-makers and other design aficionados. However, some of them were revealed to be competent designers, including Boris Shekov (who became head of the Industrial Equipment Design department) and Yuri Dolmatovsky, who worked on the Transports department.

== See also ==
- Sphinx (home automation system), a prototype designed by the VNIITE designers in 1987
