= Vsevolod Zelchenko =

Russian poet (born 1972)

Vsevolod Vladimirovich Zelchenko (Russian: Всеволод Владимирович Зельченко, born 25 September 1972) is a Russian poet. He is considered one of the most significant contemporary Russian poets.

An anecdote in a book by Vyacheslav Leikin tells of Zelchenko, at age 11, being chosen to appear in an Italian film reciting Pushkin after impressing an unnamed "famous director" with his early poetic talent. Zelchenko graduated from Saint Petersburg State University in 1994. In 2003 he received a Candidate of Sciences degree in literature. Zelchenko is an associate professor of Saint Petersburg State University, and a school teacher of Latin and Greek. He is also a translator from Ancient Greek, concentrating on newly discovered texts.

In poetry, one of the specialities of Zelchenko are centos. He experienced an influence of English ballades, in particular, through earlier Russian translations.

== Oeuvres ==
Zelchenko published three books of poetry, all in the 1990s. He stated that he wrote too little poetry in the 2000s, which was not enough to compose a fourth book.

- Kollazh (Коллаж, 1991).
- Iz Afriki (Из Африки: Стихи, 1994).
- Voysko (Войско: Стихотворения, 1997).
