= Semyon Gudzenko =

Soviet poet (1922–1953)

Semyon Petrovich Gudzenko (Russian: Семён Петрович Гудзенко) (born Sario Gudzenko; 5 March 1922, in Kyiv – 2 December 1953, in Moscow) was a Soviet Russian poet of Ukrainian-Jewish origin, of the World War II generation. He is often compared with Pavel Kogan and Semen Kirsanov.

He died from old war wounds as he himself predicted in one of his own poems.

Gudzenko studied at the Moscow Institute of History, Philosophy, and Literature during 1939–41. He developed as a poet during the years of the Great Patriotic War. His first anthology, Regiment Comrades (1944), sounded the courageous voice of an ordinary participant in great events, one who knows the harsh truth of war. The narrative poem The Remote Garrison(1950) tells of the everyday working life of the Soviet Army in peace time. Gudzenko is the author of the anthologies After the March (1947), Transcarpathian Verses (1948), and the cycle of poems Train to Tuva (1949).

Awards: Medal "For the Victory over Germany in the Great Patriotic War 1941–1945", Order of the Red Star, Order of the Patriotic War 2nd class, Medal "For the Defence of Moscow", Medal "For the Capture of Budapest".
