= Lyubov Blok =

Russian actress, historian and memoirist (1881-1939)

- Любовь Дмитриевна Блок
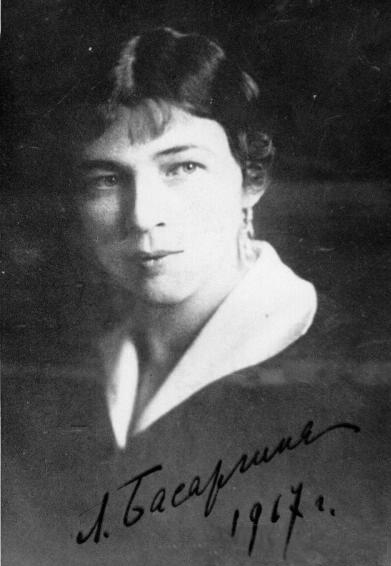
- Blok in 1917, signed with her stage name Lyubov Basargina
- Born: Lyubov Dmitrievna Mendeleeva; 29 December 1881; Saint Petersburg, Russian Empire
- Died: 27 September 1939 (aged 57); Leningrad, Soviet Union
- Occupations: Actress, ballet historian, memoirist
- Spouse: Alexander Blok (m. 1903; died 1921)
- Parent(s): Dmitri Mendeleev (father); Anna Ivanovna Popova (mother)

Lyubov Dmitrievna Blok (née Mendeleeva; 29 December 1881 – 27 September 1939) was a Russian drama actress of the Silver Age, a Soviet ballet historian, and a memoirist. She was the daughter of the chemist Dmitri Mendeleev and married to the poet Alexander Blok.

== Biography ==
Blok was born in Saint Petersburg into the family of the Russian chemist Dmitry Ivanovich Mendeleev and Anna Ivanovna Mendeleeva (née Popova). She completed her secondary education at the Schaffe Gymnasium, graduating with a medal. After subsequently graduating from the Bestuzhev Courses, she pursued dramatic instruction under A. M. Chitau, an actress of the Alexandrinsky Theatre.

She developed an early interest in the theatre, participating in amateur productions. She met Alexander Blok during an amateur play staged at the Mendeleev family estate in Boblovo, which was located a few kilometers from the Blok country estate in Shakhmatovo. Her theatrical career included brief tenures at the Vera Komissarzhevskaya Theatre, the Yavorskaya Theatre, and various provincial venues under the stage pseudonym Basargina, a surname derived from her paternal aunt, Olga Ivanovna, who was married to the Decembrist Nikolay Basargin. In 1903, she married Alexander Alexandrovich Blok, with the marriage solemnized on 17 August 1903 at the Church of Michael the Archangel in Tarakanovo, followed by a reception at the Mendeleev estate.

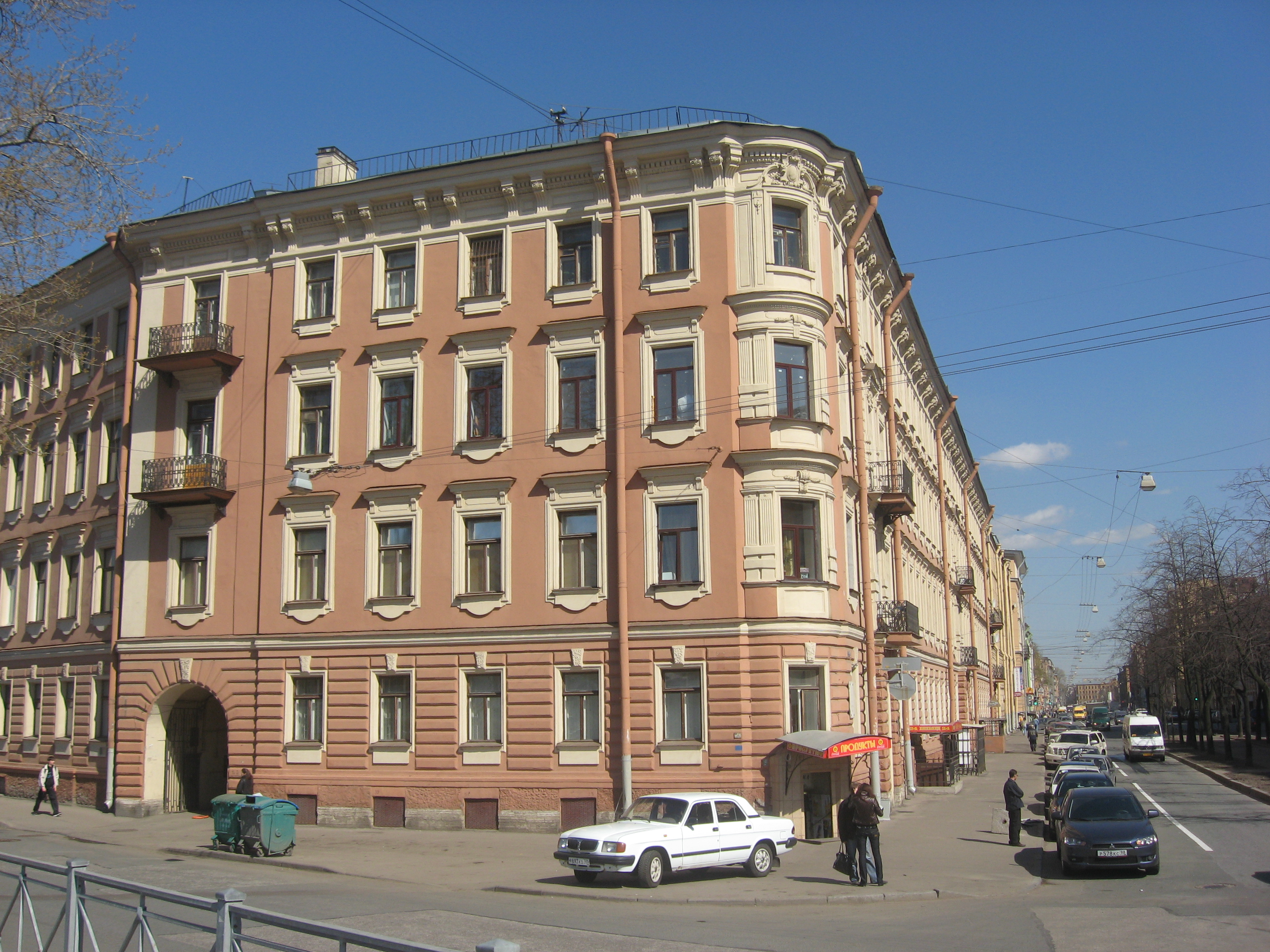
Apartment (with the top-floor balcony) where Lyubov Blok lived from 1912 to 1939 and her husband until his death in 1921. It is now the Blok Apartment Museum

Blok served as the primary inspiration for Alexander Blok's poetic cycle Verses About the Beautiful Lady. The poet Andrei Bely was also romantically attached to her for many years, though his courtship remained unrequited. This love triangle closely influenced the composition of Blok's drama The Rose and the Cross. In 1909, she gave birth to a son who died eight days later, after which the couple traveled through Italy to recuperate. From 1912 until her death, she resided in an apartment on Dekabristov Street, which later became the Blok Museum-Apartment.

During World War I, she served as a sister of mercy. Following the 1917 revolution, Alexander Blok suffered from progressive depression, though he remained devoted to his wife until his death in 1921. Between 1920 and 1921, she frequently recited Blok's poem The Twelve at Sergey Radlov's Theatre of Popular Comedy before audiences of workers and Red Army soldiers.

Her subsequent career in the 1930s focused on balletic historiography. She authored The Origin and Development of Classical Dance Technique (1939), an analytical study that served as a foundation for her posthumously published definitive work, Classical Dance: History and Present (1987). She also produced her personal memoirs, Both Fact and Fiction about Blok and Myself.

Blok died in Leningrad in 1939. Originally interred at the Volkovo Lutheran Cemetery, her remains, along with those of her husband, were transferred to the Literatorskie Mostki section of the Volkovo Cemetery in 1944, positioned near the grave of her father.

== Roles ==
| Year | Production | Role | Venue |
|---|---|---|---|
| 1915 | Guilty Without Guilt (Aleksandr Ostrovsky) | Kruchinina | Society of Fine Arts |
| 1919 | Kabale und Liebe (Friedrich Schiller) | Lady Milford | Hermitage Theatre |
| 1921 | The Merry Wives of Windsor (William Shakespeare) | — | Theatre of Popular Comedy |

== Sources ==
- Bely, A.; Metner, E. (2017). Lavrov, A. V. (ed.). Андрей Белый и Эмилий Метнер. Переписка. 1902–1915 [Andrey Bely and Emiliy Metner. Correspondence. 1902–1915] (PDF) (in Russian). Moscow: Novoe literaturnoe obozrenie. ISBN 978-5-4448-0870-2.
- Blok, L. D. (1979). И быль, и небылицы о Блоке и о себе [Fact and Fiction About Blok and Myself] (PDF). Bremen: Kafka-Press.
- Blok, L. D. (1987). Классический танец: История и современность [Classical Dance: History and Present]. Moscow: Iskusstvo.
- Blok, L. D. (2019) [First published 1939]. Возникновение и развитие техники классического танца [The Origin and Development of Classical Dance Technique]. Moscow: Urayt.
- Galanina, Yu. E. (2009). Любовь Дмитриевна Блок: Судьба и сцена [Lyubov Dmitrievna Blok: Destiny and the Stage]. Moscow: Progress-Pleyada. ISBN 978-5-93006-085-0.
- Kireev, R. T. (2007). ""Да, уеду. Да, люблю": Андрей Белый и Любовь Менделеева-Блок" ["Yes, I Will Leave. Yes, I Love": Andrei Bely and Lyubov Mendeleeva-Blok]. Пленники муз: Как любили великие поэты [Captives of the Muses: How the Great Poets Loved]. Moscow. pp. 234–241.
- Kobak, A. V.; Piryutko, Yu. M. (2011). Исторические кладбища Санкт-Петербурга [Historical Cemeteries of Saint Petersburg] (2nd ed.). Moscow: Centrpoligraf. ISBN 978-5-227-02688-0.
- А. А. Блок — Л. Д. Менделеева-Блок: переписка, 1901–1917 [A. A. Blok – L. D. Mendeleeva-Blok: Correspondence, 1901–1917]. Moscow: IMLI RAN. 2017. ISBN 978-5-9208-0529-4.
