= Peredelkino =

Dacha complex in Moscow Oblast, Russia

Peredelkino Переделкино
- Dacha settlement
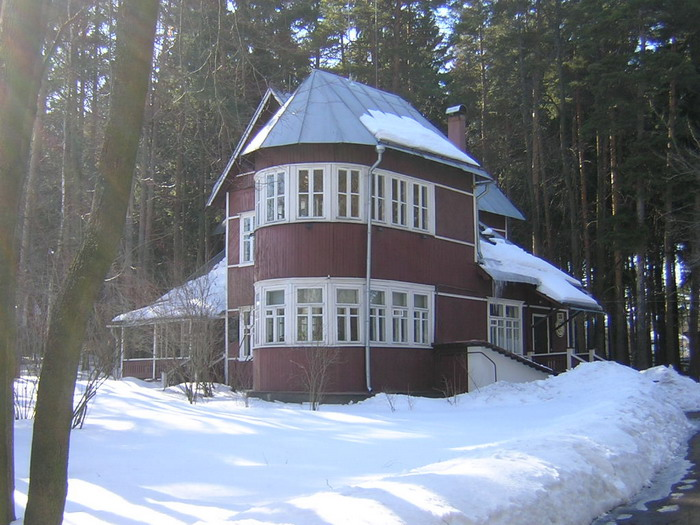
- House-museum of Boris Pasternak in Peredelkino
- Interactive map of Peredelkino
- Location of Peredelkino Peredelkino (Moscow)
- Coordinates: 55°39′28″N 37°21′08″E
- Country: Russia
- Federal subject: Moscow
- Administrative district: Novomoskovsky Administrative Okrug
- First mentioned: 1646
- Current status since: 1984

Municipal status
  - Municipal district: Vnukovo District
- Postal code: 142784

Peredelkino (Russian: Переделкино, IPA: [pʲɪrʲɪˈdʲelkʲɪnə]) is a dacha complex situated in Odintsovsky District of Moscow Oblast, Russia.

== History ==
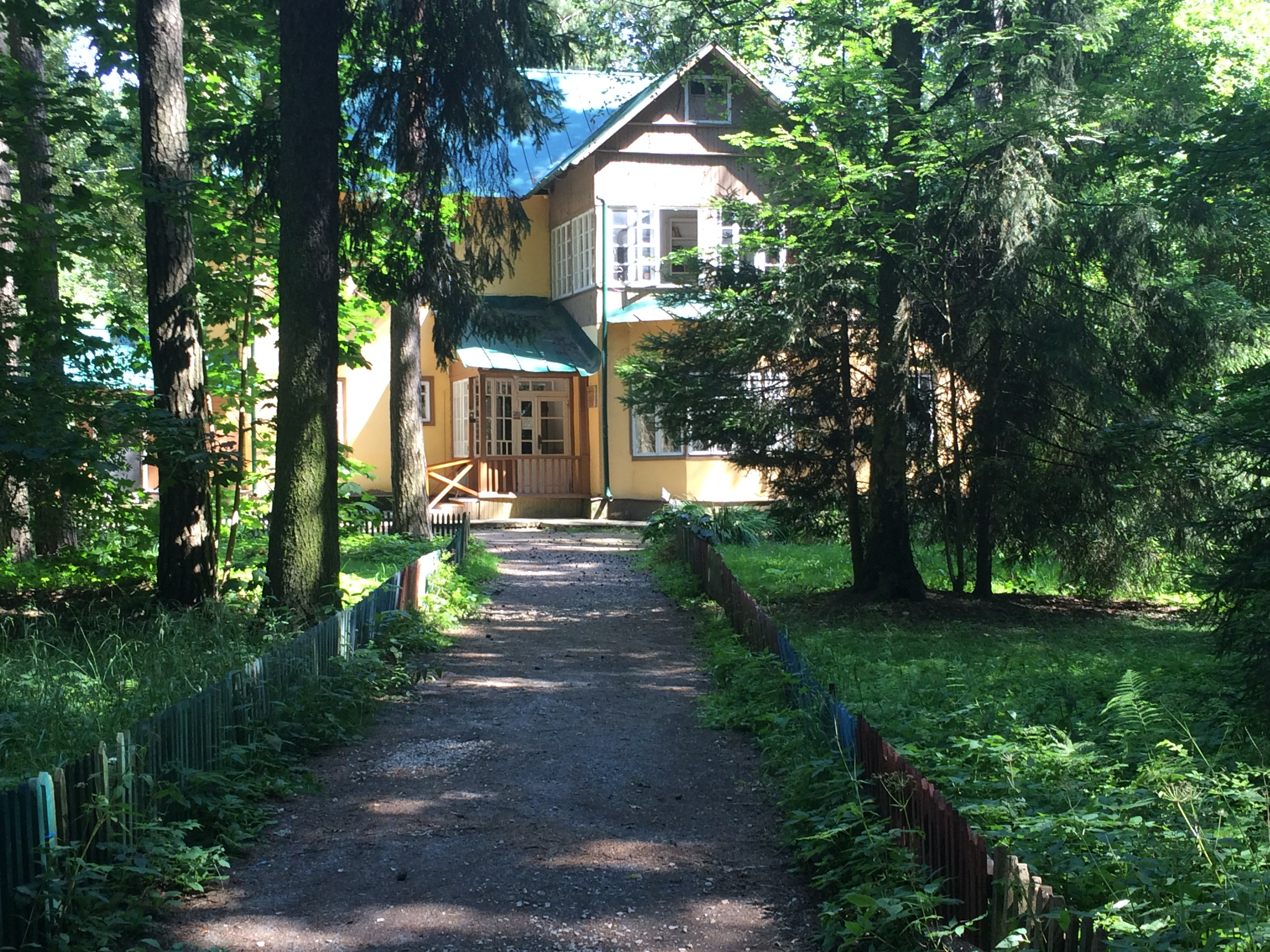
House-Museum of Korney Chukovsky

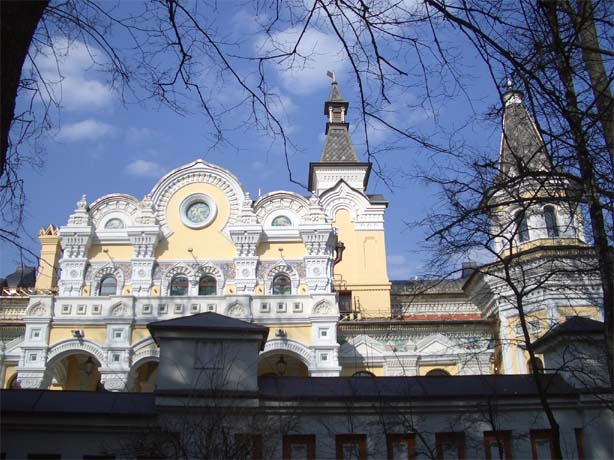
Country residence of Moscow Patriarchs

The settlement originated as the estate of Peredeltsy, owned by the Leontievs (maternal relatives of Peter the Great), then by Princes Dolgorukov and by the Samarins. After a railway passed through the village in the 19th century, it was renamed Peredelkino.

In 1934, Maxim Gorky suggested handing over the area to the Union of Soviet Writers. Within several years, about fifty wooden cottages designed by German architect Ernst May were constructed in Peredelkino by writers. The curator of the project was Soviet politician Aleksandr Shcherbakov.

Among the first residents of the colony were poet Boris Pasternak, writers Korney Chukovsky, Isaac Babel, Alexander Serafimovich, Leonid Leonov, Ilya Ehrenburg, Boris Pilnyak, Vsevolod Ivanov, Lev Kassil, Konstantin Fedin, Ilya Ilf, Yevgeny Petrov, Soviet politician Lev Kamenev.

On May 15, 1939, during Stalin's Great Purge, author and playwright Isaac Babel was arrested at his dacha in Peredelkino. Babel was taken by automobile to the Lubyanka Prison, tortured, and eventually shot by the NKVD.

After World War II, twenty more writer's cottages were built. Among the new residents were Veniamin Kaverin, Nikolay Zabolotsky (was not an owner but rented a cottage), Valentin Kataev, Alexander Fadeyev, Konstantin Simonov. Later more writers and poets moved to the village including Yevgeny Yevtushenko, Andrei Voznesensky, Bulat Okudzhava, Bella Akhmadulina and many others. In 1965-1975 Soviet dissident writer Aleksandr Solzhenitsyn often lived in Chukovsky's cottage.

In 1952 due to the 75-year birthday of Patriarch Alexy I of Moscow the residence of Moscow Patriarchs was opened in Peredelkino. In 1995-2000 the residence was significantly extended.

In 1988 the village received the official status of Historical-Cultural Reserve. The same year the Museums of Korney Chukovsky and of Boris Pasternak were opened in the correspondent cottages. In 1997 another Museum was opened in Bulat Okudzhava's cottage.

== Cultural references ==
Peredelkino is presumably one of the sources for the name of a factious writer's colony Perelygino from Mikhail Bulgakov's novel The Master and Margarita. In the earlier drafts of the novel the name was Perevrakion - the village of liars. Perelygino has a similar meaning but it is slightly masked. Note that Bulgakov places his Perelygino on the Klyazma, Bolshevo, which is where another writers' colony was. Thus, Bolshevo can be another source of Bulgakov's inspiration

Portions of the 1990 film The Russia House were filmed in Peredelkino, including at Pasternak's house and his grave.

== See also ==
- Komarovo
