= Evgeny Schwartz =

Russian playwright

- Born: Evgeny Lvovich Schwartz; 21 October [O.S. 9 October] 1896; Kazan, Russian Empire
- Died: January 15, 1958 (aged 61); Leningrad, Soviet Union
- Occupations: Editor, novelist and playwright
- Writing career
- Years active: 1924–1957
- Period: Avant-garde

Evgeny Lvovich Schwartz (Russian: Евге́ний Льво́вич Шва́рц; 21 October [O.S. 9 October] 1896, in Kazan, Russian Empire – January 15, 1958, in Leningrad, Soviet Union) was a Soviet writer and playwright, whose works include twenty-five plays, and screenplays for three films (in collaboration with Nikolai Erdman).

== Life ==
=== Early life ===
Evgeny Schwartz was born in Kazan, Russia, into a physician's family. His father was baptized and was of Jewish origin and his mother Russian. In 1910 he studied law at Moscow University, where he also became involved in theater and poetry. He was drafted into the army at the end of 1916 to serve on the front. After the Bolshevik Revolution he joined the Whites and served under general Kornilov. He suffered injuries and shell-shock during the storming of Yekaterinodar in 1918, lost several teeth and acquired a tremor of the hands that plagued him for the rest of his life.

After the end of Russian Civil War, Schwartz studied theater in Rostov-on-Don. In 1921 he moved with the theater troupe to Petrograd, becoming involved with the "Serapion Brothers," a literary group including Ivanov, Zoshchenko and Kaverin. In 1923 he moved to Bakhmut and began to publish satirical verse and reviews in the local newspaper. With Mikhail Slonimsky and Nikolay Oleynikov, he organized the literary magazine Slaughter in 1925.

=== Career ===
In 1924, Schwartz returned to Leningrad to become an employee of Gosizdat, Children's Department of State Publishing House, under the administration of Samuil Marshak. He became an author of the children's magazines Hedgehog and Siskin. He also wrote children's books, including The Story of Old Balalaika (1924), The Adventures of Shura and Marousi (1937), Alien Girl (1937) and First Grader (1949). During this time, he also became associated with members of the avant-garde literary group OBERIU.

In 1929 Evgeny Schwartz began collaborating with Nikolay Akimov at the Leningrad Comedy Theater, writing contemporary plays based on the folk and fairy tales of Hans Christian Andersen. These included Golyi korol (The Emperor's New Clothes) (1934), Krasnaya Shapochka (Little Red Riding Hood) (1936), Zolushka (Cinderella) (1938), Snezhnaya Koroleva (The Snow Queen, after Hans Christian Andersen) (1938), Tyen (The Shadow, after Hans Christian Andersen) (1940), Drakon (The Dragon, an original) (1944), and Obyknovennoye Chudo (An Ordinary Miracle) (1956). At the beginning of World War II, Schwartz wrote Under the Linden Trees of Berlin (1941) with Zoschenko. During the war, he wrote One Night and The Far Country.

After the war, Schwartz wrote An Ordinary Miracle and The Tale of the Brave Soldiers. Schwartz's adaptations of The Snow Queen and The Shadow were adapted as movies in 1966 and 1971. He also completed film scripts for Cinderella, First Grader, Don Quixote and Ordinary Miracle. During Joseph Stalin's campaign against the so-called "rootless cosmopolitans" (Jews), from 1952 to 1954 his plays were not accepted for production by theatres. After 20th Congress of the CPSU baseless criticism has ceased. He died in Leningrad.

== Plays ==
=== The Dragon ===
In 1944, Schwartz completed the fairytale play The Dragon, a piece of political satire seen as subversive in the political climate of the post-World War II Soviet Union and was banned by Soviet censorship for a long time (although there were two attempts to stage it by Nikolay Akimov, in 1944 and 1962). The play tells the story of the knight Lancelot, who sets out to slay the dragon. However, in his quest, he stumbles on a community governed by a bureaucratic hierarchy using the dragon to cover their own use of power. In 1985 an opera based on the play was composed by the Swiss composer Jost Meier and a filmed version, To Kill a Dragon, was produced in 1988.

This play, the most "mature" of Schwartz's plays, is a political satire aimed at totalitarianism in all forms. The plot is based on the attempt of the hero, Lancelot, to liberate people in a land suffering under Dragon's brutal rule. But his efforts meet with resistance, since most of the people have gotten used to the Dragon and considered his methods, though harsh, the only possible way; their souls become, in a way, crippled with this inability and unwillingness to resist. Says the Dragon in the play: "You see, the human soul is very resilient. Cut the body in half — and the man croaks. But tear the soul apart — and it only becomes more pliable, that's all. No, really, you couldn't pick a finer assortment of souls anywhere. Only in my town. Souls with no hands. Souls with no legs. Mute souls, deaf souls, chained souls, snitch souls, damned souls."

Lancelot killing the Dragon in a fight did not free the people; all that changed was the Burgomaster acceding to the position formerly occupied by the Dragon and demanding that Elsa, the same girl who was destined to be sacrificed to the Dragon, become his wife. When Lancelot returns to the town a year later, he realizes that his task is much more complex: "This is going to be a very meticulous job... We have to kill the dragon in each one of them."

=== An Ordinary Miracle ===
An Ordinary Miracle starts as a comical story of an inept wizard, whose actions always produce not what he intended. Eventually it turns into a romantic, tragic, and philosophical parable on love of a man who was turned from a bear by the wizard and a princess. The play was made into films in 1964 and in 1978.

== Filmography ==
=== Written by Schwartz ===
- Doctor Aybolit (1938)
- A Winter Tale (animated, 1945)
- Cinderella (1947)
- First-Year Student (1948)
- Don Quixote (1957)
- The Magic Weaver (1960)

=== Based on Schwartz's works ===
- Little Red Riding Hood (1962)
- Cain XVIII (1963)
- An Ordinary Miracle (1964)
- Tale About the Lost Time (1964)
- The Snow Queen (1967)
- The Shadow (1971)
- An Ordinary Miracle (1964 film)
- An Ordinary Miracle (1978 film)
- Tale About the Lost Time (animated, 1978)
- Die verzauberten Brüder (TV, 1978)
- To Kill a Dragon (1989)
- The Shadow, or, Maybe It's All Right (1991)
- "The Two Brothers", an episode of Animated Tales of the World (animated, 2001)
- A New Year Adventure of Two Brothers (animated, 2004)
