= Elizaveta Polonskaya =

Russian poet, translator and journalist (1890–1969)

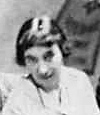
- Born: Elizaveta Grigorevna Movshenson; June 26, 1890; Warsaw, Congress Poland
- Died: January 11, 1969 (aged 78); Russia
- Education: Sorbonne
- Occupations: Poet, journalist
- Partner: Lev Davidovich Polonsky
- Children: Mikhail
- Writing career
- Language: Russian

Elizaveta Grigorevna Polonskaya (Russian: Елизаве́та Григо́рьевна Поло́нская, IPA: [jɪlʲɪzɐˈvʲɛtə pɐˈlonskəjə]), born Movshenson (Russian: Мовшенсо́н; June 26 [O.S. June 14] 1890 – January 11, 1969), was a Russian poet, translator, and journalist, the only female member of the Serapion Brothers.

== Early life ==
Elizaveta (Liza) Movshenson was born in Warsaw (in Congress Poland, part of the Russian Empire); her father, Grigory Lvovich Movshenson, was an engineer who had graduated with high honors from the Riga Polytechnical Institute and her mother, Charlotta Ilinichna (née Meylakh), came from a large Jewish merchant family in Białystok. Her family's first language was Russian, but Liza was also taught French, German, Italian, and English. Because of her father's status, he was granted the right to live outside the Pale of Settlement, and the family moved quite often. Just after Liza's birth, they moved to Łódź, where she spent most of her childhood. Movshenson was formally educated at the women's gymnasium where she became interested in politics. Movshenson joined (with the help of her mother) secret groups studying Belinsky and political economy. However, she also studied Judaism with a rabbi, and "not only the stories themselves but also the biblical language (albeit in Russian translation) made a deep impression on her; her solemn, rhetorical verse is often marked by Slavonicisms."

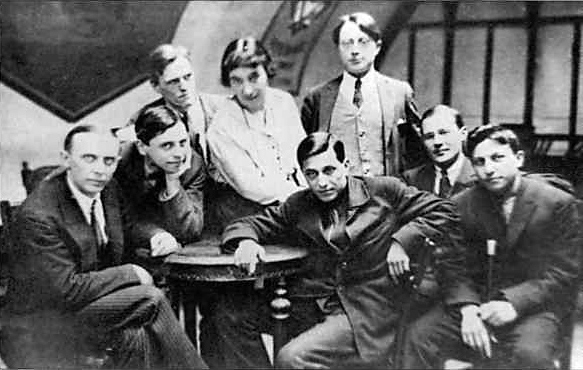
The Serapion Brothers (use a cursor to see who is who)

Worried by the 1905 pogroms, her father sent Liza, her mother, and her brother Alexander to Berlin, where Charlotta's sister Fanny lived; there Liza joined another young people's study group, where she first read Marx. The following year the family moved to St. Petersburg, where she began to work for the Bolshevik cell in the Semyannikov section of the Nevskaya Zastava district, occasionally being sent to Finland to pick up leaflets from Vladimir Lenin to distribute in St. Petersburg. In 1908, in order to avoid arrest and to further her education, she went to Paris, where she enrolled in the medical school of the Sorbonne. She attended meetings of the Russian Social Democratic Labor Party, where she met young people who shared her love of poetry and introduced her to the Russian symbolist poets, who made a deep impression on her. In 1909 these friends introduced her to Ilya Ehrenburg, a meeting that was significant for both of them. For a time they were inseparable, and it was she who introduced Ehrenburg to modern poetry and inspired his first verses, as he describes in his memoirs. Leslie Dorfman Davis writes: "Aside from poetry, Erenburg and Movšenson shared a satirical impulse which provoked disapproval from some of their older comrades. [...] Movšenson and Erenburg [jointly] published two journals, Byvšie ljudi (Former People) and Tixoe semejstvo (A Quiet Family), in which they 'rather caustically, without any sort of reverence, mocked the manners of the Bolshevik circle, insulting even the 'chiefs' (Plexanov, Lenin, Trotskij), and therefore had a sensational response.' [...] Although they quarreled and Erenburg fell in love with another woman, Ekaterina Schmidt, he and Movšenson remained friends and corresponded until his death." While in Paris, Liza became acquainted with both Russian and French writers and drifted away from her affiliation with the Bolsheviks; unlike other members of the émigré community (but like Ehrenburg), she was fluent in French and immersed in the intellectual and artistic life of the city. It was also in Paris that she published her first poems.

In 1914 she graduated from medical school, and after the outbreak of the First World War, she worked for a few months at a hospital in Nancy and then helped run a newly organized military hospital in Neuilly-sur-Seine. In March 1915 she learned that Russian doctors who had trained abroad were being urged to return and receive Russian diplomas so they could serve on the Eastern Front, and she made her way back to Russia via a steamship to Greece and a train through the Balkans. On her arrival in Petrograd, she found her family mourning her father's death; she received her diploma from the University of Tartu and the title of lekar' (physician) in July and went to the Galician front, where she remained until April 1917 supervising an epidemiological division. It was during this period that she met an engineer named Lev Davidovich Polonsky in Kiev; they became lovers and had a son, Mikhail. Although they did not marry (the relationship ended because of another woman to whom he was already engaged), Liza took his family name (she was known as Polonskaya for the rest of her life), and the two kept up a correspondence. He asked her to marry him after his wife died, but she refused, preferring her independence). She left her infant son with her family and briefly returned to the front.

== Career ==
On her final return to Petrograd in the spring of 1917, she had little time for either politics or literature; to support her family, which was in dire straits after her father's death, she took a job as assistant to a municipal charity doctor on Vasilyevsky Island, and was merely a spectator when the October Revolution occurred. From then until the 1930s, she worked in different Soviet medical settings, combining medicine with her writing. By the winter of 1918–19, she was writing in her spare moments, and when she learned (from a streetcar advertisement) of the courses being offered by the Translators' Studio at the publishing house World Literature (Russian: Всемирная литература), newly established by Maxim Gorky, she immediately went to the Muruzi House (Mourousis family House) and signed up for Nikolay Gumilev's poetry class and Viktor Shklovsky's class on literary theory. It was there that she met and befriended the writers who were soon to form the Serapion Brothers; she was particularly close to Lev Lunts, whom she called "the most serapionic" of the group, and shared his insistence on artistic independence and the importance of Western literature (as opposed to the "Scythianism," or Russian exclusivity, that was popular at the time). Even after the slow dissolution of the group (around the time of Lunts's emigration in 1923 and premature death in 1924), she kept in touch with a number of the Serapions and their friends, particularly Veniamin Kaverin and Korney Chukovsky. She published her second verse collection, Pod kammenym dozhdyom (Under a stone rain), in 1923; by the time of her third, Upryamy kalendar' (A stubborn calendar), in 1929, she had begun to move "from strictly lyric poetry to ballads, narrative poems, and literary portraits." From the 1920s she worked as a translator (beginning with Rudyard Kipling's "Ballad of East and West"), bringing into Russian works by Shakespeare, Victor Hugo, Julian Tuwim, and others, as well as the Armenian epic David of Sasun. Chukovsky also helped her establish herself as a poet for children. She wrote the libretto for the children's operetta Chasi by composer Lyubov Streicher.

=== 1930s and 1940s ===
In 1931 Polonskaya gave up the practice of medicine to become a full-time writer, focusing on prose sketches; the turn from creative writing to journalism was common among women poets at the time, for example her friend Maria Shkapskaya. Towards the end of the decade "she was suffering from a worrisome heart condition, which interfered with her work and contributed to recurring bouts of despair," but shortly after the German invasion of Russia she and her family had to leave Leningrad for the Urals, first in Polazna and then (from November 1942) in Molotov. During this period she worked for a time as a school doctor, but on her return to Leningrad in 1944 she became once again a full-time writer.

=== Postwar ===
After the war, she suffered both personal and professional setbacks. In December 1945 her beloved mother had a stroke, dying in January 1946, and her projected novel about the rebuilding of Leningrad, Gorod [The city], was rejected by the publisher, forcing her to return an advance she had already spent (she managed to get Litfond, the writers' literary fund, to pay the advance in exchange for literary work). Furthermore, the zhdanovshchina of the late 1940s was not only painful for her because of the vicious attacks on friends like Mikhail Zoshchenko, it was dangerous for her because of her association with the Serapion Brothers, whose principles were now considered heretical by the Party, and the persecution of Jews and doctors involved in the Doctors' plot of early 1953 added to her peril. Although she continued to work as a translator and journalist (her sketches were published almost exclusively in Gudok [Train Whistle]), her only book published between 1945 and 1960 was Na svoikh plechakh [On their own shoulders] (1948), a collection of short prose pieces about the heroism of young Red Cross nurses in Leningrad during the war which was favorably reviewed. In the late 1950s she was abruptly dismissed from her post as head of the Translators' Section of the Writers Union. However, by 1960 she was able to publish a collection of her poetry, and another followed in 1966 (both consisted mostly of earlier work, with a few new poems). She also began publishing selections from her memoirs, though she was never able to publish them in book form (a collection was finally published in 2008). Illness forced her to stop writing in 1967, and she died in January 1969.

== Reception ==
Although Polonskaya was highly respected in the 1920s—in 1926 the critic D. S. Mirsky called her "the most gifted of the young poetesses"—she fell into obscurity, both because of the difficulty of keeping a career going as a single mother and for political reasons. Her name began to be mentioned again with the revival of interest in the Serapion Brothers from the 1960s on, but only as a member of that group; the most attention she received until the publication of Leslie Dorfman Davis's critical study Serapion Sister in 2001 was from Wolfgang Kasack, who wrote that her poetry was "clear and beautiful," avoiding obvious emotion and sometimes sounding prosaic, "acting on the reader through its humanness and depth of thought alone."

Viktor Shklovsky wrote of her:

Like A. Veksler, Elizaveta Polonskaya wore black gloves on her hands. It was the sign of their order.
Polonskaya writes poems. Out in the world, she's a doctor, a calm and strong person. Jewish, but not an imitator. Her blood is good and thick. She writes little. She has some good poems about present-day Russia. The typesetters liked them.

== Sources ==
- Leslie Dorfman Davis, Serapion Sister: The Poetry of Elizaveta Polonskaja, Northwestern University Press, 2001, ISBN 0-8101-1579-4.

== Works ==
=== Poetry ===
- Znamenya [Signs], Petrograd: Erato, 1921.
- Pod kammenym dozhdyom [Under a stone rain], Petrograd: Polyarnaya zvezda, 1923.
- Upryamy kalendar' [A stubborn calendar], Leningrad: Izdatelstvo pisatelei, 1929.
- Goda: Izbrannye stikhi [Years: Selected verse], Leningrad: Izdatelstvo pisatelei, 1935.
- Novye stikhi, 1932-1936 [New verses, 1932-1936], Leningrad: Goslitizdat, 1937.
- Vremena muzhestva [Times of courage], Leningrad: Goslitizdat, 1940.
- Kamskaya tetrad' [A Kama notebook], Molotov: Molotovskoe oblastnoe izdatelstvo, 1945.
- Stikhotvoreniya i poema [Verses and a long poem], Leningrad: Sovetsky pisatel, 1960.
- Izbrannoe [Selected], Moscow and Leningrad: Khudozhestvennaya literatura, 1966.
- Stikhotvoreniya i poemy [Verses and long poems], St. Petersburg: Pushkin House, 2010.

=== Prose ===
- Poezdka na Ural [Voyage to the Urals], Leningrad: Priboi, 1927.
- Lyudi sovetskikh budnei [People of Soviet workdays], Leningrad: Izdatelstvo pisatelei, 1934.
- Na svoikh plechakh [On their own shoulders], Moscow and Leningrad: Lenizdat, 1948.
- Goroda i vstrechi [Cities and meetings], Moscow: Novoe literaturnoe obozrenie, 2008.
- The Envoy (посланник) posthumously 1989
