= Vsevolod Ivanov =

Soviet writer and dramatist (1895–1963)

Vsevolod Vyacheslavovich Ivanov
- Всеволод Вячеславович Иванов
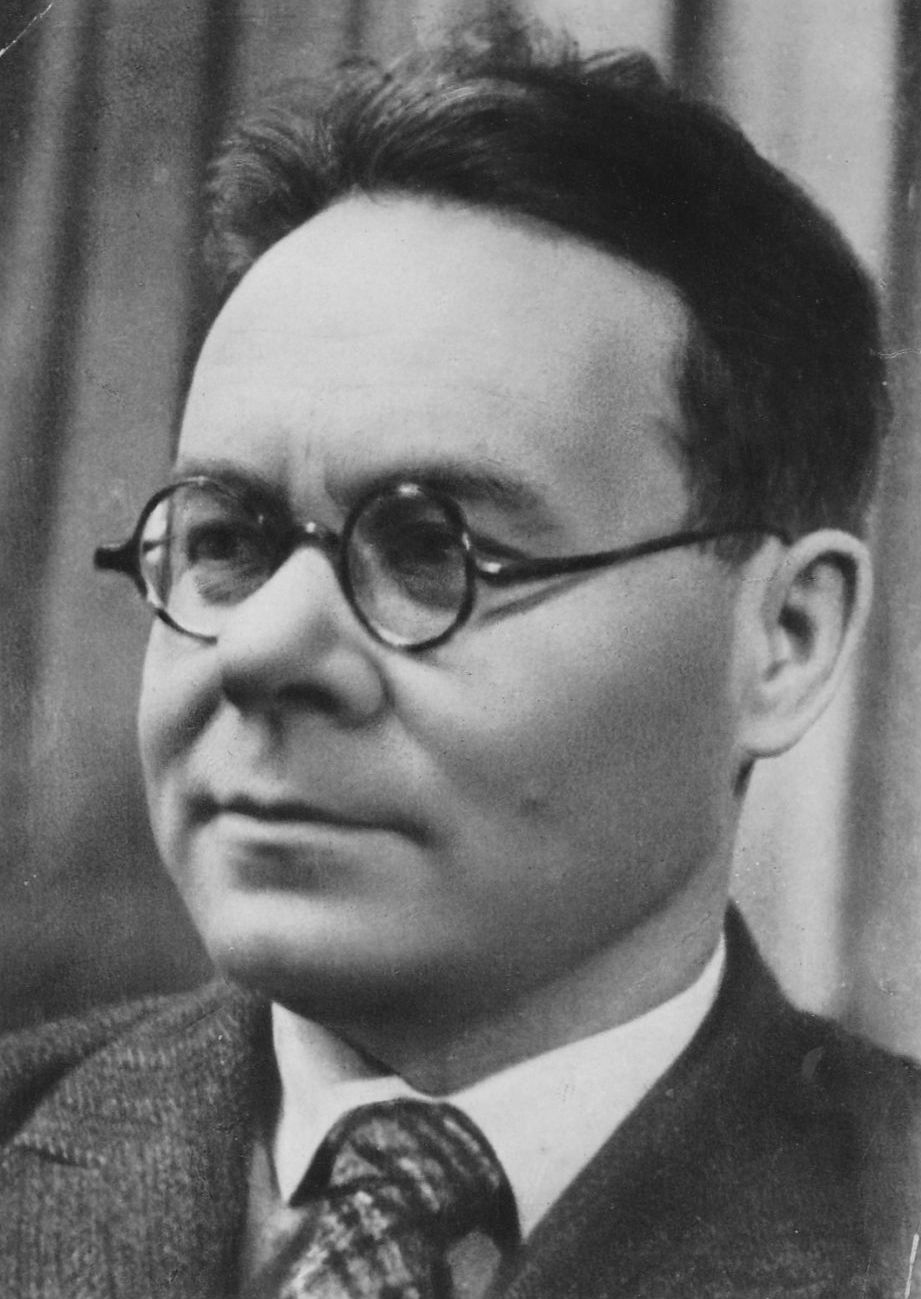
- Born: Vsevolod Vyacheslavovich Ivanov; 12 February [O.S. 31 January] 1895; Lebyazhye, Russian Empire (now Akkuly, Kazakhstan)
- Died: 15 August 1963 (aged 68); Moscow, Soviet Union
- Resting place: Novodevichy Cemetery, Moscow
- Citizenship: Russian Empire; Soviet Union
- Occupations: Writer, journalist
- Writing career
- Notable awards: Order of the Red Banner of Labour (twice); See full list

Vsevolod Vyacheslavovich Ivanov (Russian: Всеволод Вячеславович Иванов, IPA: [ˈfsʲevələt vʲɪtɕɪˈslavəvʲɪtɕ ɪˈvanəf]; 12 February [O.S. 31 January] 1895 – 15 August 1963) was a Soviet and Russian writer, dramatist, journalist and war correspondent.

== Biography ==
Ivanov was born on 12 February [O.S. 31 January] 1895 in Lebyazhye, Semipalatinsk Oblast, Governor-Generalship of the Steppes, Russian Empire, what is now Northern Kazakhstan. According to his widow's memoirs, he was born in 1892 and shortened his years in 1919 to avoid mobilization into the Russian Army. His father, Vyacheslav Alekseevich Ivanov, was a teacher.

In 1909, he was an assistant to a shopkeeper in Pavlodar. In 1910–1912 he worked in a printing house in Pavlodar, and in 1912–1913 he worked as a fakir in the circus.

His first story, published in 1915, caught the attention of Maxim Gorky, who advised Vsevolod throughout his career.

Ivanov joined the Red Army during the Civil War and fought in Siberia. This inspired his short stories "Partisans" (1921) and "Armoured Train" (1922). "Partisans" was published in the first edition of the journal Krasnaya Nov, whose editor, Aleksandr Voronsky, saw Ivanov as the most important writer to emerge since the revolution because of his "joyfulness" and his evocation of a world "where everything is suffused with powerful, primitive vitality ... people, like the nature surrounding them, are pristinely whole and healthy."

In 1922 Ivanov joined the literary group Serapion Brothers. Other members included Nikolai Tikhonov, Mikhail Zoshchenko, Viktor Shklovsky, Veniamin Kaverin and Konstantin Fedin. His first novels, Colored Winds (1922) and Azure Sands (1923), were set in the Asiatic part of Russia and gave rise to the genre of ostern in Soviet literature. In the early 1920s, he was one of the most popular writers in the Soviet Union. Thirteen of his short stories and three longer works were published in Krasnaya Nov during Voronsky's editorship – more than any other writer's. His novella Baby was acclaimed by Edmund Wilson as the finest Soviet short story ever.

In 1927 Ivanov rewrote his short story Armoured Train 14-69 into a play. Produced by the Moscow Art Theatre, it was that theatre's "first production of a strictly Soviet topic", in which the Bolsheviks' enemies were portrayed as whining caricatures, prompting speculation that the head of the MAT, Konstantin Stanislavski had put it on to please the regime and make amends for having produced The Days of the Turbins by Mikhail Bulgakov, with its vivid and sympathetic portrayal of White Russian army officers. The play was acclaimed by communist critics, and singled out for praise by Joseph Stalin, who told a writers' meeting in February 1929: "He's not a communist, Vsevolod Ivanov ... but that hasn't kept him from writing a good piece that has great revolutionary significance. Its educational significance is indisputable."

From the late 1920s, Ivanov began to drink heavily and write less, and in the opinion of at least one critic "nothing he did in the last four decades of his life matched, in quality or in influence, what he had written in those six years" (to 1927).

Later, Ivanov came under fire from Communist critics who claimed his works were too pessimistic and that it was not clear whether the Reds or Whites were the heroes.

Ivanov wrote two novels in the 1930s, Adventures of a Fakir (1935) and Parkhomenko (1938). During the Second World War, he was a war correspondent for Izvestia. During the Great Purge, he declared his "creative hatred" for those accused of being enemies of the people, provoking Leon Trotsky, who had previously praised Ivanov's work, to describe him as a "miniature Gorky" – "Not a prostitute by nature, he preferred to remain quiet as long as possible but the time came when silence meant civil and perhaps physical annihilation: it is not a 'creative hatred' that guides the pen of these writers but paralysing fear." His last novel was The Taking of Berlin (1945). In 1953, he published some reminiscences, Encounters with Maxim Gorky. His final work consisted of travel notes, published just before his death.

== Honours and awards ==
- Order of the Red Banner of Labour twice (January 31, 1939; March 1 1955)
- Medal "For Valiant Labour in the Great Patriotic War 1941–1945"
- Medal "In Commemoration of the 800th Anniversary of Moscow"

== English translations ==
- Armoured Train 14-69, International publishers, 1933.
- The Adventures of a Fakir, Vanguard Press, 1935.
- Armored Train 14-69, Trilogy Books, 1978.
- Selected Stories, Raduga Publishers, 1983.
- From the Reminiscences of Private Ivanov and Other Stories, Angel Books, 1988.
- The Child, from Great Soviet Short Stories, Dell, 1990.
- Fertility and Other Stories, Northwestern University Press, 1998. ISBN 0-8101-1547-6

== Family ==
Vsevolod's son Vyacheslav Ivanov became one of the leading philologists and Indo-Europeanists of the late 20th century. Vsevolod adopted Isaac Babel's illegitimate child Emmanuil when he married Babel's one-time mistress Tamara Kashirina. Emmanuil's name was changed to "Mikhail Ivanov" and he later became a noted artist.
