= Nikolay Oleynikov =

Russian editor, avant-garde poet and playwright

Nikolay Makarovich Oleynikov
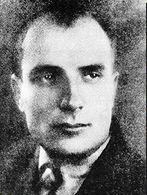
- Born: 5 August 1898; Kamenskaya, Russian Empire
- Died: 24 November 1937 (aged 39); Leningrad, Russian SFSR, Soviet Union
- Resting place: Levashovo Memorial Cemetery
- Occupations: Editor, poet and playwright
- Writing career
- Period: avant-garde

Nikolay Makarovich Oleynikov (Russian: Никола́й Мака́рович Оле́йников; 5 August 1898 – 24 November 1937) was a Russian editor, avant-garde poet and playwright who was arrested and executed by the Soviets for subversive writing. During his writing career, he also used the pen names Makar Svirepy, Nikolai Makarov, Sergey Kravtsov, NI chief engineer of the mausoleums, Kamensky and Peter Shortsighted.

== Early life ==
Nikolay Oleynikov was born in the village of Kamenskaya into a prosperous Cossack family. He graduated from Donetsk College and in 1916 entered the Kamensky Teachers' College. In December 1917 he joined the Red Guards and in March 1918 enlisted in the Red Army, fighting against the Germans and White Cossacks in the Russian Civil War. In 1920 he joined the Russian Communist Party (RKP). He worked on the editorial board of the Red Cossack newspaper, and later moved to Bakhmut where he became the executive secretary of the newspaper Russian Steamshop. With Petrograd writers Mikhail Slonimsky and Evgeny Shvarts, he organized the literary magazine Zaboi (Mine Face in English) in 1925 in Bakhmut.

== Career ==
In 1925 Oleynikov received an appointment from the Central Committee of the USSR to the Pravda newspaper in Leningrad, where he also worked as an editor on the magazine New Robinson, created by Samuel Marshak. From 1926 to 1928 he was active in Leningrad magazines, and organized broadcasts for children. In 1928 he was appointed to the Gosizdat, Children's Department of State Publishing House, as editor of the children's magazine Monthly Journal (EF). He also wrote for the children's magazine Yozh (Hedgehog in English) in 1928. From 1926 to 1937, Oleynikov was active in official duties of staging children's theater with Shostakovich and Schwartz, including Wake Lena (1934), Helen and Grapes (1935) and At Rest (1936). He also wrote humorous but satirical poems like "The Carp", "The Beetle" and "Cockroach". Early in 1937, Oleynikov became editor of Cricket, another children's magazine.

During his years in Leningrad, Oleynikov became associated with the avant-garde OBERIU writing group who published in the children's magazines, including the writers Korney Chukovsky, Boris Zhitkov, Mikhail Prishvin, Eugene Schwartz, Vitaly Bianki, Daniil Kharms, Alexander Vvedensky and Nikolai Zabolotsky. He began to privately write ironic verse and parodies which reflected mockery and criticism of the Soviet ideals, counter to his official role as a manufacturer of Party propaganda for children. Some of his early efforts are lost and the first surviving poems include "Head" (1926), followed by others including "Gluttony" (1932), "In the Art Gallery" (1936) and "Vulcan and Venus" (1937).

Only three of these poems were published in Oleynikov's lifetime. In 1934, he published "Service Science", "The Fly" and "Praise to Inventors" in the journal Thirty Days. These were immediately identified as subversive, and he dropped the idea of publishing any others. On 3 July 1937, Oleynikov was arrested as a counter-revolutionary and the editors of the Gosizdat were investigated. After several months of torture, Oleynikov was sentenced to death, was shot in on 24 November 1937 and buried at the Levashovskaya wasteland. His widow received a death certificate from the registry office that listed his death as 5 May 1942 of fever.

== Posthumous publication ==
Regardless of the light and humorous nature of his work, Oleynikov is considered one of the "darkest" and "most philosophically uncompromising" of the Russian avant-garde poets. He was "rehabilitated" by the Soviets in 1957, and after 1964, more of Oleynikov's poems were published in the USSR as part of articles that professed to ridicule his work. The first exhaustive collection of his poetry was published in 1989. In the summer of 2006, English translations of some of his poetry appeared in the US, published in OBERIU: An Anthology of Russian Absurdism.

In 1997 Ukrainian composer and director Alexey Kolomiytsev wrote a rock opera titled Vivisection based on Oleynikov's poems about animals.

== Works ==
Selected publications include:

- First Council, 1926
- Battle Days, 1927, 1991
- Tanks and sleigh, 1928
- Poetry in the journal Thirty Days, 1934
- Two poems "Cockroach," "Change name" in the almanac Poetry Day, Leningrad, 1966
- Problems of Literature, 1969, 1970
- Poetry, Bremen, 1975
- Ironic poems, New York, 1982
- Change of name, 1988
- Abyss of passions, 1990
- For a fly ..., 1990
- Poems and Poems, 2000
- Vulcan and Venus, 2004
- Circle of smart guys, 2008
