= Erast Garin =

Soviet actor

- Эраст Гарин
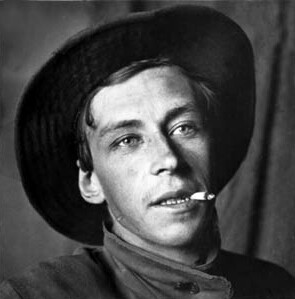
- Garin c. 1920s
- Born: Erast Pavlovich Gerasimov; November 10, 1902; Ryazan, Russian Empire
- Died: September 4, 1980 (aged 77); Moscow, Russian SFSR, Soviet Union
- Occupations: Actor; director; screenwriter
- Spouses: Khesya Lokshina (m. 1922); Lyubov Feygelman (m. 1935; div. 1941)

Erast Pavlovich Garin (Russian: Эраст Павлович Гарин; born Gerasimov [Герасимов]; 10 November [O.S. 28 October] 1902 – September 4, 1980) was a Soviet and Russian actor, director and screenwriter. He was, together with Igor Ilyinsky and Sergey Martinson, one of the leading comic actors of Vsevolod Meyerhold's company and of the Soviet cinema. He was named People's Artist of the USSR in 1977.

Garin was born in Ryazan as Erast Gerasimov. He started his acting career in 1919 in an amateur theatre of the Ryazan military district. In 1926 he finished his education in the experimental theatrical workshops of the People's Commissariat for Education. He always looked up to Meyerhold and Mikhail Chekhov as his mentors, rejecting naturalistic acting techniques propagated by Konstantin Stanislavski and paying utmost importance to voice and gesture.

Garin worked with Meyerhold in his theatre until its dissolution in 1936. Among his triumphs was the part of Khlestakov in the 1926 production of The Government Inspector. The trance-like quality of his "grotesquely anxious" performances in Meyerhold's productions could be attributed to an expressionistic acting style.

Nikolay Akimov's Theatre of Comedy was the next theatre he worked in. In 1946, he gave up stage performances and concentrated on film acting. In 1941, he was awarded the Stalin Prize for the role of Tarakanov in the film Musical Story. Half-blindness prevented him from playing any major roles in the 1960s and 1970s.

Together with his wife Khesya Lokshina, he was director of several films, to which he also contributed scripts. They adapted Mikhail Zoshchenko's novel Respected Comrade in 1930. Garin's memoirs, entitled With Meyerhold, appeared in 1974.

== Filmography ==
=== As actor ===
- Lieutenant Kijé (Поручик Киже, 1934) - Adjutant
- Marriage (Женитьба, 1936) - Podkolesin
- Bezhin Meadow (Бежин луг, 1937)
- On the Frontier (На границе, 1938) - Volkov - Saboteur
- Musical Story (Музыкальная история, 1940) - Cabbie Tarahkanov
- Combat Film Collection No. 7 (1941) - German soldier (segment "Eleksir bodrosti")
- Shveik Readies for Battle (Швейк готовится к бою, 1942) - Francua
- The Wedding (Свадьба, 1944) - Epaminond Maksimovich Aplombov - the fiance
- Ivan Nikulin: Russian Sailor (Иван Никулин — русский матрос, 1945) - Tikhon Spiridonovich
- Blue Mountain Land (Синегория, 1946)
- Cinderella (Золушка, 1947) - King
- Encounter at the Elbe (Встреча на Эльбе, 1949) - Tommy, a captain
- The Inspector-General (Ревизор, 1952) - Postmaster Ivan Kuzmich Shpekin
- Jambyl (1953)
- Nesterka (1955) - Skolyar Samokhvalskiy
- Unfinished Story (Неоконченная повесть, 1955) - Koloskov
- The Enchanted Boy (Заколдованный мальчик (озвучивание), 1955, Short) - Martin (voice)
- The Twelve Months (1956) - The Professor (voice, uncredited)
- The Girl Without an Address (Девушка без адреса, 1958) - Grandfather
- Soldiers Were Going... (Шли солдаты, 1958)
- The Witch (Ведьма, 1958)
- The Secret of the Faraway Island, (Тайна далёкого острова, 1958) - Professor
- Beloved Beauty (Краса ненаглядная, 1959) - Tsar (voice)
- The Adventures of Buratino (1959) - Toad Feldsher (uncredited)
- Russian Souvenir (Русский сувенир, 1960) - John Peebles, American philosopher
- Aquatic (Водяной, 1961)
- Alyonka (Аленка, 1962) - Konstantin Venyaminovich
- The Wild Swans (Дикие лебеди, 1962) - The Bishop (voice)
- An Extraordinary City (1963)
- Optimistic Tragedy (Оптимистическая трагедия, 1963) - Vozhachok
- Kain XVIII (Каин XVIII, 1963) - King Kain XVIII
- A Little Frog Is looking for His Father (Лягушонок ищет папу (озвучивание), 1965, Short) - (voice)
- An Ordinary Miracle (Обыкновенное чудо, 1965) - King
- Rasplyuev's Days of Fun (Весёлые расплюевские дни, 1966) - Kandid Tarelkin
- Two Days of Miracles (Два дня чудес, 1970)
- The Twelve Chairs (1971)
- Gentlemen of Fortune (Джентльмены удачи, 1971) - Nikolai Grigorevich Maltsev, archeologist
- If You are a Man... (Если ты мужчина..., 1971) - Ulyanych
- Winnie-the-Pooh and a Busy Day (Винни-Пух и день забот (озвучивание), 1972, Short) - Eeyore (voice)
- Much Ado About Nothing (Много шума из ничего, 1973) - Verges
- Nylon 100% (Нейлон 100%, 1973) - Tamer
- Trading a Dog for a Steam Locomotive (Меняю собаку на паровоз, 1975)
- Olden Times of Poshekhon (1975 film) (Пошехонская старина, 1975)

=== As director ===
- Marriage (Женитьба, 1936), based on the eponymous play by Nikolay Gogol.
- Doctor Kalyuzhnyy (Доктор Калюжный, 1939)
- Prince and the Pauper (Принц и нищий, 1942)
- Blue Mountain Land (Синегория, 1946)
- An Ordinary Miracle (Обыкновенное чудо, 1964), on the eponymous play by Evgeny Schwartz.
- Rasplyuev's Days of Fun (Весёлые расплюевские дни, 1966), based on Alexander Sukhovo-Kobylin's play Tarelkin's Death.

=== As script writer ===
- Marriage (Женитьба, 1936)
- An Ordinary Miracle (Обыкновенное чудо, 1964)
- Rasplyuev's Days of Fun (Весёлые расплюевские дни, 1966)
