= An Ordinary Miracle =

An Ordinary Miracle may refer to:

- An Ordinary Miracle, a play by Evgeny Schwartz
- An Ordinary Miracle (1964 film), a Soviet 1964 film based on the play by Evgeny Schwartz
- An Ordinary Miracle (1978 film), a Soviet 1978 musical film based on the play by Evgeny Schwartz
- "Ordinary Miracle", a song by Dave Stewart and Glen Ballard, performed by Sarah McLachlan, from the 2006 film Charlotte's Web
