= Lev Lunts =

Russian writer (1901–1924)

- Lev Lunts, Petrograd, 1921-1922.
- Born: May 2, 1901. Saint Petersburg, Russia.
- Died: May 10, 1924 (aged 23). Hamburg, Germany
- Occupation: Short story writer, playwright
- Literary movement: Serapion Brothers

Lev Natanovich Lunts (Russian: Лев Ната́нович Лунц; May 2, 1901 – May 10, 1924) was a Russian playwright, proser and critic. He was a founding member of the Serapion Brothers (1921–1929), a group of young writers who emerged from the literary studio at the House of Arts in Petrograd. Highly active in the years 1919-1924, he completed five plays, two screenplays for the silent film, eight articles on the theater, one novella, a dozen stories and a dozen essays, in addition to learning languages, completing his undergraduate courses and participating in the lively activities of the Serapions. The harsh conditions of the time and his hectic literary activity thoroughly exhausted him and ruined his health, and he sought medical care abroad in June 1923. After several months in a sanatorium in southern Germany, he died of heart failure and a brain embolism in the city hospital of Hamburg, a week after his twenty-third birthday. After his death, his works were censored in Russia for the full extent of the Soviet period (1921-1991), but he was remembered for his daring defense of creative freedom against Bolshevik Party demands for political commitment. Finally in 2003 and 2007, well after the collapse of the Soviet Union, his complete works were published in Russia. A three-volume edition of his collected works appeared in English translation in 2014-2016.

== Biography ==
Lunts was born in Saint Petersburg, the capital of the Russian Empire, into a middle-class Jewish family on May 2, 1901. His father, Natan Yakovlevich, an emigrant from Lithuania, was a pharmacist and seller of scientific instruments. His mother, Anna Efimovna, was an accomplished pianist. As a child, Lev was delicate but very lively; he contracted pneumonia and diphtheria, which may have weakened his heart. At a very early age he began to write humorous stories for the amusement of friends and family; in his teens, he was attracted to Western adventure novels and classical plays, especially of Italian and Spanish literature. Orlando Furioso by Ludovico Ariosto he considered a great discovery of his youth. He took his school work very seriously, and in the summer of 1918 graduated from the Petrograd First Gimnaziya with a gold medal. In September of the year he enrolled in the Philological Faculty (Romance-Germanic Department) of Petrograd University. Here he studied Italian, Spanish, German, French, Latin and the histories and literatures of these languages. His term papers were so outstanding that he was considered "a future light of science," as Kornei Chukovsky recalled in his memoirs. Completing his courses in the spring of 1922, Lunts was retained for graduate school and began reading the novels of Balzac. His worsening health at the end of that year, however, compelled him to seek care in Germany, to which his parents had emigrated early in 1921. With a commission from the university to study Italian and Spanish in Europe, and recommendations from influential writers, he was permitted to leave Russia, and took a steamship to Hamburg on June 1, 1923.

== Theater ==
Lunts was an experimental writer who tried a great variety of forms. His theatrical compositions present his most impressive body of work. He wrote five plays, two screenplays, a half-dozen articles on the theater and a couple of play reviews.

As a fervent Westernizer among the Serapion Brothers, Lunts advocated that they learn from the adventure literature of Robert Louis Stevenson and Alexandre Dumas père, and by way of example wrote two romantic plays filled with intrigue and action. Outside the Law (1920), set in an abstract, conventional Spain, presents a Robin Hood bandit who is declared by the authorities to be outside the law. He wittily turns this declaration into a formula for freedom, unpredictable action and revolution with himself as the leader of the masses. The hero of Bertrand de Born (1922) is a historical figure of the 12th century, a seditious troubadour at the court of King Henry II in Argentan, France. Lunts appended an afterword to the play presenting his credo of a new romantic tragedy for revolutionary times. The Apes Are Coming! (1920-1923), written under the influence of radical directors like Vsevolod Meyerhold and Sergei Radlov, is a wild burlesque of the Bolshevik revolution with a tumultuous conclusion that tears down the set. The last play, The City of Truth (1923), is a parable of the revolution in which homesick soldiers stumble into a calm and reasonable utopia, and get bored with the peace. His first play, The Son of the Sheik (1919), of which only fragments survive, concerns an ageing sheik who fears for the survival of his newborn son and heir. He therefore decides to keep him away from all women, including his mother, and even to prevent him from learning of the existence of a second sex. This situation provides the setup for a series of theatrical pieces (the expulsion of a loving wife, the worries of a doting father, the discovery of feminine charm by an innocent boy), which are treated in a stylized and humorous fashion. The manuscript states that the theme was taken from an Arabic legend.

All four of the complete plays, despite their heterogeneity, explore the conflict between the individual's rage for freedom and society's need for order. Read separately, they evoke the excitement of the avant-garde theater in early post-revolutionary Russia, but taken together develop a philosophical theme to a surprising depth for a writer so young.

Their theme of anarchic freedom vs. imposed social control carries over into Lunts's spectacular screenplay, Vostanie veshchei [Things In Revolt], a silent-film scenario discovered forty years after his death. Its basic idea is a revolt of inanimate objects to establish law and order over lawless and inconsistent mankind. Written in less than three weeks during the summer of 1923, while Lunts was gravely ill, it depicts a whole city of things moving by themselves and attacking people, both on the street and in their apartments. Decades had to pass before such a conception could be realized, and then only with CGI ─ computer generated images.

His other screenplay, Zaveshchanie tsarya [The Tsar's Treasure], is closer to the typical silent films of the time, with a young Bolshevik hero trying to get a treasure map for the Reds and prevent the Whites from getting it to finance their counterrevolution. There are chases, motorcycle races, shootings. It is based on his single novella of the same name.

== Prose ==
The prose of Lev Lunts consists of literary articles, polemical articles, book reviews, stories and the one novella.

Although an atheist, Lunts was steeped in Jewish culture and dedicated to it. He expressed his Jewish concerns most openly in a letter sent to Maxim Gorky dated August 16, 1922:

“Was I right in setting out into literature? Not that I do not believe in my powers: I believe in myself, perhaps too boldly. But I am a Jew. Convinced, steadfast, and glad of it. But I am a Russian writer. And then I am a Russian Jew. Russia is my native land, I love Russia above all countries. How can one reconcile these things? For myself I have reconciled everything, for me all this is plain and clear, but others think differently. Others say: ‘A Jew cannot be a Russian writer...’”

Lunts's concerns with his Jewish heritage are revealed in three stories written in a Biblical style that draw on separate episodes from the Hebrew Bible (the Old Testament), but give them a modern and even post-revolutionary slant. They are: “In the Wilderness” (March 1921), “The Castrate” (Dec. 1921) and “The Homeland” (July 1922). Each creates its own intonation and system of refrains, and each uses Biblical material or classical sources, such as Herodotus, for its own purposes. A different purpose can be seen in each story, and a different approach to the short-story genre.

The first describes the Jews of Exodus dragging through the desert, starving and groaning under the whips of Aaron and the Levites, then rebelling. The second is most mysterious, as it concerns a castrate with childish laughter who wins the maternal heart of a man's barren wife, is adopted by her, and thus overcomes adversity. The story has parallels with the Book of Ruth and also with his own essay, "Detskii smekh" (Children's Laughter), which glorifies that laughter as pure innocence. The third story is autobiographical science-fiction, involving a time warp inside a synagogue and the transmigration of Lunts and his friend Veniamin Kaverin to ancient Babylon, where their alienation as Jews in Petrograd becomes more manifest. One or another of these stories has been anthologized in collections of Jewish literature. The first one, "In the Wilderness," can be read in English online.

The other stories pose a sharp contrast to the Biblical, being sketches and satires of the new Soviet society. “Outgoing No. 37” takes aim at the petty bureaucrat uplifted by revolutionary ideals. The long epistolary story, “Crossing the Border,” mixes Jewish subjects with Soviet reality, with the result that the actions of nearly all of the characters are completely illogical. Lunts places himself in the story as a trickster who gets everyone into trouble. The story “The Man in a Coat” emphasizes this irrational and even demonic element, drawing on Gogol's classic stories “Nevsky Prospekt” and “The Overcoat.” A bathroom story called “A Patriot” draws on the tradition of showing Russians befuddled by Western inventiveness, in this case a pay toilet in the Berlin train station. Lunts also wrote a couple of skaz pieces, little stories illustrating the street argot of ordinary people, in this case a fickle woman with pretensions to culture (French expressions). They appear to draw inspiration from stories of seduction by Maupassant.

His longest work of prose is Zaveshchanie tsarya [The Tsar's Treasure], a novella in twenty-two chapters dating from late 1922 to early 1923. Previously unpublished, it was rescued from the archive and printed for the first time in Moscow in 2007. The screenplay based on the novella is all action and emotion in the manner of early silent films, but the novella, while moving swiftly, is complex, psychological and challenging. Within a strongly developed plot and a standard battle of Reds vs. Whites, it presents scenes of early Soviet society unlike any in the Socialist Realism literature that followed. The themes of rape and revenge, sadism, masochism, Bolshevik naivete, homosexuality, Jewish upbringing, poverty and filth in the capital are combined with a sincere attempt to portray the experience of young people growing up in the Revolution and Civil War. The result is awkward and unsettling, but strikingly realistic.

In 2009, a collection of stories by the Serapion Brothers that had been filed in 1921 and lost in a Finnish archive was rediscovered. Funding was obtained, and in 2013 the whole collection was published in Russian under the title Serapionovy brat'ya: Al'manakh 1921 [The Serapion Brothers: Almanac 1921] (St. Petersburg: Limbus Press, 2013). Some of the stories had been published elsewhere in their time, but the story by Lunts, entitled Bunt [The Rebellion] and dated May 1921, was entirely "new." Its content was unexpected. Like the novella, it is both realistic and psychological, but it is also militaristic. It describes a town taken over by the Bolsheviks whose residents launch a frontal attack on the Party headquarters, boxing in the hero and his son. This story and the novella show that Lunts could write battle scenes and draw military characters as well as fellow Serapions who had been in uniform and fought in World War I or in the Russian Civil War. (Lunts was exempted by his weak heart.) The frequent characterization of Lunts as young and bookish that occurs in the literature is based on only one side of his diverse output.

== Articles and essays ==
One of Lunts's university papers was also published for the first time in 2007, a lengthy analysis of the French revolutionary poet Henri Auguste Barbier (1805-1882), a stirring poet who lived long past his time. Another insightful analysis is the paper on Pierre de Marivaux (1688-1763), whose "game of love" plots worked so well in plays, but were deadly boring in novels. Lunts published this essay, "Marivaudage," in 1919. His book review of a translation into Russian of Dante's treatise De vulgari eloquio, published in 1922, also gives evidence of his university studies. There are other reviews and articles among his works that are expert and varied, including assessments of poets, but Lunts did not live to write a book-length study or collection of essays.

During the Cold War Lunts was known to professors and students of Russian literature abroad as the author of daring polemical articles that aroused the most powerful Bolshevik critics against him. The chief articles are “Why We Are the Serapion Brothers,” “On Ideology and Promotional Literature” and “Go West!,” all from 1922. Their message was simple: ideological regimentation produces bad literature, writers must have the freedom to write what they want, such writing is more alive and exciting to readers than what is dictated from above. The Serapion Brothers, said Lunts, accepted all literature that was written well, regardless of its ideology, and debated the merits of each work from their individual perspectives. Toward the end of the first article, which was often taken as the manifesto of the group, Lunts declared:

"Too long and painfully has social commitment ruled Russian literature. It is time to say that a non-Communist story may lack talent, but also may possess genius. And we do not care with whom stood Blok, the poet, author of “The Twelve,” or Bunin, the prosaist, author of “The Gentleman from San Francisco.”

"These are ABC truths, but every day convinces us that they must be repeated again and again.

"With whom, then, are we, Serapion Brothers?

"We are with the hermit Serapion. We believe that literary chimeras have a special reality. We do not want utilitarianism. We do not write for propaganda. Art is real, like life itself. And, like life itself, it is without goal and without meaning: it exists because it cannot help but exist."

The second article answered critics of the first and raised the question whether readers in the Soviet Union would be permitted to read writers with bad ideology, such as Kipling and Shakespeare. The third article, "Go West!" (Dec. 1922), was a long speech delivered to the Serapions. Here Lunts argued that too many Russian writers were lazy and self-satisfied; they were barbarians who needed to study plot and structure from Western masters. Again, he asserted that plot, action and good composition would win the approval of proletarian readers and theatergoers sooner than would a proper political message. He provided a survey of Russian literature from the point of view of the development of plot.

Party critics, including the head of the censorship board, debated with Lunts in print. The Commissar of Education banned his plays. The Party closed down the House of Arts and turned it into an apartment complex, in large part because of the free spirit of the Serapion Brothers, who held their meetings there. Lunts did not recant, but died young, so that his arguments remained inviolate for the extent of the Soviet period. The American scholar Victor Erlich characterized these arguments as “the most forthright plea for creative freedom to be found in the annals of Soviet literature."

After his death, Lunts's works were suppressed, but strangely also publicized. In 1946, to stifle the people's expectation of increased freedom after World War II, and to kill a lingering nostalgia for the colorful literary life and unrestricted debates of the early Soviet period, the Party seized on the Serapion Brothers and its so-called “manifesto.” All the writers but Lunts were still alive, but no longer working together as a literary group. Some were prominent members of the Union of Soviet Writers and enjoyed wide readerships. Party spokesman Andrei Zhdanov (1896-1948), formally addressing the Soviet writers in Leningrad, quoted Lunts (as above) and declared: “This is the preaching of rotten apoliticism, philistinism and vulgarity.” He proceeded to attack the most popular writer among the former Serapions, Mikhail Zoshchenko (1894-1958), characterizing him as a decadent anti-Soviet malcontent and instantly destroying his career. Thus he served notice that the party was resuming its prewar policies and would not tolerate free-thinking writers.

Zhdanov's speech entered the curriculum of the literature departments in all the Soviet universities and remained there to be read year after year up to the abolition of the Soviet program of education. Thus, inadvertently, the Party kept alive a portion of Lunts's words and thought, and suggested a freedom that had been lost. Russian scholar Mariya Chudakova observed: “Lunts was not read (there was nowhere to read him), but he was always recalled whenever the subject turned to the 1920s ─ in articles, monographs, lectures, presentations and private judgements of other people’s works on the literary history of that time.”

Former Serapions Konstantin Fedin (1892-1977), Mikhail Slonimsky (1897-1972) and Veniamin Kaverin (1902-1989), in particular, when writing their memoirs in the 1960s, unfailingly recalled the Serapion Brothers and Lunts. A commission was formed in 1967, headed by the journalist Solomon Podolsky (1900-1974), to collect all of Lunts's works, together with the literature about him, and to publish a commemorative volume, thus finally to realize the plan of the "brothers" that was snuffed out in the Stalin-Zhdanov years. But repeatedly the plan ran into opposition from the conservative literary establishment. Kaverin managed to republish Lunts's last play, Gorod Pravdy [The City of Truth], in a theatrical journal in 1989, one year after he had helped to effect the first publication in the Soviet Union of Yevgeny Zamyatin's anti-utopian novel, My [We, 1920]. The censorship board was beginning to crack, but still the Lunts collection was delayed beyond the life of the last Serapion (Kaverin) and the end of the Soviet system.

== Russian editions ==
The four complete plays, together with six stories and three polemical essays, published individually in Russia during the 1920s, were republished by Michael Wainstein (M. Veinshtein) in Israel as Лев Лунц, Родина и другие произведения [The Homeland and Other Works] (Jerusalem: Seriiya: 1981), 356 pages.

Some of the lesser-known works were published by Wolfgang Schriek in Germany as Lev Lunts, Zaveshchanie tsarya: Neopublikovannyi kinostsenarii, rasskazy, stat’i, retsenzii, pis’ma, nekrologi [The Tsar's Testament: An Unpublished Film Script, Stories, Articles, Reviews, Letters, Obituaries] (München: Verlag Otto Sagner, 1983), 214 pages.

Wainstein's collection was republished in Russia by Sergei Slonimsky under the title Лев Лунц, Вне закона: Пьесы, рассказы, статьи [Outside the Law: Plays, Stories, Articles] (St. Petersburg: Kompozitor, 1994).

All the plays, stories and articles (except the incomplete ones) were published in a one-volume collected works as Лев Лунц, Обезьяны идут!: Проза, драматургия, публицистика, переписка [The Apes Are Coming!: Prose, Drama, Journalism, Correspondence] (St. Petersburg: Inapress, 2003), 750 pages. Edited by Yevgeny Lemming.

All the plays, stories and articles (including the incomplete ones), plus the novella, were published in a one-volume complete works as Л. Н. Лунц, Литературное наследие [Literary Legacy] (Moscow: Nauchyni mir, 2007), 710 pages. This exhaustive work, partially assembled by Solomon Podol'sky before his death, was completed by Alla Yevstigneyeva.

== English translations ==
Lev Luntz, “Beyond the Law,” translated by Fania Hural, American Labour Monthly, Feb., March, July, Aug., Sept., 1924.

Leo Lunz, The Outlaw, trans. by F. O’Dempsey, manuscript, New York Public Library, 1929.

Leo N. Lunz, The City of Truth, trans. by John Silver (London: Fitzpatrick O’Dempsey, 1929). A Cockney version.

"Native Land" (story), An Anthology of Jewish-Russian Literature: 1801–1953, M.E. Sharpe, 2007.

Lev Luntz, “The Monkeys Are Coming!,” The Monkeys Are Coming: Russian Drama of the 1920s, trans. by Michael Green, Jerome Katsell & Stanislav Shvabrin (Idyllwild, CA: Charles Schlacks, 2009), 13-36.

The above translation was used for the student production of The Monkeys Are Coming! directed by Gabriel Crouse, presented by the Program in Theater of the Lewis Center for the Arts at Princeton University, September 30-October 1 & Oct. 6-8, 2011. A DVD (digital versatile disk) recording was made of the production; the trailer can be seen online:

http://www.princeton.edu/main/news/archive/S31/70/52I92/

Lev Lunts, Collected Works In Three Volumes:

Volume I. Things In Revolt: The Theater of Lev Lunts. Translated & edited, with an introduction, “Spared from Compromises,” by Gary Kern. Preface by Veniamin Kaverin. (Las Cruces: Xenos Books, 2014) ISBN 978-1-879378-81-0, xviii, 289 pages.

Volume II. In the Wilderness: The Prose of Lev Lunts Translated & edited, with an introduction, “Forever Young,” by Gary Kern. (Las Cruces: Xenos Books, 2014) ISBN 978-1-879378-82-7, xii, 279 pages.

Volume III. Journey On A Hospital Bed: Lev Lunts & The Serapion Brothers: Articles, Correspondence & Memoirs. Translated & edited, with an introduction, “Voices from the Past,” by Gary Kern. (Las Cruces: Xenos Books, 2016) ISBN 978-1-879378-83-4, xiv, 325 pages.

"In the Wilderness" (story) posted online : http://home.earthlink.net/~gwkern/Lunts.htm

== Other translations ==
Leo Lunz, “Vogelfrei,” trans. by Dmitrij Umanskij, Der Querschnitt, Cologne, No. 1, vol. 5, 1925.

Leo Lunz, Die Stadt der Gleichheit, tr. by Erich Boehme, manuscript, Lev Lunts Papers, Beinecke Rare Book and Manuscript Library, Yale University, probably 1924-1929. See below for information on the archive.

Lev N. Lunz, La città della verità, tr. by Ettore Lo Gatto (Roma: Anonima romana editoriale), 1930.

Lev Lunc, La rivolta delle cose: Teatro, racconti, saggi, testimonianze, trans. by Maria Olsoufieva (Bari: De Donato, 1968), 462 pages. Includes the four completed plays and the major screenplay, plus most of the articles and stories.

Léon Luntz, Israel, tr. by Jarl Priel, Al Liamm, No. 65, 1957

== Archive ==
The original manuscripts of Lunts's two screenplays, his hospital memoir, rough drafts of letters he sent and the original letters he received in Germany, 1923-1924, plus his last effects (passport, wallet, photographs), were kept by his parents and later by his sister, Yevgeniya ("Zhenya") Lunts, who put everything in a brown suitcase. She married, moved to England and became Genia Hornstein (1908-1971). She kept the suitcase unopened through the war years. Early in 1964 she opened it and shared unpublished materials with a visiting graduate student from Manchester University, Gary Kern, who sorted them into folders and used them in his dissertation on Lunts and the Serapion Brothers. In 1965, through the agency of Nina Berberova (1901-1993), she donated the collection to Yale University.

The Lev Lunts Papers Beinecke Rare Book and Manuscript Library P.O. Box 208330 New Haven, CT 06520-8330 Call Number: GEN MSS 104

http://drs.library.yale.edu/HLTransformer/HLTransServlet?stylename=yul.ead2002.xhtml.xsl&pid=beinecke:lunts&clear-stylesheet-cache=yes
