= Nikolay Zabolotsky =

Soviet and Russian poet and translator

- Born: Nikolay Alekseyevich Zabolotsky; May 7, 1903; Kazan, Kazan Governorate, Russian Empire
- Died: October 14, 1958 (aged 55); Moscow, RSFSR, Soviet Union
- Occupations: Poet, translator
- Writing career
- Notable awards: Shota Rustaveli Prize

Nikolay Alekseyevich Zabolotsky (Russian: Никола́й Алексе́евич Заболо́цкий; May 7, 1903 – October 14, 1958) was a prominent Soviet and Russian poet and translator. He was a member of the Union of Soviet Writers.

He was repressed in 1938, imprisoned from 1939 to 1943, and posthumously rehabilitated in 1963.

== Life and work ==
=== Early life ===
Nikolay Alekseyevich Zabolotsky was born on May 7, 1903, in Kizicheskaya sloboda (now part of the city of Kazan). His father, Alexei Agafonovich Zabolotsky (1864–1929) was an agronomist, who managed a zemstvo agricultural farm. His mother, Lydia Andreevna (née Dyakonova) Zabolotsky (1882?-1926) was a teacher. His early life was spent in the towns of Sernur (now in the Republic of Mari El) and Urzhum (now in the Kirov Oblast). In 1920, Zabolotsky left his family and moved to Moscow, enrolling simultaneously in the departments of medicine and philology at the Moscow State University. A year later, he moved to Petrograd (now Saint Petersburg) and enrolled in the Pedagogical Institute of Leningrad State Pedagogical Institute.

=== Work ===
Zabolotsky had already begun to write poetry at this time. His formative period showed the influences of the Futurist works of Vladimir Mayakovsky and Velimir Khlebnikov, the lyrical poems of Alexander Blok and Sergei Yesenin, and the art of Pavel Filonov and Marc Chagall. During this period, Zabolotsky also met his future wife, E.V. Klykova.

In 1928, Zabolotsky founded the avant-garde group Oberiu with Daniil Kharms and Alexander Vvedensky. The group's acronym stood for "The Association of Real Art" (in Russian, Объединение реального искусства). During this period, Zabolotsky began to be published. His first book of poetry, Columns (Столбцы, 1929), was a series of grotesque vignettes on the life that Vladimir Lenin's New Economic Policy (NEP) had created. It included the poem "The Signs of the Zodiac Fade" (Меркнут знаки зодиака), an absurdist lullaby that, 67 years later, in 1996, provided the words for a Russian pop hit. In 1937, Zabolotsky published his second book of poetry. This collection showed the subject matter of Zabolotsky's work moving from social concerns to elegies and nature poetry. This book is notable for its inclusion of pantheistic themes.

Zabolotsky's poetry also included works focused on religious themes. These are rooted on his early religious training and expressed Orthodoxy of the peasantry before the revolution. While official biographical statements depicted him as a politically and sanitized Soviet poet, officially and unofficially published works showed that he had more spiritual and intellectual depth. By the 1930s, Zabolotsky modified his poetic style towards "socialist realism" in a move to produce acceptable ideological content.

Amidst Joseph Stalin's increased censorship of the arts, Zabolotsky fell victim to the Great Purge. Arrested in 1938, he was tortured, and accused of taking part of a counter-revolutionary plot with other Leningrad (St Petersburg) writers, including Nikolai Tikhonov, Konstantin Fedin, and Samuil Marshak - none of whom were arrested. He was sentenced to five years to Siberia. This sentence was prolonged until the war was over. In 1944 after his appeal he was freed of guard, but still continued the sentence in exile in Karaganda. In Siberia he continued his creative work and was occupied with translation of The Tale of Igor's Campaign. This followed with his release in 1945.

Upon his return to Moscow in 1946, Zabolotsky was restored as member of Union of Soviet Writers. He also translated several Georgian poets (including Shota Rustaveli's epic poem The Knight in the Panther's Skin, as well as more modern Georgian poets such as Vazha-Pshavela, Grigol Orbeliani, Davit Guramishvili) and traveled frequently to Georgia. Zabolotsky also resumed his work as an original poet. However, the literature of his post-exile years experienced drastic stylistic changes. His poetry began to take a more traditional, conservative form and was often compared to the work of Tyutchev.

=== Family ===
In 1930 he married Ekaterina Vasilyevna Klykova (1906–1997). They had two children:

- Nikita Nikolaevich Zabolotsky (1932–2014), a candidate of biological sciences and author of biographical and memorial works about his father.
- Natalia Nikolaevna Zabolotskaya (b. 1937). In 1962 she married Nikolai Veniaminovich Kaverin, a virgologist and son of the writer Veniamin Kaverin.

His cousin was the children's writer Leonid Vladimirovich Dyakonov (1908–1995).

So what if hers is not a lovely face?
She won’t excel in the enchantment lessons,
But she is blessed with innocence and grace,
Soft radiance imbues her very essence.
So what is beauty? And why does the human race
Keep up its worship, whether valid or misguided?
Is it a vessel holding empty space,
Or is it fire shimmering inside it?

— Nikolay Zabolotsky, from A Plain Girl (1955), translated by Alyona Mokraya

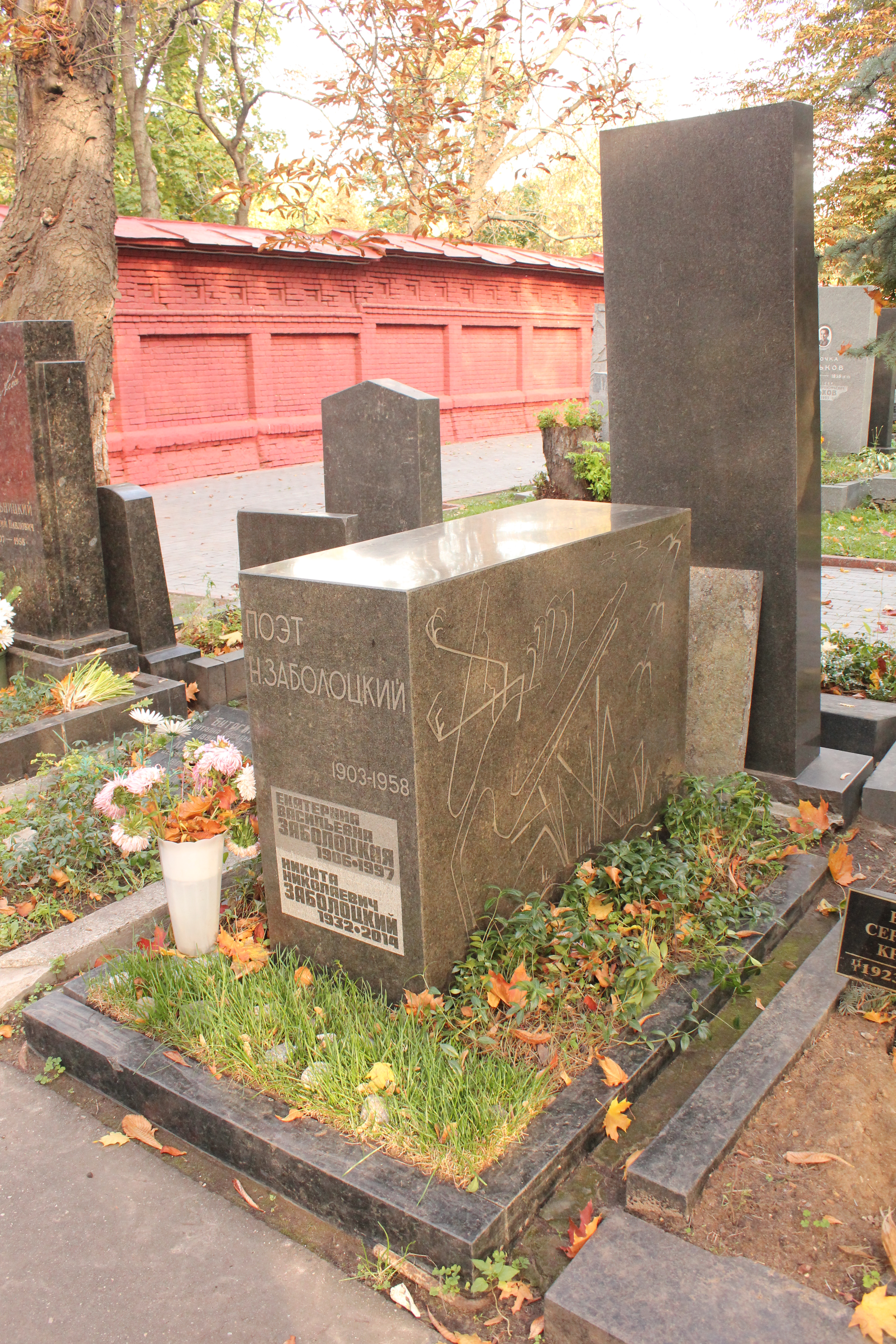
The grave of Nikolai Alexeyevich Zabolotsky.

=== Later life and death ===
The last few years of Zabolotsky's life were beset by illness. He suffered a debilitating heart attack and, from 1956 onward, spent much of his time in the town of Tarusa. A second heart attack claimed his life on October 14, 1958, in Moscow. He was buried at Novodevichy Cemetery.
