= Zoshchenko =

Zoshchenko, Russian: Зо́щенко is a Russian and Ukrainian surname. Notable people with the surname include:

- Mikhail Zoshchenko (1894–1958), Soviet author and satirist
  - 5759 Zoshchenko, named after Mikhail
