= Marriage (play) =

Two-act play by Nikolai Gogol

Cover page of the first edition

Marriage (Russian: «Женитьба», Zhenit'ba) is a two-act play by the Russian writer Nikolai Gogol, which was written in 1832 and first published in 1842.

== Plot summary ==
In the opening scene, a civil servant named Ivan Kuzmich Podkolyosin sits alone in his room smoking a pipe and contemplating marriage. He has hired a matchmaker (Fyokla Ivanovna), as was the custom in Russia at the time, to help find him a bride. As the two converse, the audience discovers that Podkolyosin has been in search of a bride for quite some time. The reason for his not being yet married, however, is his own indecisiveness rather than the lack of a suitable partner. In fact, Fyokla has found him a nice young woman named Agafya Tikhonovna.

When Podkolyosin's friend Kochkaryov unexpectedly pays a visit and finds Fyokla at Podkolyosin's home, he learns for the first time of his friend's search for a bride. The fact that Podkolyosin has not mentioned it to his friend provides further proof of his indecision. Kochkaryov becomes outraged at Fyokla because she also arranged his marriage, and he and his wife are unhappy in it. Kochkaryov, after cleverly getting Fyokla to reveal the location of Agafya's home, informs Fyokla that her services are no longer needed and that he will proceed with the matter on his own.

In the next scene, Agafya and her aunt, Arina, are discussing the issue of marriage when the matchmaker walks in on them. She informs the two women that several suitors will soon be making appearances at the home. Presumably, Fyokla has just made the rounds of the town in hopes of beating out Kochkaryov and Podkolyosin, as she will not receive any money if the marriage should occur without her help.

Besides Kochkaryov and Podkolyosin, three suitors arrive. The first is Yaichnitsa (whose name means 'fried eggs' or 'omelet'). Yaichnitsa is overly concerned with the dowry and appears skeptical as to whether Fyokla has told him the truth about it. The second suitor, Anuchkin, is a man of refinement and wants a bride who speaks French, which is fashionable among the upper classes, even though he doesn't speak the language himself. The third, Zhevakin, a retired navy lieutenant, recounts a detailed story about the time his squadron spent in Sicily, where, amazingly enough, no one speaks Russian. He is often mesmerized by female beauty. At this point, Podkolyosin and Kochkaryov arrive and everyone sits down to chat. Yaichnitsa almost immediately demands that Agafya make a decision, which makes her so uncomfortable that she leaves the room.

All of the suitors wonder what happened. Once they are alone Kochkaryov tries to scare off the other suitors by saying that Agafya is ugly and can't speak French and that her dowry is worthless. Kochkaryov later pays Agafya a visit in her room and convinces her to choose Podkolyosin over the others (she herself was indecisive about who she liked best). The other suitors all come back and Agafya and Kochkaryov together tell them off until only Podkolyosin remains. After a great deal of pushing on the part of Kochkaryov, the two become engaged. Actually, Kochkaryov had to propose because Podkolyosin was still indecisive and wanted to wait another month before proposing.

Kochkaryov insists that the wedding must take place immediately as he has already ordered all of the food and the guests are waiting at the church. The bride and groom begin to get dressed and Podkolyosin muses to himself about the splendor of marriage. However, he soon changes his mind again and jumps out the window. After only a short while, Agafya wonders where he has gone. Everyone searches for him, and eventually they discover that he has escaped through the window and called a cab to take him home. The play ends with Fyokla scolding Kochkaryov for his subpar matchmaking skills. If the groom escapes through the door the wedding can still be put back on track, she says, but if he jumps out the window it is all over.

== Editions and translations ==
There are many translations of Marriage into other languages, including one by Abdulla Qahhor into Uzbek.

- Gogol, Nikolai (1999). Three Plays. Translated by Mulrine, Stephen. London: Methuen Publishing Ltd. ISBN 0-413-73340-8. This volume also includes The Government Inspector and The Gamblers

== References to Marriage in other works ==
- In the novel Twelve Chairs by Ilf and Petrov, a theatre group performs an avant-garde production of The Marriage.
- The character of Podkolyosin is mentioned in Dostoevsky's novel The Idiot.
- The episode of Podkolyosin jumping out of the window is mentioned by Chirikov in Part 5, chapter 2 of Tolstoy's novel Anna Karenina.

== See also ==
- Zhenitba, an opera by Modest Mussorgsky
- The Marriage, an opera by Bohuslav Martinů
- Marriage, a 1936 film by Erast Garin
