= Marriage (1936 film) =

- Russian: Женитьба
- Directed by: Erast Garin; Khesya Lokshina
- Written by: Erast Garin; Khesya Lokshina; Nikolay Gogol (play)
- Based on: Marriage by Nikolai Gogol
- Produced by: G. Kharlamov
- Starring: Erast Garin; Stepan Kayukov; Aleksei Matov; A. Chekayevsky; Nina Latonina
- Cinematography: Anatoli Pogorely
- Music by: Andrei Pashchenko
- Release date: 1936
- Country: Soviet Union
- Language: Russian

Marriage (Russian: Женитьба) is a 1936 Soviet comedy film directed by Erast Garin.

== Plot ==
The film is based on the eponymous play by Nikolay Gogol.

The bureaucrat Podkolyosin is burdened by his bachelor life but is simultaneously afraid of disrupting his familiar routine. His friend Kochkaryov tries to match him with Agafya Tikhonovna, the daughter of a merchant. After much effort, Kochkaryov persuades his friend to visit the bride. However, at the last moment, Podkolyosin, fearful of the impending changes, runs away.

== Release history and disappearance ==
The surviving permit for the film is dated March 22, 1937. One of the pre-premiere screenings took place on April 6, 1937, at the House of Communist Education of Youth in Leningrad. The adaptation by Garin and Lokshina received positive feedback from notable figures such as Vsevolod Pudovkin, Sergei Yutkevich, Mikhail Koltsov, and Boris Eikhenbaum.

However, in August 1937, telegrams began circulating from the Main Administration of Cinematography, criticizing the film for allegedly "distorting Gogol's work". Film historians associate this criticism with the broader campaign against "Meyerholdism" and the persecution of Vsevolod Meyerhold, who was both the mentor and close associate of Erast Garin.

The filmmakers' attempt to interpret Gogol’s comedy as a “socially motivated trick comedy” led, according to press reviews, to a distortion of the content of the classic work of Russian literature.

— Soviet Feature Films. Annotated Catalog. Volume II. 1961

The last known screening of the film by Garin and Lokshina occurred in August 1941, when a copy was in the film library of the All-Union State Institute of Cinematography. After the war, the filmmakers made unsuccessful attempts to locate the film, contacting the State Film Archive of the USSR and inquiring with the Cinémathèque Française.

In the 2000s, the film was reconstructed using preserved editing sheets, surviving frames, and photographs taken during production. It premiered at the Kinotavr Festival in 2006 as part of the "Recovered Masterpieces" project.

== Cast ==
- Erast Garin as Podkolesin
- Stepan Kayukov as Kochkaryov
- Aleksei Matov as Anuchkin
- A. Chekayevsky as Starikov
- Nina Latonina as Agafya
- Zoya Fyodorova as Dunyasha
- Vera Streshnyova as Arina (as V. Streshneva)
- Olga Tomilina as Fyokla

== Sources ==
- Brusyanin, Vadim (29 October 2012). «Женитьба», которую никто не видел [“The Marriage” that no one has seen] (PDF). СК-новости (in Russian).
- Margolit, Е.; Shmyrov, V. (1995). Изъятое кино: 1924–1953 [Seized Cinema: 1924–1953] (in Russian). Moscpw: Дубль-Д. ISBN 5-900902-02-1.
- Советские художественные фильмы. Аннотированный каталог [Soviet Feature Films. Annotated Catalogue] (in Russian). Vol. 2: Sound Films (1930—1957). Moscow: Искусство. 1961.
