= Iakov Shafir =

Iakov Moiseyevich Shafir (1887-1938) headed a special commission sent by the Comintern to Georgia to investigate archival materials preserved after the flight of the Georgian government following the Red Army invasion of Georgia in 1921. He published a booklet on this Тайны меньшевистского царства which appeared in Russian in 1921, with an English translation, Secrets of Menshevik Georgia: The plot against Soviet Russia unmasked published by the Communist Party of Great Britain in 1922.

== Secrets of Menshevik Georgia ==
Shafir describes the stance of the Democratic Republic of Georgia (DRG) under the leadership of Noe Zhordania at the beginning of 1920. The Soviet government had proposed joint action against the Volunteer Army of Anton Denikin. Zhordania categorically refused, with the intention of maintaining strict neutrality in the Russian Civil War. "I prefer the imperialists of the West to the fanatics of the East" he declared. Shafir claims the DRG provided active assistance to both Denikin and Wrangel.

== Later career ==
Shafir developed a career as a journalist and conducted research into the sociology of reading. He wrote Газета и деревня (Newspaper and the Village, 1924) and Очерки психологии читателя (Essays on the Psychology of the Reader, 1927). A critical essay he wrote about Mikhail Zoshchenko was republished in an anthology in 2015.
