= Nikolai Tikhonov (writer) =

Soviet writer (1896–1979)

- Николай Семёнович Тихонов
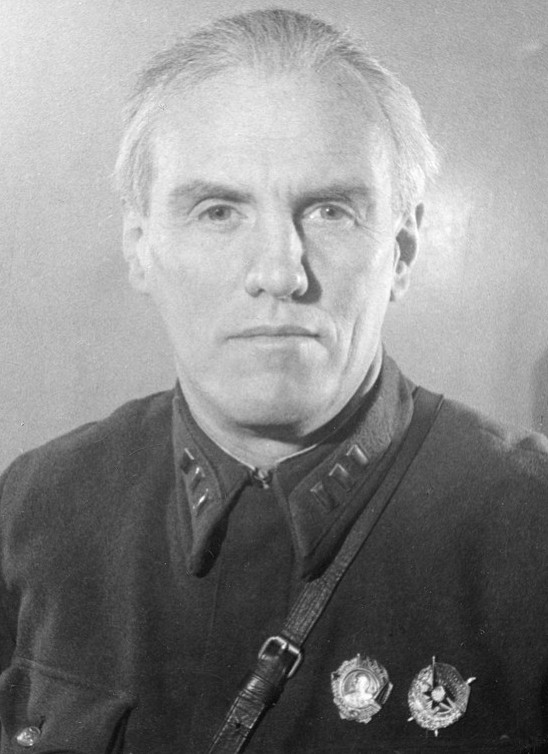
- Born: 4 December [O.S. 22 November] 1896; Saint Petersburg, Russian Empire
- Died: 8 February 1979 (aged 82); Moscow, Russian SFSR, Soviet Union
- Occupations: Poet; writer; humanitarian
- Writing career
- Notable awards: Three Stalin Prizes first degree (1942, 1949, 1950), Lenin Prize (1970), Shevchenko National Prize (1964)

Nikolai Semenovich Tikhonov (Russian: Николай Семёнович Тихонов; 4 December [O.S. 22 November] 1896 – 8 February 1979) was a Soviet writer, poet and public figure. Hero of Socialist Labour (1966).

== Biography ==
Born of parents who were petty tradesmen of serf descent, Tikhonov trained as a clerk and graduated from the Petersburg School of Commerce in 1911. He volunteered for the Imperial Russian Army at the outbreak of World War I and served in a hussar regiment. In 1918, he entered the Red Army, fought in the Russian Civil War, and was demobilized in 1922.

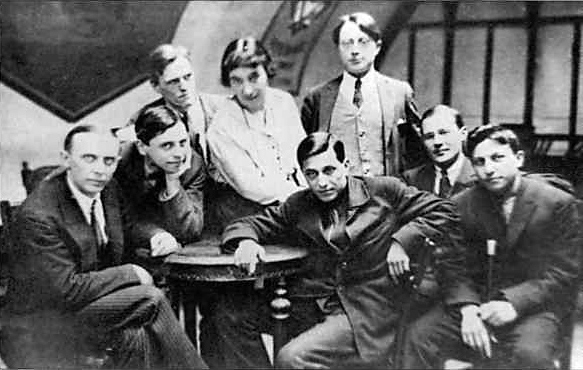
The Serapion Brothers (use a cursor to see who is who)

He began writing poetry at an early age. His first collection, Orda (The Horde, 1922), "shows startling maturity" and "contains most of the few short poems which have made him famous." After 1922, he devoted himself to traveling and writing, and his later work, both verse (the collection Ten' druga, or The Shadow of a Friend, 1936) and prose (many adventure stories and the novel Voina, or War, 1931) reflects his delight in what he found in his travels, particularly in Georgia. His cycle of war stories Voennye koni (Military Horses, 1927) is "perceptive and well constructed."

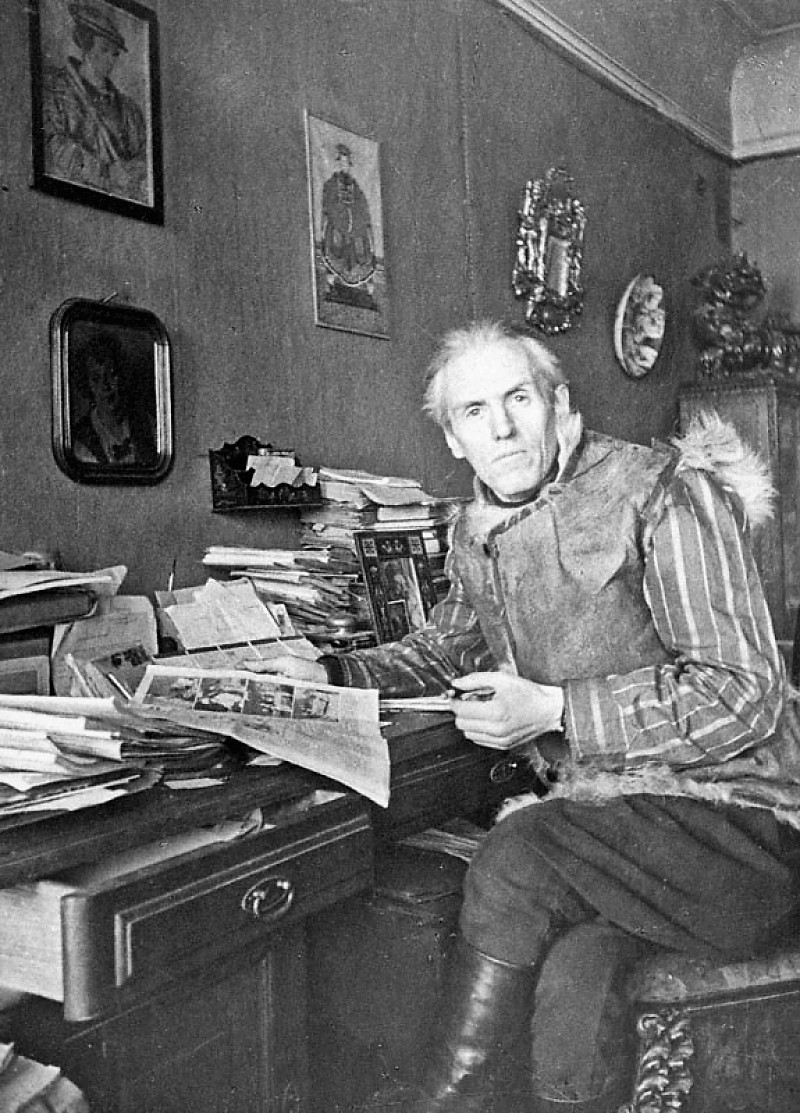
Tikhonov during the Siege of Leningrad

Tikhonov served on the Finnish front in the Winter War and was in Leningrad for the Siege. In 1944, he became chair of the Union of Soviet Writers, but was dismissed by Joseph Stalin in 1946 for being too tolerant of Zoshchenko and Akhmatova. However, he remained an important figure in Soviet literary circles, and was awarded the Lenin Peace Prize in 1957.

Some of his well-known ballads are "Ballada o gvozdyakh" ("Ballad About Nails"), "Ballada o sinem pakete" ("Ballad of the Blue Parcel"), and "Dezertir" ("The Deserter").

Tikhonov was the first chairman of the Soviet Peace Committee, serving from 1949 to 1979.
