= An Ordinary Miracle (1964 film) =

- Directed by: Erast Garin; Khesya Lokshina
- Written by: Erast Garin; Khesya Lokshina
- Starring: Oleg Vidov; Georgi Georgiu; Erast Garin
- Cinematography: Viktor Grishin
- Music by: Vladimir Tchaikovsky; L. Rapoport
- Production company: Gorky Film Studio
- Release date: 1964
- Running time: 94 minutes
- Country: Soviet Union
- Language: Russian

An Ordinary Miracle (Russian: Обыкновенное чудо, romanized: Obyknovennoye chudo) is a Soviet 1964 romantic fantasy film, directed by Erast Garin and based on a play by Yevgeni Shvarts.

King's palace was filmed in Vorontsov Palace. Garin himself plays the role of the King as he had in the successful production of the play in the 1950 production

== Plot ==
A wizard, having settled down and turned to a quiet domestic life, cannot resist temptation when he encounters a bear in the forest. Using a hazel twig, he crafts a magic wand and transforms the bear into a handsome young man. However, he imposes a single condition: the young man will revert to being a bear if he were ever kissed by a princess.

== Cast ==
- Aleksey Konsovsky as Khozyain
- Nina Zorskaya as Khozyayka
- Oleg Vidov as The Bear
- Erast Garin as The King
- Nelli Maksimova as The Princess
- Georgi Georgiu as Minister Administrator
- Aleksei Dobronravov
- Valentina Karavayeva
- Viktor Avdyushko
- Klavdiya Lepanova
- Svetlana Konovalova
- Yevgeni Vesnik as The Hunter
- Georgi Millyar

== See also ==
- An Ordinary Miracle (1978 film) - another adaptation of the same play.
