= Serapion Brothers =

Group of writers

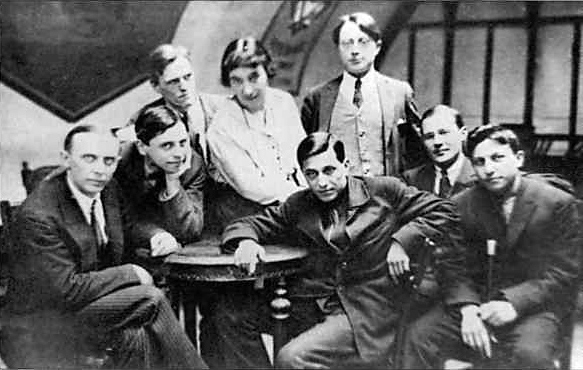
The Serapion Brothers (use a cursor to see who is who)

The Serapion Brothers (or Serapion Fraternity, Russian: Серапионовы Братья) was a group of writers formed in Petrograd, Russian SFSR in 1921. The group was named after a literary group, Die Serapionsbrüder (The Serapion Brethren), to which German romantic author E.T.A. Hoffmann belonged and after which he named a collection of his tales. Its members included Nikolai Tikhonov, Veniamin Kaverin, Mikhail Zoshchenko, Victor Shklovsky, Vsevolod Ivanov, Elizaveta Polonskaya, Ilya Gruzdev, Mikhail Slonimsky, Lev Lunts, Vladimir Pozner, Nikolai Nikolaevich Nikitin and Konstantin Fedin. The group formed during their studies at the seminars of Yuri Tynyanov, Yevgeni Zamyatin (whose 1922 essay "The Serapion Brethren" gives insight into the early style of several members), and Korney Chukovsky and the Petrogradsky Dom Iskusstv (Petrograd House of Arts). The group was officially organized at its first meeting on 1 February 1921, and "as long as their headquarters remained in the House of Arts, met regularly every Saturday."

The group eventually split: some of them moved to Moscow and became official Soviet writers, while others, like Zoshchenko, remained in Petrograd (Leningrad), or emigrated from the Soviet Russia. Hongor Oulanoff wrote, "The Serapion Brothers did not found a literary school. In fact - as it appears from the Serapion 'Manifesto' and from Fedin's words - the Brotherhood did not even intend to found one."

== Yevgeni Zamyatin and the Serapion Brothers ==
Yevgeni Zamyatin became associated with the Serapion Brothers in 1921, when he was appointed lecturer of the "House of Arts" (Dom Iskusstv) where the members of the Serapion Brothers studied and lived. The institute was located at a prestigious building on Nevsky Prospect in the former Palace of the St. Petersburg Governor. Writers, including the Serapions, had occupied the wing of the palace from Nevsky along the Moika river embankment. That location had originally inspired the phrase "Dom na naberezhnoi" (House on the embankment). Zamyatin and other writers lived there as a small community of intellectuals, as their lifestyle and artistic atmosphere was later described in their memoirs and letters.

At that time, Zamyatin fearlessly criticized the Soviet policy of Red Terror. He had already completed We and worked as an editor with Maxim Gorky on the "World Literature" project. Shklovsky and Kaverin described Zamyatin's lectures as provocative and stimulating. However, Zamyatin's famous statement that "True literature can be created only by madmen, hermits, heretics, dreamers, rebels, and skeptics" was largely misunderstood. The Serapion Brothers remained neutral, withdrawn and eventually became mainstream, among other, more innovative and experimental literature. Zamyatin became disillusioned with teaching them, and moved on.

== Yuri Tynyanov and the Serapions ==
Yuri Tynyanov supervised the studies and publications of Serapion Brothers since he met them at the "House of Arts" in St. Petersburg. He supported their soft non-conformism, their quiet opposition to the official Moscow-based Soviet literature. Ironically, many of them ended up making their careers in Moscow, as ranking members of the Union of Soviet Writers.

Most members of the Serapion Brothers gradually conformed to official socialist realism.

== Kornei Chukovsky and the Serapions ==
Kornei Chukovsky was a lecturer at the House of Arts, along with Zamyatin and Tynyanov. The Serapion Brothers attended most of the seminars of all three lecturers, albeit not for a long time. Eventually some members of the "Serapion Brothers" had followed Chukovsky in Moscow. There they continued their careers under his wing, and became established within the official Soviet socialist realism. His daughter Lydia Chukovskaya and Evgenia Lunts, sister of Lev Lunts, were best friends at school until the Lunts family moved to Hamburg, where Lunts died in 1924.

== Leon Trotsky and the Serapion Fraternity ==
Leon Trotsky gave a brief analysis of the Serapion Fraternity in the second chapter of his Literature and Revolution (1924). Trotsky characterises the group as young and naive; he is not sure what might be said about their coming maturity. He writes that they 'were impossible without the Revolution, either as a group, or separately.' He repudiated their claimed political neutrality: 'As if an artist ever could be "without a tendency", without a definite relation to social life, even though unformulated or unexpressed in political terms. It is true, that the majority of artists form their relation to life and to its social forms during organic periods, in an unnoticeable and molecular way and almost without the participation of critical reason.' But, only two years after their foundation, he admitted that his analysis was hardly likely to be definitive: 'Why do we relegate them to being "fellow-travelers" of ours? Because they are bound up with the Revolution, because this tie is still very unformed, because they are so very young and because nothing definite can be said about their tomorrow.'

== Maxim Gorky and the Serapion Fraternity ==
Most of the members of the Fraternity had no regular income and often were hungry and poorly clothed. They lived as a fraternity commune in a nationalized former palace in Petrograd and used among other sources the financial support of Maxim Gorky, even though the group considered the realistic novel and the style of socialist realism to be outdated and therefore called the works of their benefactor into question.

== Sources ==
- Trotsky, Literature and Revolution, Chapter 2 (analysis of the Fraternity).
- Hongor Oulanoff, The Serapion Brothers: Theory and Practice, Mouton, 1966 (the first book-length study of the group).
