= Mikhail Slonimsky =

Soviet writer (1897–1972)

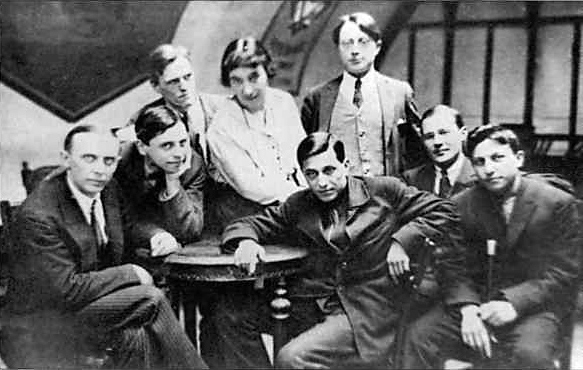
The Serapion Brothers (use a cursor to see who is who)

Mikhail Leonidovich Slonimsky (Russian: Михаи́л Леони́дович Слони́мский; 2 August [O.S. 21 July] 1897 – 8 October 1972) was a Soviet writer, member of the Serapion Brothers group, and a memoirist.

== Biography ==
Mikhail was born in Saint Petersburg to an Intelligentsia family. His grandfather, father and aunt were professional writers. His uncle Semyon Vengerov was a famous philologist and literary critic. His older brother Nicolas Slonimsky became well known in the United States as a musicologist.

In January 1915, after graduating from his gymnasium, Mikhail volunteered for the Russian Army to fight in World War I. He was awarded Saint George's Cross, was wounded, returned to the front, wounded again, and evacuated to the Petrograd (Saint Petersburg) hospital. Since 1917, Mikhail published his works regularly (his first publication was in the magazine New Satiricon of 1914). He was one of the founders of the Serapion Brothers group. The group met at his apartment and, according to some memoirs, he was the inventor of the name.

Later, Mikhail developed into a typical Soviet writer and an administrator of the Union of Soviet Writers. He was the chairman of the Leningrad branch of the Writers' Union from 1929 to 1932. He was also a member of the board of the Writers' Union of the USSR from 1934 to 1954.

He died in Leningrad in October 8, 1972, aged 75. Mikhail's son, Sergei Slonimsky, was a composer, and his cousin, Antoni Słonimski, was also a writer.
