= Konstantin Fedin =

Russian-Soviet writer and poet (1882–1977)

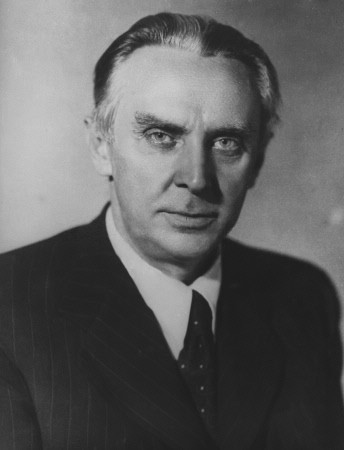
- Fedin, c. 1949
- Born: Konstantin Aleksandrovich Fedin; 24 February 1892; Saratov, Russian Empire
- Died: 15 July 1977 (aged 85); Moscow, Soviet Union
- Occupations: Poet, novelist
- Writing career
- Period: 1922–1977
- Genres: Fiction, poetry
- Notable works: Cities and Years
- Movement: Socialist realism

Konstantin Aleksandrovich Fedin (Russian: Константи́н Алекса́ндрович Фе́дин, IPA: [kənstɐnʲˈtʲin ɐlʲɪkˈsandrəvʲɪtɕ ˈfʲedʲɪn]; 24 February [O.S. 12 February] 1892 – 15 July 1977) was a Soviet and Russian novelist and literary functionary.

== Biography ==
Born in Saratov, Fedin studied in Moscow and Germany and was interned there during World War I. After his release, he worked as an interpreter in the first Soviet embassy in Berlin. On returning to Russia, he joined the Bolsheviks and served in the Red Army. After leaving the Party in 1921, he joined the literary group called the Serapion Brothers, who supported the Revolution, but wanted freedom for literature and the arts.

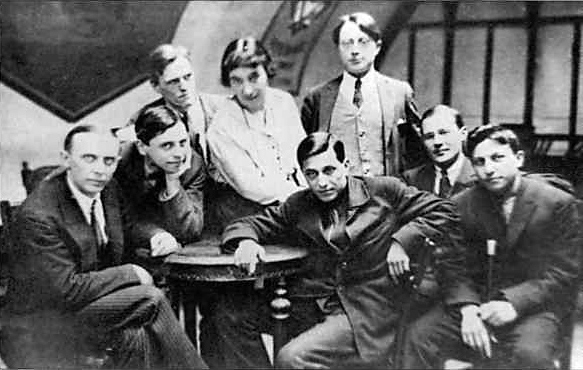
The Serapion Brothers (use a cursor to see who is who)

His first story, "The Orchard", was published in 1922, as was his play Bakunin v Drezdene (Bakunin in Dresden). His first two novels were Goroda i gody (1924; tr. as Cities and Years, 1962, "one of the first major novels in Soviet literature") and Bratya (Brothers, 1928). Both deal with the problems of intellectuals at the time of the October Revolution, and include "impressions of the German bourgeois world" based on his wartime imprisonment.

His later novels include Pokhishchenie Evropy (The rape of Europe, 1935), Sanatorii Arktur (The Arktur sanatorium, 1939), and the historical trilogy, Pervye radosti (First joys, 1945), Neobyknovennoe leto (An unusual summer, 1948), and Kostyor (The Fire, 1961–67). He also wrote a memoir Gorky sredi nas (Gorky among us, 1943).

== Political career ==
Fedin was a member of the Praesidium of the Union of Soviet Writers from its inception in 1934, and for years was head of the Board of Litfund "a powerful dispenser of all benefits and privileges to members of the Union". Litfund paid for the construction of a lavish new apartment building for writers. Osip and Nadezhda Mandelstam, who visited it in 1938, noted that Fedin had an apartment "crammed" with mahogany.

In 1938, the head of press department, A.E.Nikitin, sent a written complaint to Joseph Stalin and other party leaders warning that Fedin was the 'magnetic force' behind a group of writers who were organising a community independent of the head of the Writers' Union, Vladimir Stavsky

In 1959, he was appointed First Secretary of the Writers Union, in place of Aleksei Surkov, who was blamed for mishandling the repercussion of the award of the Nobel Prize in Literature to Boris Pasternak. In 1966, he was consulted by the Soviet leader, Leonid Brezhnev on whether the writers Andrei Sinyavsky and Yuli Daniel, who had secretly smuggled their work to be published abroad, should be dealt with by the Union, or put on trial. He reputedly "raised his hands in horror" and insisted that it was a criminal matter.

In July 1971, he was ousted as First Secretary of the Union, and from his position on Litfund, and replaced by Georgi Markov. Fedin was moved to the honorary post of President of the Union, which he held until his death in 1977.

== Personality ==
Edward J. Brown sums him up as follows: "Fedin, while he is probably not a great writer, did possess in a high degree the talent for communicating the atmosphere of a particular time and place. His best writing is reminiscent re-creation of his own experiences, and his memory is able to select and retain sensuous elements of long-past scenes which render their telling a rich experience."

Nadezhda Mandelstam was more scathing about him, asking rhetorically: "What does someone like Fedin have in common with a real Russian intellectual? Nothing - except perhaps spectacles and false teeth."

== Awards ==
- Hero of Socialist Labour (1967)
- Four Orders of Lenin
- Order of the Red Banner of Labour, twice
- Order of the October Revolution
- Stalin Prize, 1st class (1949) – for the novel "First Joy" (1945) and "No Ordinary Summer" (1947–1948)

== English Translations ==
- No Ordinary Summer, 2 vols, Foreign Languages Publishing House, Moscow, 1950.
- Sanatorium Arktur, Foreign Languages Publishing House, Moscow, 1957.
- Early Joys, Vintage, 1960.
- The Conflagration, Progress Publishers, Moscow, 1968.
- Cities and Years, Northwestern University Press, 1993.

== Sources ==
- Encyclopædia Britannica
- A.K. Thorlby (ed.), The Penguin Companion to Literature: European (Penguin, 1969).
