= Veniamin Kaverin =

Soviet and Russian writer, dramatist and screenwriter

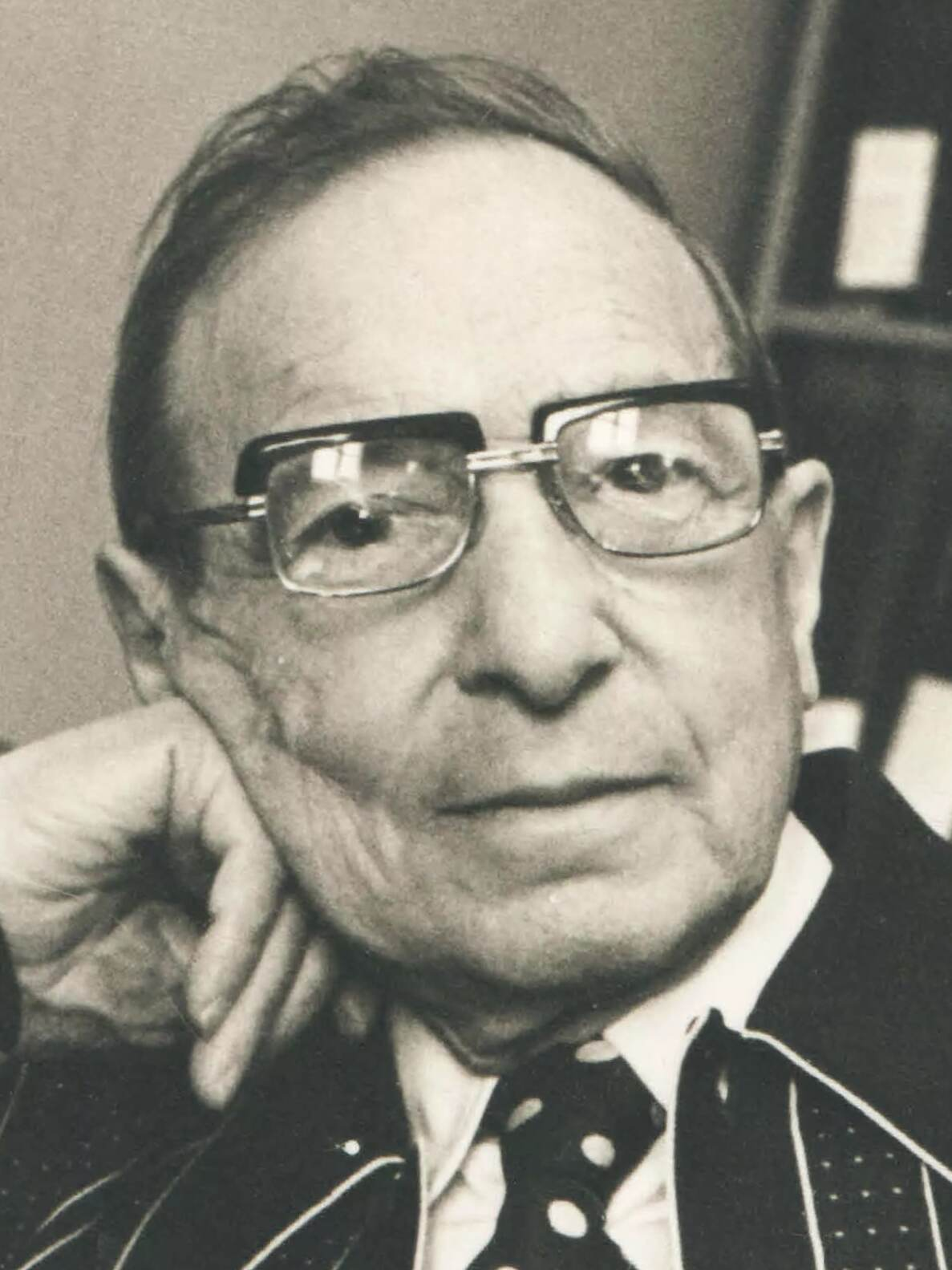
- Kaverin on 1970
- Born: Veniamin Abelevich Zilber; April 19, 1902; Pskov, Russian Empire
- Died: May 2, 1989 (aged 87); Moscow, Soviet Union
- Resting place: Vagankovo Cemetery
- Occupations: Writer, dramatist, screenwriter

Veniamin Aleksandrovich Kaverin (Russian: Вениами́н Алекса́ндрович Каве́рин; né Вениами́н А́белевич Зи́льбер (Veniamin Abelevich Zilber); 19 April [O.S. 6 April] 1902 – May 2, 1989) was a Soviet and Russian writer, dramatist and screenwriter associated with the early 1920s movement of the Serapion Brothers.

== Biography ==
Kaverin was born to the kapellmeister of the 96th Infantry Regiment out of Omsk, Abel Abramovich Zilber and his wife, Khana Girshevna Desson, who owned a chain of music stores. His elder sister, Leah Abelevna Zilber, married Yury Tynyanov, who was a classmate of Kaverin's older brother, Lev Zilber.

Kaverin studied at the Pskov Governorate Gymnasium and in 1923 graduated from the Leningrad Institute of Living Oriental Languages, specializing in Arabic. In 1924, he also graduated the history and philology faculty of the Leningrad State University. During that time he was close with members of OPOJAZ. Kaverin also married the younger sister of Yury Tynyanov, Lidia Nikolaevna, and had two children, Natalia and Nikolay.

During World War II evacuation in Yaroslavl, Kaverin completed his best-known novel, The Two Captains (1938–44), which colorfully recounts the adventures of Russian polar explorers before and after the Revolution. The book, awarded the Stalin Prize in 1946, was reissued 42 times in 25 years and was adapted for the screen twice, in 1955 and 1976.

In 1966, Kaverin published a revised version of his 1929 study of Osip Senkovsky, Baron Brambeus. Later, he worked on his reminiscences about the literary milieu of the 1920s, which contained passages highly critical of Soviet policies in literature.

As The Moscow News commented on his centenary, "Kaverin showed that even under the worst of conditions it is possible to retain one's human qualities and decency. His example is a reproach to so many other Soviet writers who sold their souls to the regime and committed reprehensible public acts".

He is buried at the Vagankovo Cemetery in Moscow.

== English translations ==
'The Larger View' Stackpole and Sons, 1938.

- Open Book, Lawrence & Wishart, 1955.
- The Unknown Artist, Hyperion Press, 1973.
- Two Captains, Raduga Publishers, 1989.
- Two Captains, Fredonia Books, 2003.

== See also ==
- Lev Zilber
- Microbiology
