= Mikhail Zoshchenko =

Soviet writer and satirist (1894–1958)

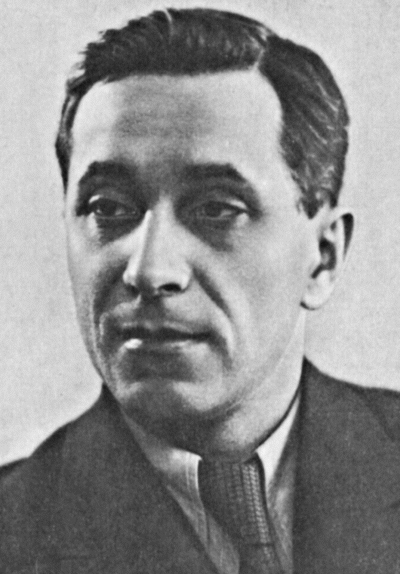
- Born: 10 August [O.S. 29 July] 1894; Saint Petersburg, Russian Empire
- Died: 22 July 1958 (aged 63); Leningrad, USSR
- Education: Saint Petersburg University
- Occupations: Short story writer, novelist, playwright, screenwriter
- Writing career
- Notable works: Youth Restored (1933); Before Sunrise (1943)

Mikhail Mikhailovich Zoshchenko (Russian: Михаи́л Миха́йлович Зо́щенко; 10 August [O.S. 29 July] 1894 – 22 July 1958) was a Soviet and Russian writer and satirist.

== Biography ==
Zoshchenko was born in 1894, in Saint Petersburg, Russia, according to his 1953 autobiography. Other sources suggest that he was born in Poltava, in present-day Ukraine. His Ukrainian father was an artist and a mosaicist responsible for the exterior decoration of the Suvorov Museum in Saint Petersburg. His mother was Russian. Zoshchenko attended the Faculty of Law at the Saint Petersburg University, but did not graduate due to financial problems. During World War I, Zoshchenko served in the army as a field officer, was wounded in action several times, and was heavily decorated. In 1919, during the Russian Civil War, he served for several months in the Red Army before being discharged for health reasons.

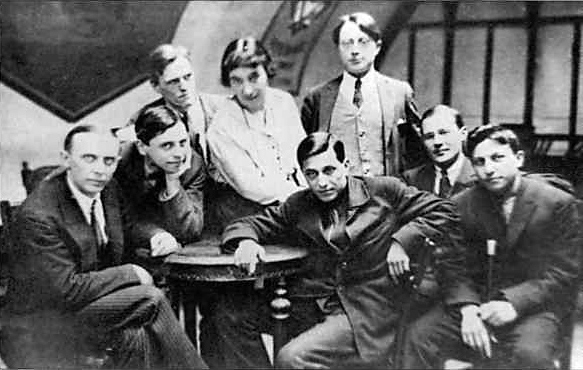
The Serapion Brothers (use a cursor to see who is who)

He was associated with the Serapion Brothers and attained particular popularity in the 1920s as a satirist, but, after his denunciation in the Zhdanov decree of 1946, Zoshchenko lived in dire poverty. He was awarded his pension only a few months before he died.

Zoshchenko developed a simplified deadpan style of writing which simultaneously made him accessible to "the people" and mocked official demands for accessibility: "I write very compactly. My sentences are short. Accessible to the poor. Maybe that's the reason why I have so many readers." Volkov compares this style to the nakedness of the Russian holy fool or yurodivy.

In 1940 Zoshchenko published a series of short stories for children about Vladimir Lenin.

== Anthology ==
A critical anthology Мих. Зощенко: pro et contra, антология was published in 2015. It included a 1926 article by Iakov Moiseyevich Shafir.

== Selected bibliography (in English translation) ==
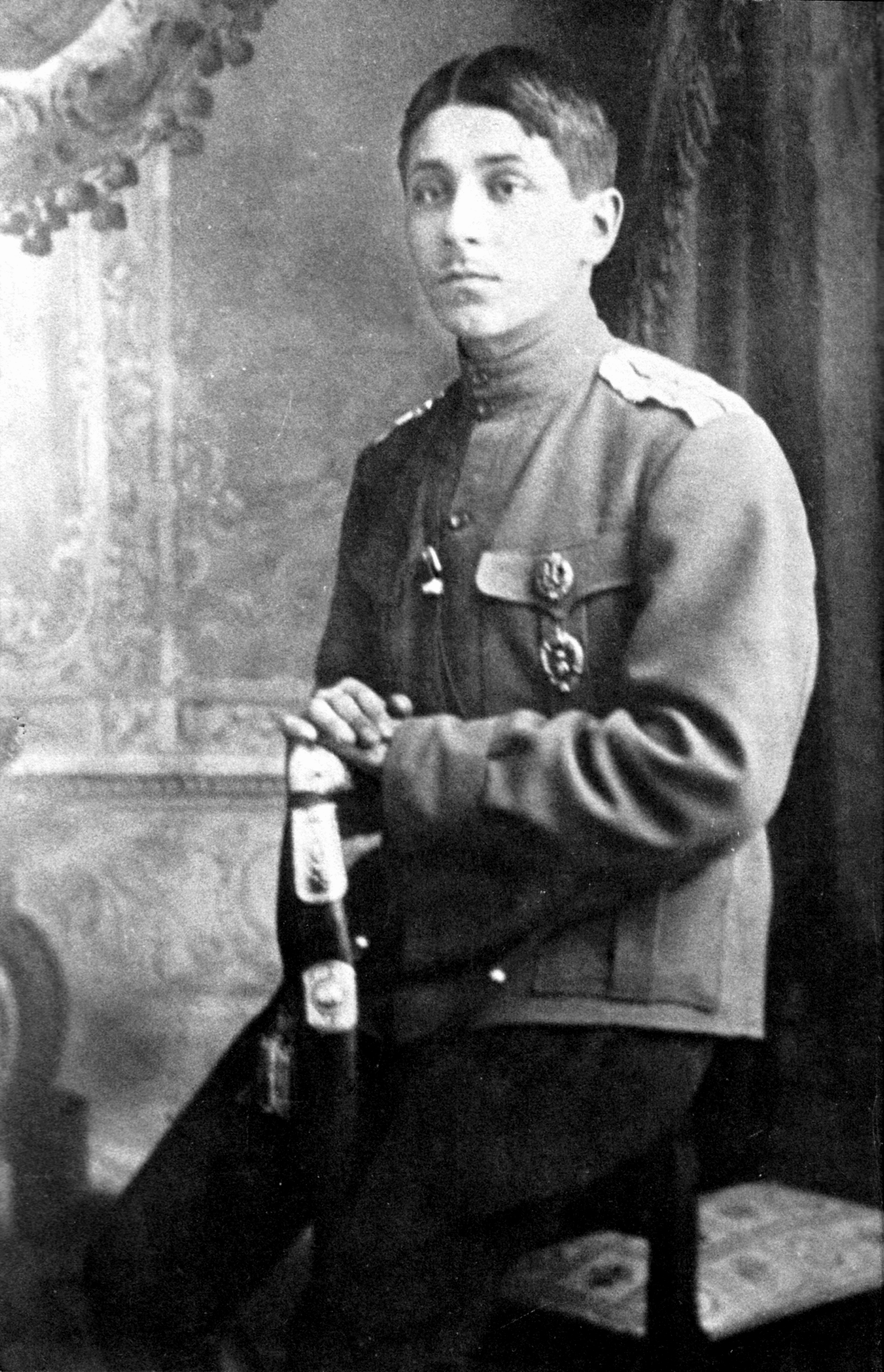
Zoshchenko in uniform, 1915/16.

- A Man Is Not A Flea, trans. Serge Shishkoff, Ann Arbor, 1989.
- Before Sunrise. Trans. Gary Kern, Ann Arbor, 1974.
- Nervous People and Other Satires, ed. Hugh McLean, trans. Maria Gordon and Hugh McLean, London, 1963.
- Scenes from the Bathhouse, trans. Sidney Monas, Ann Arbor, 1962.
- Youth Restored. Trans. Joel Stern, Ann Arbor, 1984.
- The Galosh. Trans. Jeremy Hicks, New York, 1996.
- Sentimental Tales. Trans. Boris Dralyuk, New York, 2018.
- Pассказы о Ленине ("Stories about Lenin". In Russian. Moscow, 1974.)
