= List of Russian philosophers =

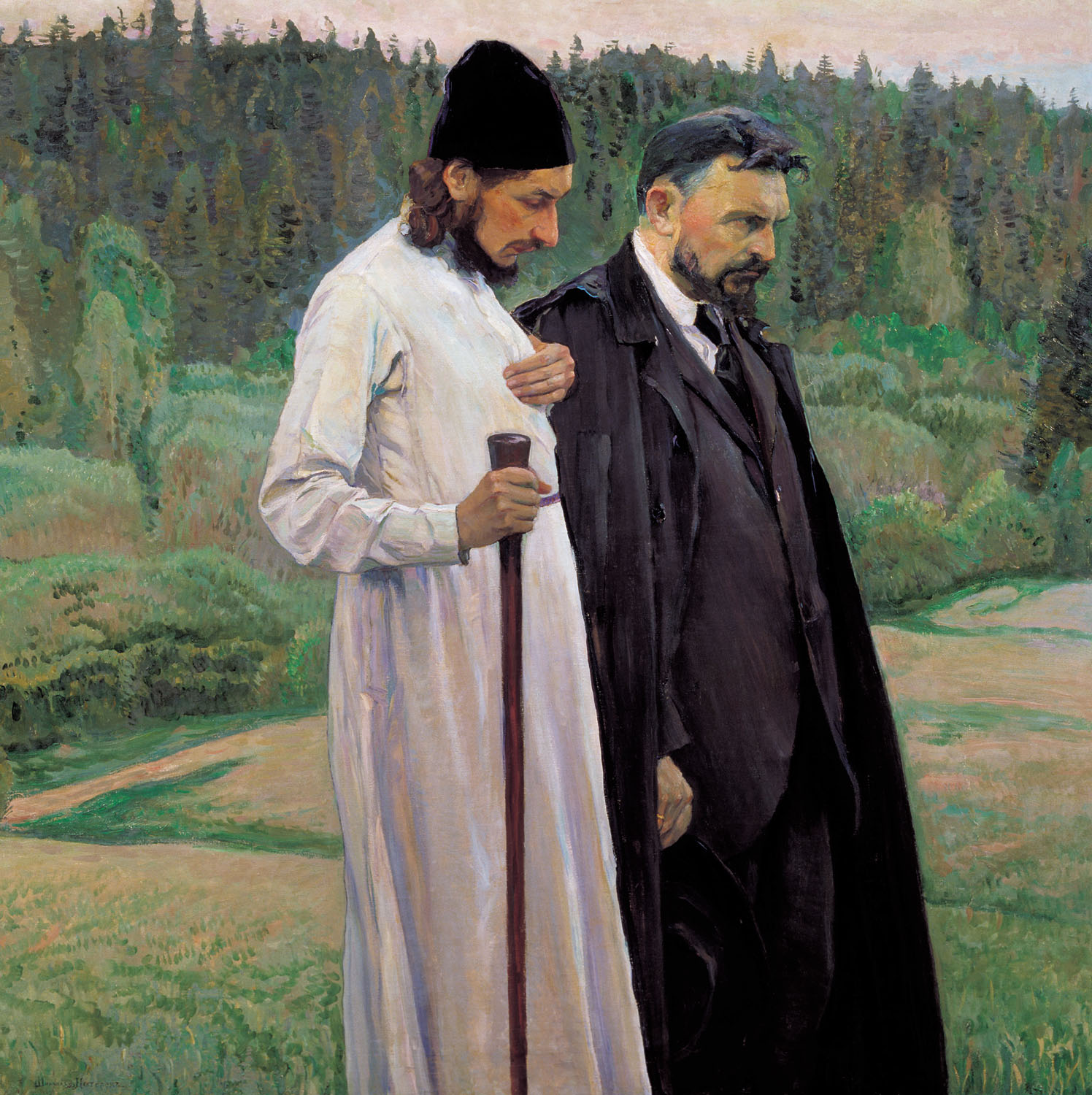
Philosophers (1917) by Mikhail Nesterov, depicting Pavel Florensky and Sergei Bulgakov

Russian philosophy includes a variety of philosophical movements. Authors who developed them are listed below sorted by movement.

While most authors listed below are primarily philosophers, also included here are some Russian fiction writers, such as Tolstoy and Dostoyevsky, who are also known as philosophers.

Russian philosophy as a separate entity started its development in the 19th century, defined initially by the opposition of Westernizers, advocating Russia's following the Western political and economical models, and Slavophiles, insisting on developing Russia as a unique civilization. The latter group included Nikolai Danilevsky and Konstantin Leontiev, the early founders of eurasianism. The discussion of Russia's place in the world has since become the most characteristic feature of Russian philosophy.

In its further development, Russian philosophy was also marked by deep connection to literature and interest in creativity, society, politics and nationalism; cosmos and religion were other notable subjects.

Notable philosophers of the late 19th and early 20th centuries include Vladimir Solovyev, Vasily Rozanov, Lev Shestov, Leo Tolstoy, Sergei Bulgakov, Pavel Florensky, Nikolai Berdyaev, Pitirim Sorokin, and Vladimir Vernadsky.

From the early 1920s to late 1980s, Russian philosophy was dominated by Marxism.

A handful of dissident philosophers survived through the Soviet period, among them Aleksei Losev. Stalin's death in 1953 gave way for new schools of thought to spring up, among them Moscow Logic Circle, and Tartu-Moscow Semiotic School.

== Major Thinkers ==
=== Russian Enlightenment ===
- Vasily Tatishchev (1686–1750)
- Gregory Skovoroda (1722–1794)
- Mikhail Shcherbatov (1733–1790)
- Andrey Bolotov (1738–1833)
- Alexander Radishchev (1749–1802)

=== Slavophiles and pochvennichestvo ===
- Ivan Kireyevsky (1806–1856)
- Aleksey Khomyakov (1804–1860)
- Vladimir Odoyevsky (1803–1869)
- Konstantin Aksakov (1817–1860)
- Yuri Samarin (1819–1876)
- Fyodor Tyutchev (1803–1873)
- Nikolay Danilevsky (1822–1885)
- Nikolay Strakhov (1828–1896)
- Fyodor Dostoevsky (1821–1881) Religious philosopher artist (see Nikolai Berdyaev)
- Konstantin Pobedonostsev (1827–1907)
- Konstantin Leontiev (1831–1891)
- Ivan Ilyin (1883–1954)

=== Russian symbolists ===
- Dmitry Merezhkovsky (1866–1941)
- Zinaida Gippius (1869–1945)
- Valery Bryusov (1873–1924)
- Konstantin Balmont (1867–1942)
- Max Voloshin (1877–1932)
- Vsevolod Meyerhold (1874–1940)
- Alexander Blok (1880–1921)
- Andrei Bely (1880–1934)
- Vyacheslav Ivanov (1866–1949)
- Innokenty Annensky (1855–1909)
- Fyodor Sologub (1863–1927)
- Georgy Chulkov (1879–1939)

=== Westernizers ===
- Pyotr Chaadayev (1794–1856)
- Nikolai Stankevich (1813–1840)
- Vissarion Belinsky (1811–1848)
- Alexander Herzen (1812–1870) Father of Russian Socialism
- Andrey Grigoryevich Zdravomyslov (1928-2008)

=== Russian Schellingians ===
- Pyotr Chaadayev (1794–1856)
- Dmitry Venevitinov (1805–1827)
- Vissarion Belinsky (1811–1848)
- Vladimir Solovyov (1853–1900)

=== Russian positivists ===
- Peter Lavrovich Lavrov (1823–1900)
- Grigory Vyrubov (1843–1913)
- Nikolay Mikhaylovsky (1842–1910)
- Konstantin Kavelin (1818–1885)
- Vladimir Lesevich (1837–1905)
- Nikolai Korkunov (1853–1904)

==== Russian Machists ====
- Vladimir Bazarov (1874–1939)
- Jakov Berman
- Alexander Bogdanov (1873–1928)
- Sergei Suvorov
- Pavel Yushkevich (1873–1945)

=== Russian cosmists ===
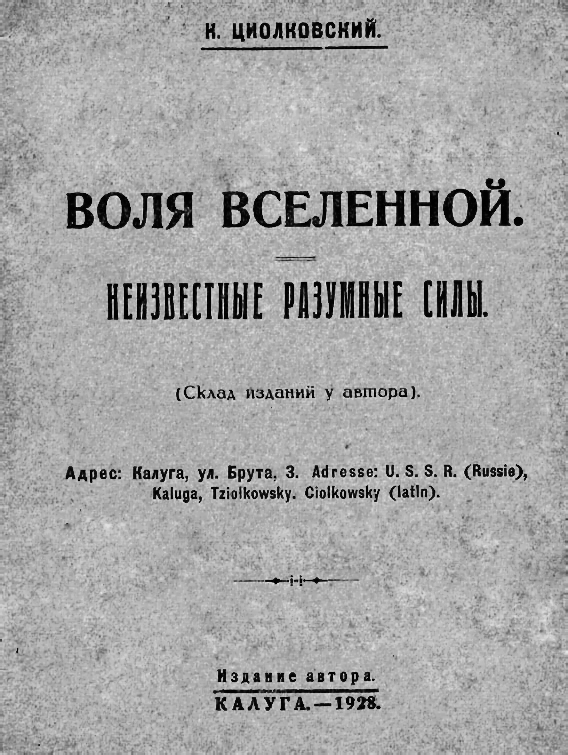
The cover of the book The Will of the Universe. Intellect Unknown. Mind and Passions by Konstantin Tsiolkovsky, 1928

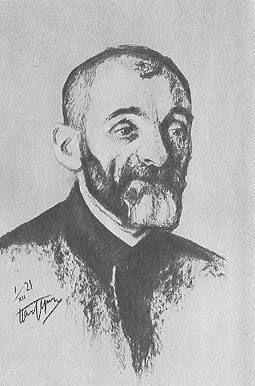
Portrait of Lev Shestov by Leonid Pasternak, 1910

- Nikolay Fyodorov (1829–1903) N O Lossky lists Fyodorov as primarily a Christian philosopher.
- Nicholas Roerich (1874–1947)
- Vladimir Vernadsky (1863–1945)
- Konstantin Tsiolkovsky (1857–1935)
- Alexander Chizhevsky (1897–1964)
- Evald Ilyenkov (1924–1979)
- Victor Skumin (1948–)

=== Occultists ===
- Nikolay Novikov (1744–1818)
- Helena Blavatsky (1831–1891)
- G. I. Gurdjieff (1872–1949)
- P. D. Ouspensky (1878–1947)

=== Epistemologists, logicians and metaphysicians ===
- Boris Chicherin (1828–1904)
- S. N. Trubetskoy (1862–1905)

=== Narodniks ===
- Alexander Herzen (1812–1870) Father of Russian Socialism
- Nikolai Tchaikovsky (1851–1926)
- Pyotr Lavrov (1823–1900)
- Nikolay Mikhaylovsky (1842–1904)
- Lev Tikhomirov (1852–1923) (later prominent conservative thinker)
- Razumnik Ivanov-Razumnik (1878–1946)

=== Anarchists ===
- Mikhail Bakunin (1814–1876), also listed among the materialist and nihilist theorists
- Sergey Nechayev (1847–1882), Political Activist, Anarchism theorist
- Leo Tolstoy (1828–1910), whom some consider the greatest of Russian novelists
- Peter Kropotkin (1842–1921), known as the 'Anarchist Prince' or 'Father of Anarchism'

=== Materialists and nihilists ===
- N. G. Chernyshevsky (1828–1889)
- Dimitri Pisarev (1840–1868)
- Ivan Sechenov (1829–1905)

=== Socialists and Marxists ===
- George Plekhanov (1856–1918) The first major Russian Marxist thinker
- Vladimir Lenin (1870–1924) The founder of Leninism
- Alexandra Kollontai (1872–1952)
- Alexander Herzen (1812–1870)
- Leon Trotsky (1879–1940) The founder of Trotskyism
- Nikolai Bukharin (1888–1938)
- Sofya Yanovskaya (1896–1966)
- Aleksandr Zinovyev (1922–2006)
- Evald Ilyenkov (1924–1979)
- Aleksandr Voronsky (1884–1937)

=== Christian philosophers ===
Pre-Solovyov

- Pamfil Yurkevich (1826–1874)
- Vladimir Solovyov (1853–1900) noted to have created the first complete encompassing system of Russian philosophy
- Anna Schmidt (1851-1905)
- Vasily Rozanov (1856–1919)
- Fyodor Dostoyevsky (1821–1881) also listed as an existentialist
- Sergei Bulgakov (1871–1944)
- Nikolai Berdyaev (1874–1948) also listed as an existentialist
- Semyon Frank (1877–1955)
- Count Leo Tolstoy (1828–1910) also listed as the greatest of novelists and an anarchist

=== Orthodox Christian theologians ===
- Aleksey Khomyakov (1804–1860)
- Pavel Florensky (1882–1937)
- Vladimir Lossky (1903–1958)
- Georges Florovsky (1893–1979)
- Michael Pomazansky (1888–1988)
- Alexander Schmemann (1921–1983)
- John Meyendorff (1926–1992)

=== Intuitivist-personalists ===
- Aleksei Kozlov (1831–1901)
- Leo Lopatin (1855–1920)
- Nikolai Lossky (1870–1965)
- Semyon Frank (1877–1950)
- Aleksei Losev (1893–1988)

=== Existentialists ===
- Fyodor Dostoyevsky (1821–1881)
- Lev Shestov (1866–1938)
- Nikolai Berdyaev (1874–1948)

=== Aestheticians ===
- Alexei Losev (1893–1988)
- Mikhail Bakhtin (1895–1975)
- Mikhail Epstein (Epshtein) (1950–)

=== Historians of thought ===
- Isaiah Berlin (1909–1997)
- Razumnik Ivanov-Razumnik (1878–1946)

=== Globalists ===
- Alexander Chumakov (1950–)

== See also ==
- Philosophy in the Soviet Union
- Philosophers' ship
- Russian literature
- Valentin A. Bazhanov
- Lev Gumilev
- Aleksandr Dugin
- Dmitry Likhachev
- Daniil Andreyev
- Vasily Nalimov
- Victor Ovcharenko
- Karen A. Swassjan
- Nicolai A. Vasiliev
- Sergei O. Prokofieff
- Alexander Zinoviev
- Geydar Dzhemal

== Bibliography ==
- History of Russian Philosophy (История российской Философии) (1951) by N. O. Lossky. Publisher: Allen & Unwin, London. International Universities Press Inc NY, NY sponsored by Saint Vladimir's Orthodox Theological Seminary.
- A History of Philosophy, Volume 10: Russian Philosophy (1986) by Frederick Copleston. Publisher: Continuum, London.
- A history of Russian Philosophy (2 vols.) by Vasilii Vasilevich Zenkovsky; translator George L. Kline Publisher: Routledge & Kegan Paul (1953).
- Russian Philosophy. English-Russian Dictionary (ed. Vasily Vanchugov). Moscow, People's Friendship University of Russia, 2005.
