= Aleksei Aleksandrovich Kozlov =

Russian philosopher

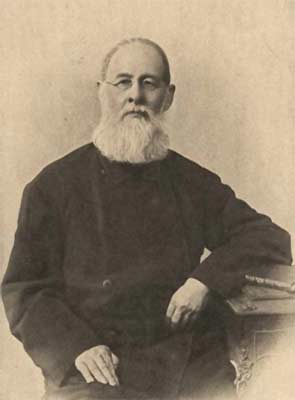
Aleksei Kozlov.

Aleksei Aleksandrovich Kozlov (Russian: Алексей Александрович Козлов; 20 February 1831 – 12 March 1901) was a Russian philosopher known for his contributions to Russian idealism. He is recognized as the founder of the "neo-Leibnizian" movement in Russia, which involved updating the ideas of philosopher Gottfried Wilhelm Leibniz, as well as the works of R.H. Lotze and Gustav Teichmüller. Kozlov's philosophy is also considered a precursor to Russian personalist metaphysics.

Kozlov's influence on Russian philosophy extended beyond his own ideas. He played a crucial role in defending speculative philosophy against the dominant positivism of his time. Kozlov's legacy is significant due to his contributions to the development of Russian philosophy at the end of the 19th century and the ongoing impact of his philosophical ideas in the 20th century.

== Biography ==
Aleksei Kozlov was born in 1831 in Moscow. Initially, he studied physics and mathematics, but later obtained a degree in literature in 1854. Kozlov was drawn to the ideas of Ludwig Feuerbach and Charles Fourier, which led him to develop socialist views. His beliefs resulted in a brief prison term in 1866 and the loss of his teaching position at a Moscow secondary school.

Kozlov delved into philosophy in the 1870s, influenced successively by Arthur Schopenhauer, Eduard von Hartmann, and Immanuel Kant. He became a professor of philosophy at Kyiv University in 1876, where he founded the first Russian philosophical journal, Filosofskii trekhmesiachnik (Philosophical Quarterly). During this time, he developed his own mature position under the influence of Leibniz and his followers, such as Hermann Lotze and Gustav Teichmüller.

After retiring due to illness in 1887, Kozlov moved to Saint Petersburg and published his views systematically in a private journal called Svoe slovo (A Personal Wor), which was occasionally published from 1888 to 1898. He died in Saint Petersburg in the spring of 1901.

== Philosophy ==
Kozlov was an advocate for a panpsychist metaphysics and developed a form of monadology, in which monads were capable of essential interaction, unlike Leibniz's theory of pre-established harmony. Kozlov conceptualized these monads as spiritual and conscious, serving as the basis for all reality. They formed a closed totality grounded in a Supreme Substance, God, within which each monad was connected to the others.

Kozlov viewed the human body as a collection of less conscious spiritual substances, which the ego interacted with until death. He suggested that after death, the ego is reincarnated through the interaction with other spiritual substances to form a new body.

The Russian philosopher Nikolay Lossky was highly influenced by Kozlov's ideas, and in a 1901 article entitled "Kozlov: His Panpsychism", Lossky expounded upon Kozlov's system.

== See also ==
- Leo Lopatin
- Nikolay Lossky
- Vladimir Solovyov
- List of Russian philosophers
