= Demon (poem) =

1829–1839 poem by Mikhail Lermontov

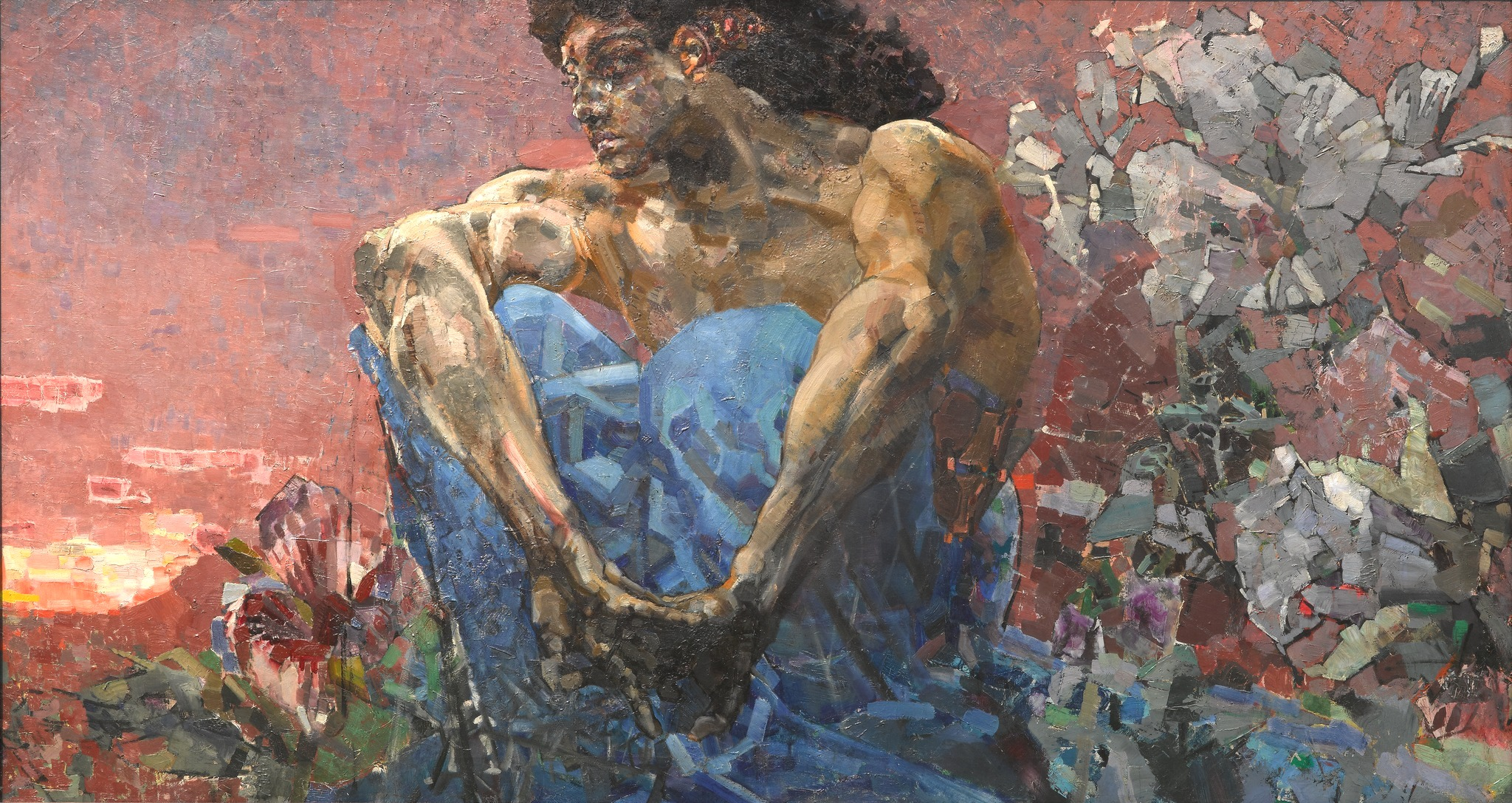
The Demon Seated, Lermontov's Demon as interpreted by Mikhail Vrubel, 1890

Demon (Russian: Демон) is a poem by Mikhail Lermontov, written in several versions in the years 1829 to 1839. It is considered a masterpiece of European Romantic poetry.

Lermontov began work on the poem when he was about 14 or 15 but completed it only during his Caucasus exile. Lermontov wrote six major variations of the poem, and the final version was not published until 1842, after his death.

== Summary ==
The poem is set in the Caucasus Mountains. It opens with the eponymous protagonist wandering the earth, hopeless and troubled. He dwells in infinite isolation, his immortality and unlimited power a worthless burden. Then he spies the beautiful Princess Tamara, dancing for her wedding, and in the desert of his soul wells an indescribable emotion.

The Demon, acting as a brutal and powerful tyrant, destroys his rival: at his instigation, robbers come to despoil the wedding and kill Tamara's betrothed. The Demon courts Tamara; she fears him, yet in him she sees not a demon nor an angel, but a tortured soul. First, she asks her father to send her to a monastery, understanding that she is being tormented by an evil spirit. Eventually she yields to his embrace, but his kiss is fatal. And though she is taken to Heaven, the Demon is left again "Alone in all the universe, / Abandoned, without love or hope!...".

== Gallery ==
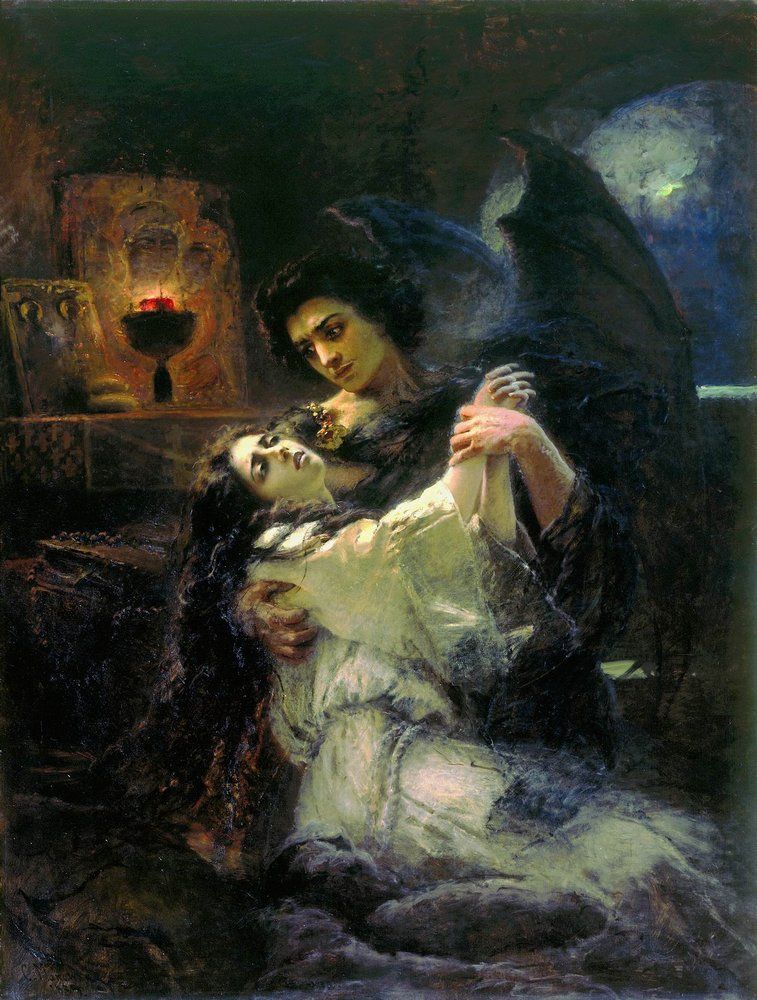
Tamara and the Demon - Konstantin Makovsky, 1889

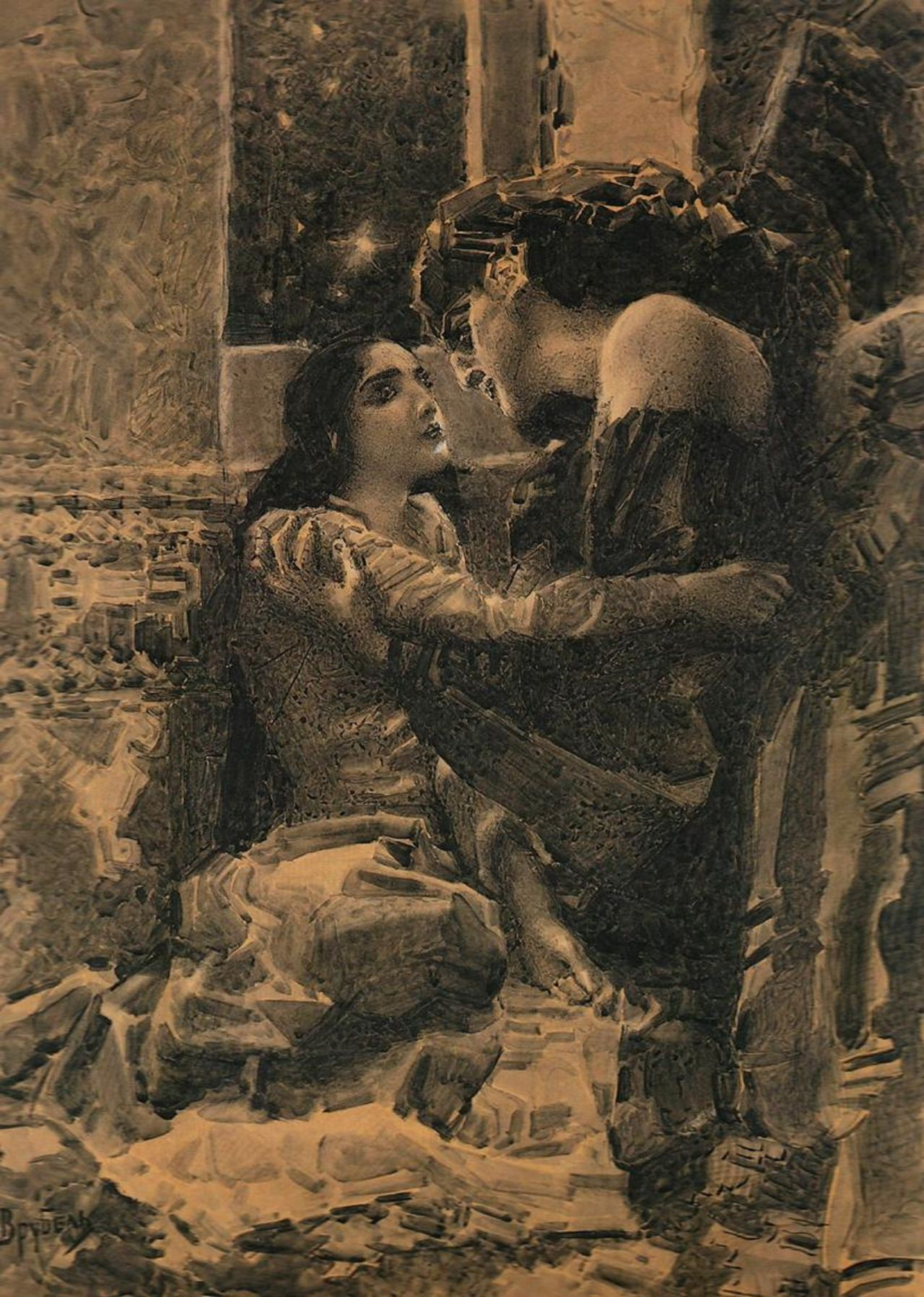
Tamara and the Demon - Mikhail Vrubel, 1890

== See also ==
- The Demon, an opera by Anton Rubinstein based on the poem
