= The Demon Downcast =

1902 painting by Mikhail Vrubel

- Демон поверженный (Russian)
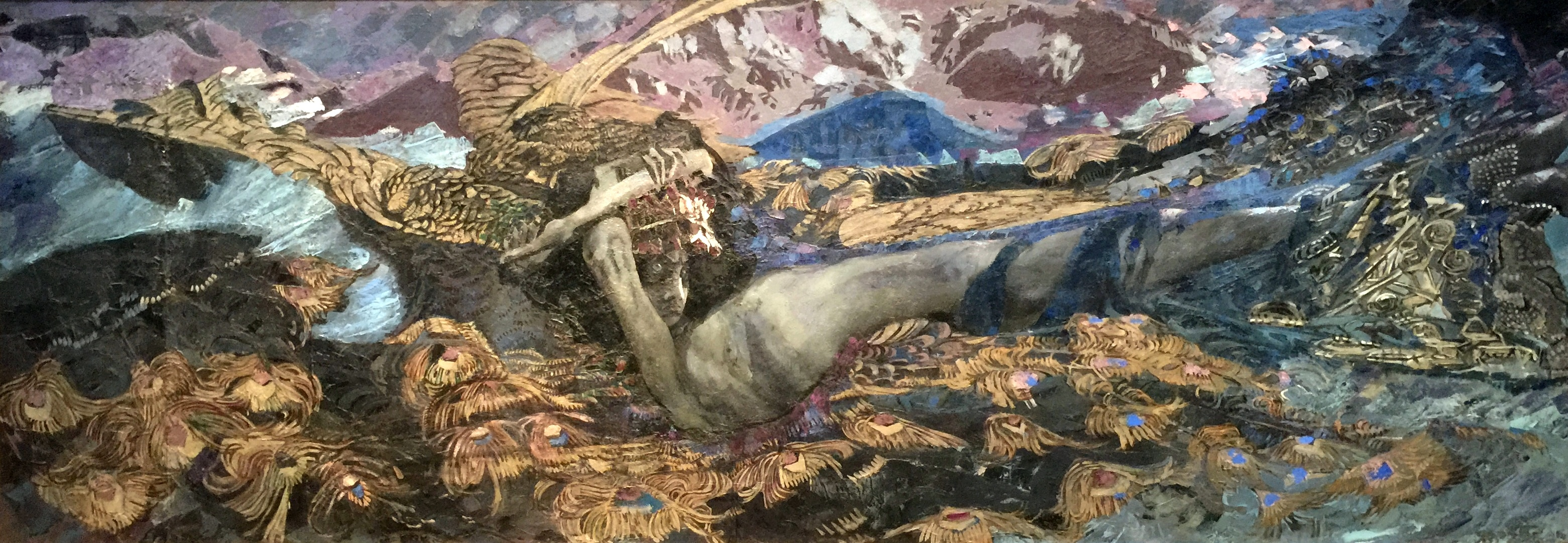
- Artist: Mikhail Vrubel
- Year: 1902
- Medium: Oil on canvas
- Dimensions: 139 cm × 387 cm (55 in × 152 in)
- Location: Tretyakov Gallery; Moscow, Russia

The Demon Downcast (Russian: Демон поверженный) is a piece by the Russian painter Mikhail Vrubel, created around 1901–1902.

== Description ==
The painting was made on canvas with oil. Its background is a mountainous area in a scarlet sunset. The composition emphasizes the constraint of the demon's figure, as if pressed between the upper and lower bars of the frame. The painting is created in Vrubel's unique style with the effect of crystal edges, which makes his paintings look like stained glass or panels. That effect was achieved with plain strokes made with a painting knife.

== History ==
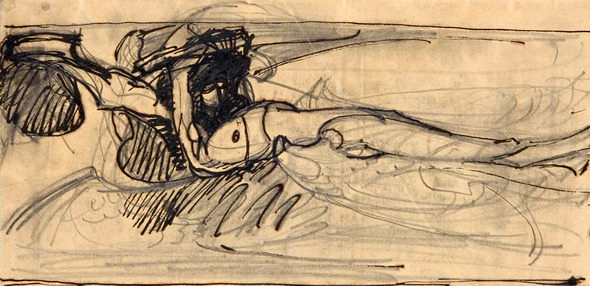
A sketch, 1901

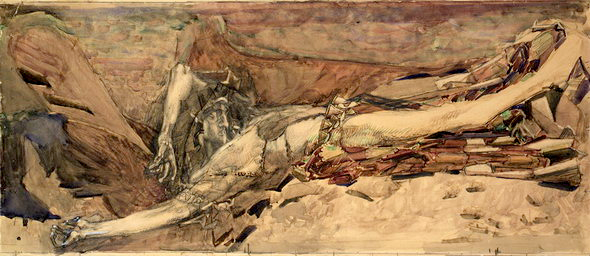
A sketch, 1901

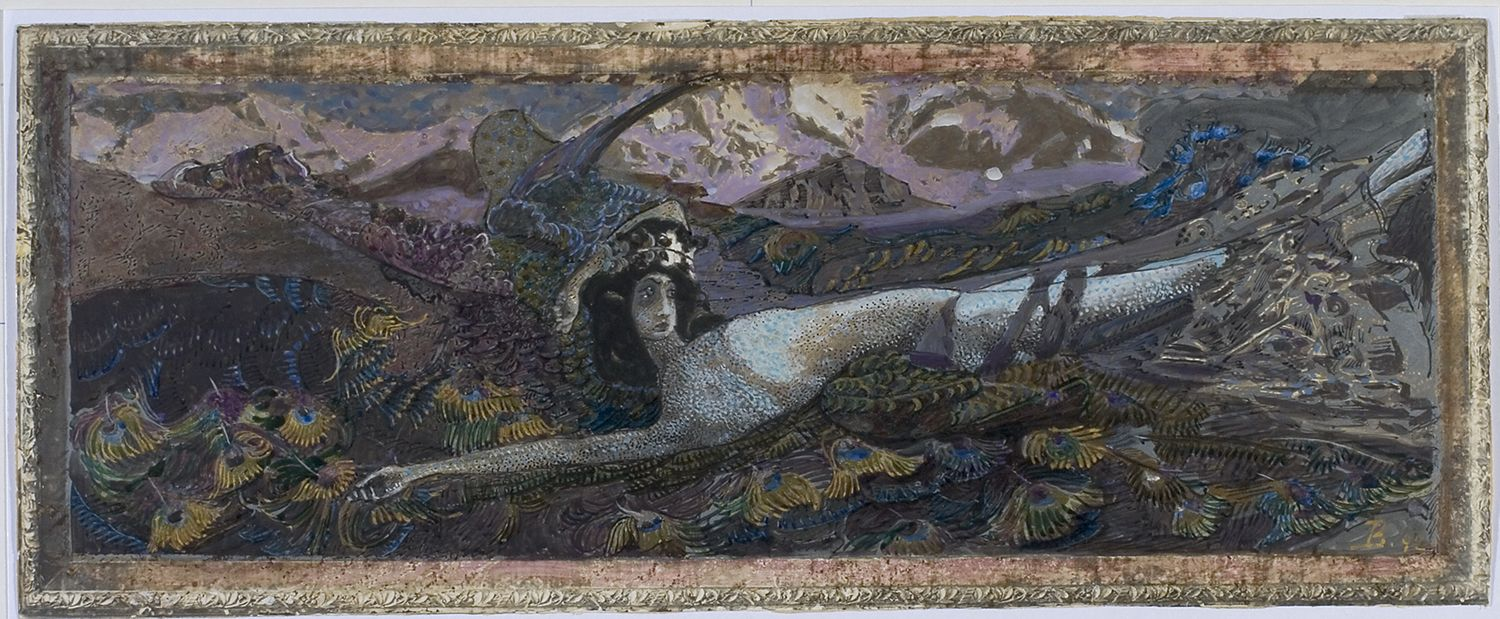
A sketch, 1901

In 1900, Vrubel approached the theme of "Demons" again. Having not yet finished the piece The Demon Flying (1900), in 1901 the painter started drawing preliminary sketches for the painting The Demon Downcast. As Vladimir von Meck recalled,

near the drawing-room, there was a small room decorated with an arch. Along its entire length, from the window to the wall, a giant canvas stood. Vrubel broke it down in squares with a rope and coal. His face was excitedly cheerful. “I begin,” he said.

Vrubel suddenly sent a note to von Meck asking to send photos of the Caucasian mountains: “I won’t fall asleep until I get them!” Upon receiving photos of Elbrus and Kazbek soon afterward, that night behind the demon's back grew pearl-coloured peaks, “fanned with the eternal cold of death”. While Vrubel was considered sane in general, people around him noted his irritability. Despite the mainly negative responses of contemporary critics, his popularity among painting lovers grew over time. In autumn of 1901, his spouse Nadezhda Zabela wrote to her sister:

Recently, delegates of the Vienna Secession had lunch with us. Very nice Viennese artists, they are delighted with Misha and want to take everything to an exposition; unfortunately, his “Demon” will be too late for this exposition. He has a lot of work in general. Everyone requires his sketches and his advice, invite him to expositions, elect him a member of various societies; they only pay a little money, but his glory grows. S. I. Mamontov has left jail and also requires Misha’s sketches.

The Demon Downcast was finished in December 1901 and displayed for several days in Moscow as an unfinished painting.

=== Exposition of Mir Iskusstva ===
In early 1902, The Demon Downcast was brought from Moscow to an exhibition organized by the society “Mir Iskusstva” in Saint Petersburg. The painting made a real sensation. While the exposition was held, Vrubel came to this painting every morning, and until the noon, while there were few visitors, he redrew the demon, wiped away and imposed dyes, changed the figure's pose and the background, but most changes were made in the demon's face. Alexandre Benois, who had observed Vrubel's attempts to change the finished painting, wrote:

One can believe the Prince of the World posed for him. There is something deeply true in these terrible and wonderful paintings, agitating to tears. His Demon was faithful to his nature. He who came to love Vrubel still deceived him. Those seances were entirely scorn and mockery. Vrubel saw now one, now another side of his deity, now both of them, and in the pursuit after that subtlety, he started quickly moving toward the abyss which his passion for the occult pushed him to.

Vladimir von Meck, one of the organizers of the exhibition, and his uncle Nikolai acquired many canvases of Vrubel's. This included a variant of Demon, when in 1902 the board of directors of the Tretyakov Gallery decided to not buy it. Later, in 1908, the Demon was sold to Tretyakov Gallery, where it is situated until now, being its most prominent exhibit. In early 1902, people around Vrubel began to notice symptoms of a developing mental disorder in him. His wife told her sister Ekaterina Ge about that as follows:

All relatives and acquaintances noticed something was going wrong with Mikhail Aleksandrovich, but they still constantly doubted, because there was never any nonsense in his speech; he recognized all, remembered all. He only became much more self-confident, ceased feeling shy with people and spoke incessantly. By that time, the painting Demon was brought to St. Petersburg for an exposition of “Mir Iskusstva”, and Mikhail Aleksandrovich, though the painting was already on display, redrew it every day since the early morning, and I saw with terror that there were changes every day. There were days when Demon was very dreadful, and later deep sadness and new beauty appeared in the expression of Demon’s face again… In general, despite the disorder, artistic ability did not leave Vrubel; it's even as though it grew, but it already became unbearable to live with him.

Finally, they had to institutionalize Vrubel with a mania. The painter would imagine himself as Christ, then Pushkin, and then believed he would become the General-Governor of Moscow; then he turned into the Russian sovereign, and then he suddenly became Skobelev or Phryne. He heard choirs of voices, claimed to have lived in the Renaissance age and painted walls in the Vatican together with Raphael and Michelangelo. Vrubel was examined by the psychiatrist Vladimir Bekhterev who first discovered the painter's mental disorder.

== Other Demons ==
The image of a demon often appears in Mikhail Vrubel's art. In 1890 he drew the painting The Demon Seated. In 1899, he created The Demon Flying where the demon is depicted as a mighty ruler of the world.

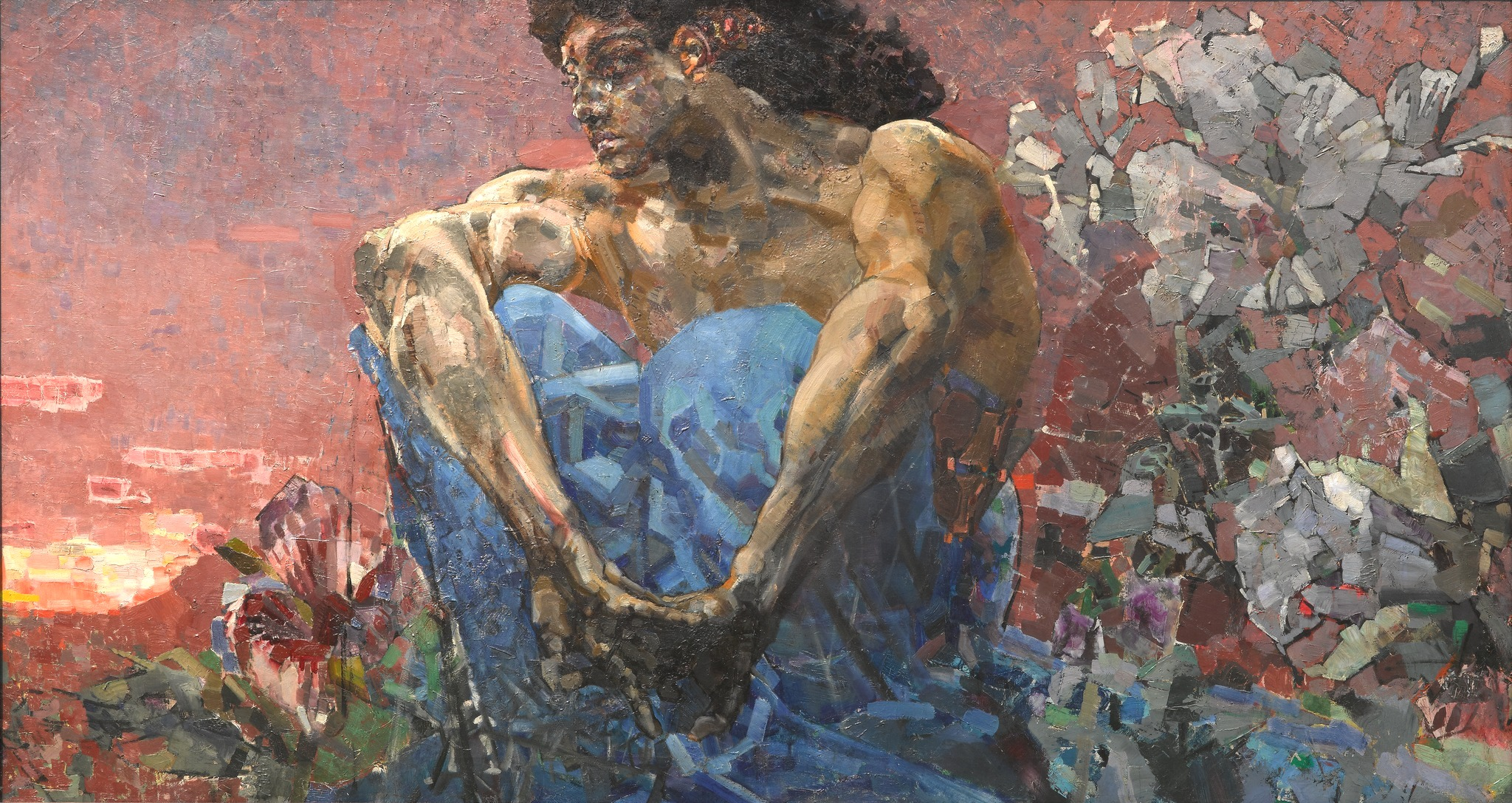
The Demon Seated, 1890

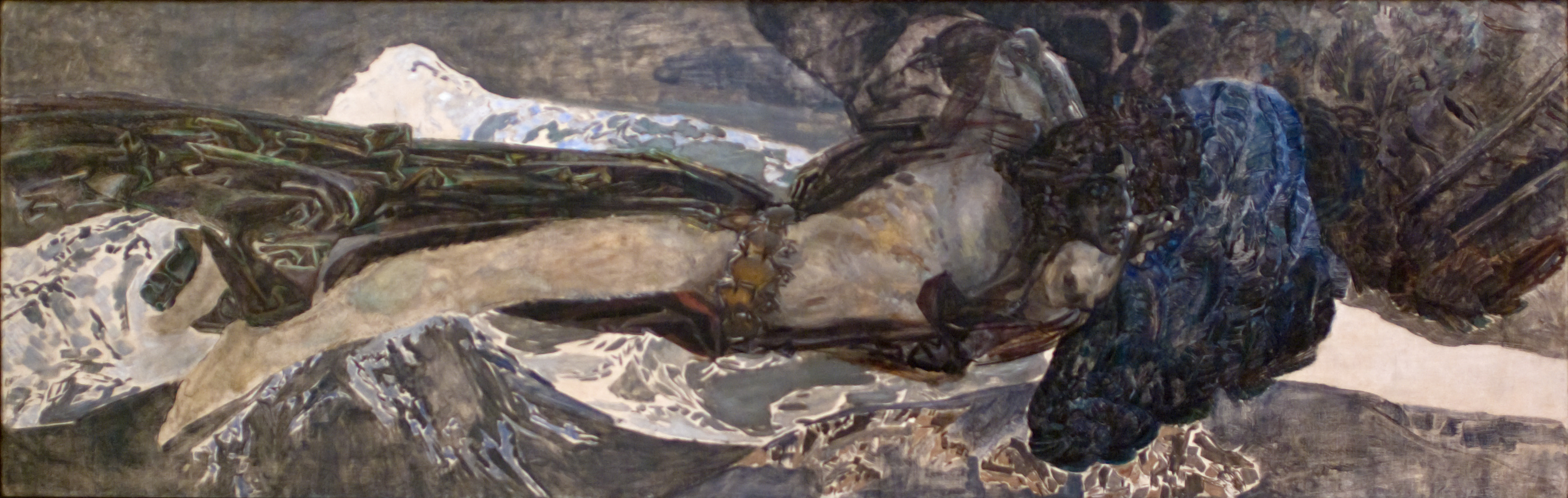
The Demon Flying, 1899
