= Pyotr Chaadayev =

Russian philosopher (1794–1856)

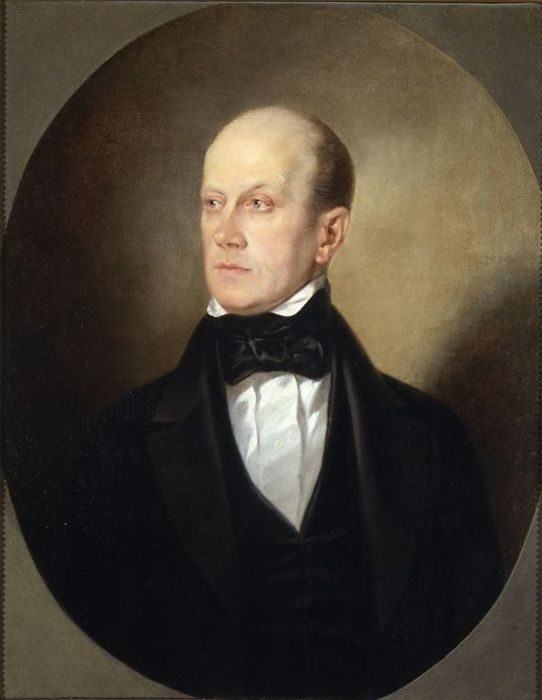
- Portrait by A. Kozina
- Born: Pyotr Yakovlevich Chaadayev; June 7, 1794; Moscow, Russian Empire
- Died: April 26, 1856 (aged 61); Moscow, Russian Empire
- Awards: Pour le Mérite (1812); Order of Saint Anna, 4th class (1812); Kulm Cross (1812)

Education
- Education: Imperial Moscow University

Philosophical work
- Era: 19th-century philosophy
- Region: Russian philosophy
- School: Christian philosophy
- Main interests: Philosophy
- Notable works: Les lettres philosophiques (1836)

Pyotr or Petr Yakovlevich Chaadayev (Russian: Пётр Я́ковлевич Чаада́ев; also spelled Chaadaev; 7 June [27 May O.S.] 1794 – 26 April [14 April O.S.] 1856) was a Russian philosopher. He was one of the Russian Schellingians.

Chaadayev was born in Moscow into a wealthy noble family. He interrupted his education to join the military and served with distinction in the Napoleonic Wars. Chaadayev wrote eight "Philosophical Letters" about Russia in French between 1826 and 1831, which circulated among intellectuals in Russia in manuscript form for many years. They comprise an indictment of Russian culture for its laggard role far behind the leaders of Western civilization. He cast doubt on the greatness of the Russian past, and ridiculed Orthodoxy for failing to provide a sound spiritual basis for the Russian mind. He extolled the achievements of Europe, especially in rational and logical thought, its progressive spirit, its leadership in science, and its leadership on the path to freedom.

The Russian government saw his ideas as dangerous and unsound. After some were published, they were all banned by the censorship process. Because there was nothing to charge him with, Chaadayev was declared legally insane and put under constant medical supervision, though this was a formality rather than a real administrative abuse.

== Biography ==
Chaadayev was born in Moscow on 7 June [O.S. 27 May] 1794. His family was part of the landed nobility; he was of Lithuanian descent on his father's side. (Note: The family name of the Chaadayevs probably derives from the Mongol name Chaʿadai (Chagatai), which was the name of the second son of Genghis Khan.) His maternal grandfather was Prince Mikhail Shcherbatov, a well-known intellectual who wrote A Discourse on the Corruption of Morals in Russia. After the early deaths of his mother and father, he was brought up by his uncles and aunts. He was educated by French and German governesses and teachers and became totally fluent in French early in his life; he was also able to read well in German.

Chaadayev enrolled at Imperial Moscow University in 1808 but left without completing his studies in 1811. He joined the Semenovsky Guard Regiment as a cadet officer and fought against the 1812 French invasion of Russia. He participated in the battles of Borodino, Kulm, and Leipzig and received the Iron Cross and the Order of Anna, Fourth Class. He was among the Russian soldiers who entered Paris with Tsar Alexander I in April 1814. He returned to Russia in 1816 and interacted with the tsar and the court in connection with several official assignments. He was chosen to serve at the imperial court, but he suddenly resigned in 1821 for unclear reasons. Philosopher George Kline write that one likely reason was his "proud independence and his unwillingness, despite the high honor involved, to become what he called […] a kind of elegant 'plaything.'" From 1823 to 1826 he travelled in Europe, so he was out of Russia during the 1825 Decembrist insurrection, though he was questioned on his return about his connections with many of the Decembrists. These connections may have contributed to his failure to find a position in the new administration of Emperor Nicholas I (r. 1825–1855).

Chaadayev befriended Alexander Pushkin (1799–1837) and became a model for Chatsky, the chief protagonist of Alexander Griboyedov's play Woe from Wit (1824). During the 1840s Chaadayev was an active participant in Moscow literary circles.

== Philosophy ==
The main thesis of his famous Philosophical Letters was that Russia had lagged behind Western countries and had contributed nothing to the world's progress and concluded that Russia must start de novo. The Letters included criticism of Russia's intellectual isolation and social backwardness.

When in 1836 the first edition (and only one published during his life) of the philosophical letters was published in the Russian magazine Telescope, its editor was exiled to the Far North of Russia. The Slavophiles at first mistook Chaadayev for one of them, but later, on realizing their mistake, bitterly denounced and disclaimed him. Chaadayev fought Slavophilism all of his life. His first Philosophical Letter has been labeled the "opening shot" of the Westernizer-Slavophile controversy which was dominant in Russian social thought of the nineteenth century. He wrote in his "first letter":

We are an exception among people. We belong to those who are not an integral part of humanity but exist only to teach the world some type of great lesson.

Upon reading the first Philosophical Letter, Tsar Nicholas I wrote in the margin that only a madman could have expressed the views it contained, a comment that shortly thereafter caused Chaadayev to be declared insane, though the judgment may also have been based on Chaadayev's "eccentricities and nervous peculiarities." Chaadayev's case may have been the first recorded incident in Russia in which psychiatry was used to suppress dissent.

Living under house arrest following his declaration of insanity, Chaadayev's next work was entitled, fittingly, "Apologie d'un Fou" (which has been translated as "Apology of a Madman" but may better be translated as "Apologia of a Madman") (1837). It opens with a quote from Samuel Coleridge stating "O my brethren! I have told / Most bitter truth, but without bitterness." In this brilliant but uncompleted work he maintained that Russia must follow her inner lines of development if she was to be true to her historical mission.

His ideas influenced both the Westernizers (who supported bringing Russia into accord with developments in Europe by way of various degrees of liberal reform) and Slavophiles (who supported Russian Orthodoxy and national culture). According to historian Raymond T. McNally, Chaadayev cannot be placed in either grouping. His positive appraisal of the historical role played by the Catholic Church set him apart from both Slavophiles and Westernizers, as did his idea of a "new Christian universal socio-cultural organization". His negative attitude towards contemporary European political and social developments, such as secularism and constitutionalism, also distinguished him from the Westernizers. Like the Slavophiles, Chaadayev saw religion as "the basis of all culture," but he did not share their views on Russian Orthodoxy or Peter the Great.

According to Chaadayev, Russian history had not developed normally and lacked intellectual and cultural continuity. This was because Russians never had a "great, universal spiritual ideal" to motivate them. He saw Peter the Great as the first leader to attempt to impart historical consciousness to the Russian people by connecting them with European history. In his view, Russian leaders should follow Peter's example and adopt only the beneficial parts of European culture. He saw this is a step towards his ultimate goal: the establishment of "the kingdom of God on earth, the intellectual, moral, and cultural unification of mankind."

Most of his works have been edited by his biographer, Mikhail Gershenzon (two volumes, Moscow, 1913–14), whose study of the philosopher was published at Saint Petersburg in 1908.

== Works ==
=== Books ===
- Oeuvres choisies de Pierre Tchadaief publiées pour la première fois par le P[ère] Gagarin, edited by Ivan Sergeevich Gagarin, S.J. (Paris & Leipzig: A. Franck, 1862).
- Sochineniia i pis'ma P. Ia. Chaadaeva, 2 volumes, edited by Mikhail Osipovich Gershenzon (Moscow: A. I. Mamontov, 1913-1914).
- Lettres philosophiques adressées à une Dame, edited by François Rouleau (Paris: Librairie des Cinq continents, 1970).
- Stat'i I pis'ma, edited by Boris Nikolaevich Tarasov (Moscow: Sovremennik, 1987; enlarged edition, 1989).
- Sochineniia, edited by V. Iu. Proskurina (Moscow: Izd-vo Pravda, 1989).
- Oeuvres inédites ou rares, edited by Raymond T. McNally, Rouleau, and Richard Tempest (Meudon, France: Bibliothèque slave, Centre d'études russes, 1990).
- Polnoe sobranie sochinenii i izbrannye pis'ma, 2 volumes, edited by S. G. Blinov, Z. A. Kamensky, and others (Moscow: Izd-vo Nauka, 1991).

=== Editions in English ===
- Philosophical Letters and Apology of a Madman, translated by Mary-Barbara Zeldin (Knoxville: University of Tennessee Press, 1969).
- The Major Works of Peter Chaadaev: A Translation and Commentary, translated by McNally (Notre Dame, Ind.: University of Notre Dame Press, 1969).
- Philosophical Works of Peter Chaadaev, in Sovietica, edited by McNally and Richard Tempest, volume 56 (Dordrecht & Boston: Kluwer Academic Publishers, 1991).

== Sources ==
- .
- Glazov, Yuri (November 1986). "Chaadaev and Russia's destiny". Studies in Soviet Thought. 32 (4): 281–301. doi:10.1007/BF00831732. JSTOR 20100185.
- McNally, Raymond T. (1964). "The Significance of Chaadayev's Weltanschauung". The Russian Review. 23 (4): 352–361. doi:10.2307/126212. ISSN 0036-0341. JSTOR 126212.
- Mendosa, M. A. (2014). Uno scrittore russo del primo '800: Pëtr Jakovlevič Čaadaev. Mantova: Universitas Studiorum. ISBN 978-88-97683-50-6.
