= Palette knife =

Artist's equipment

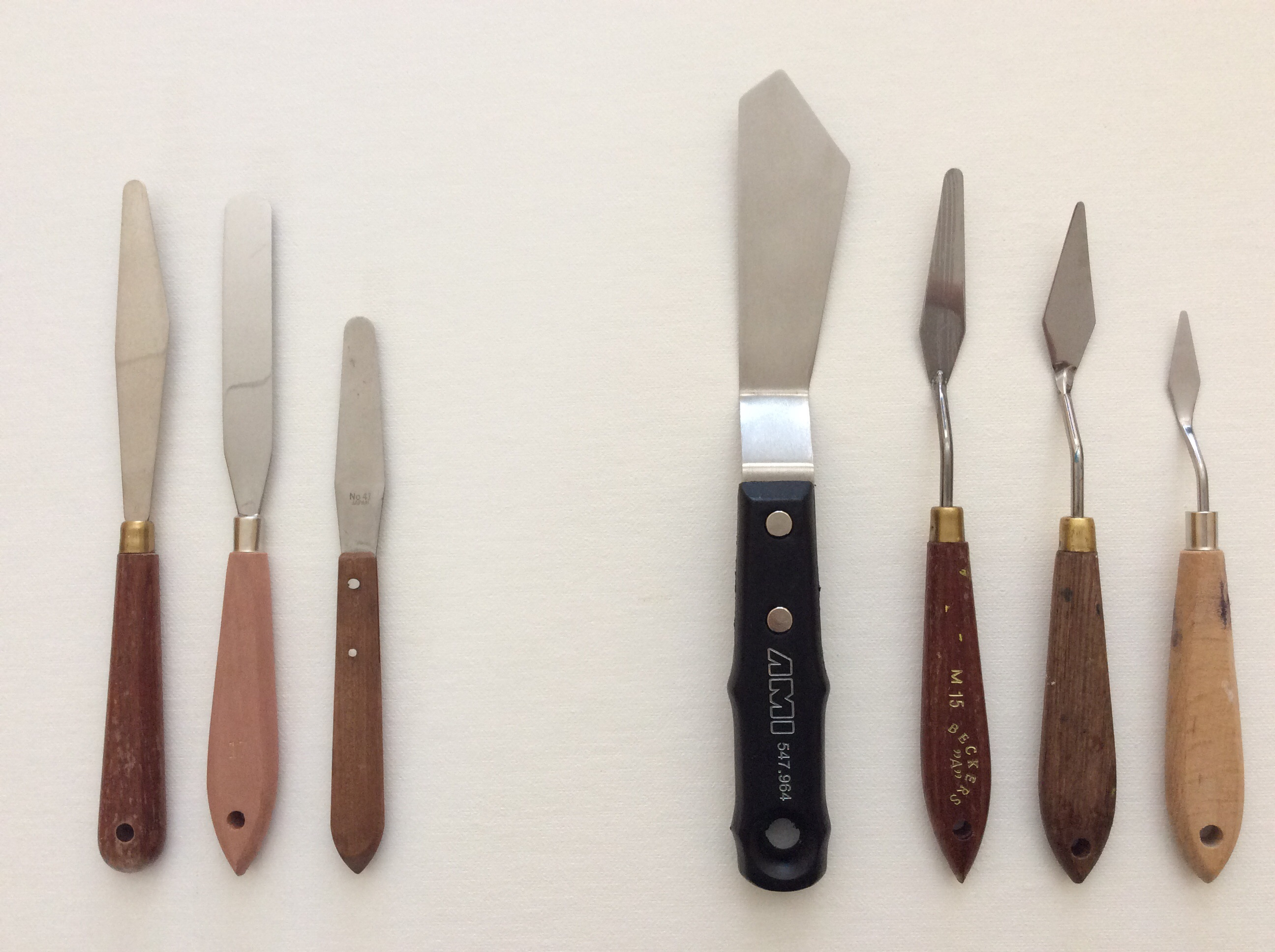
Palette knives (left) and painting knives (right)

A palette knife is a blunt tool used for mixing or applying paint, with a flexible steel blade. It is primarily used for applying paint to the canvas, mixing paint colors, adding texture to the painted surface, paste, etc., or for marbling, decorative endpapers, etc. The "palette" in the name is a reference to an artist's palette which is used for mixing oil paint and acrylic paints.

Art knives come primarily in two types:

- palette knife resembling a putty knife with a rounded tip, suited for mixing paints on the palette;
- painting knife with a pointed tip, lowered or "cranked" like a trowel, suited to painting on canvas.

While palette knives are manufactured without sharpened cutting edges, with prolonged use they may become "sharpened" by the action of abrasive pigments such as earth colors.

Palette knives are also used in cooking, where their flexibility allows them to easily slide underneath pastries or other items. See frosting spatula.

Bob Ross often used a palette knife in his works.

== See also ==
- Palette (painting)
