= The Demon Seated =

1890 painting by Mikhail Vrubel

- Демон (сидящий) (Russian)
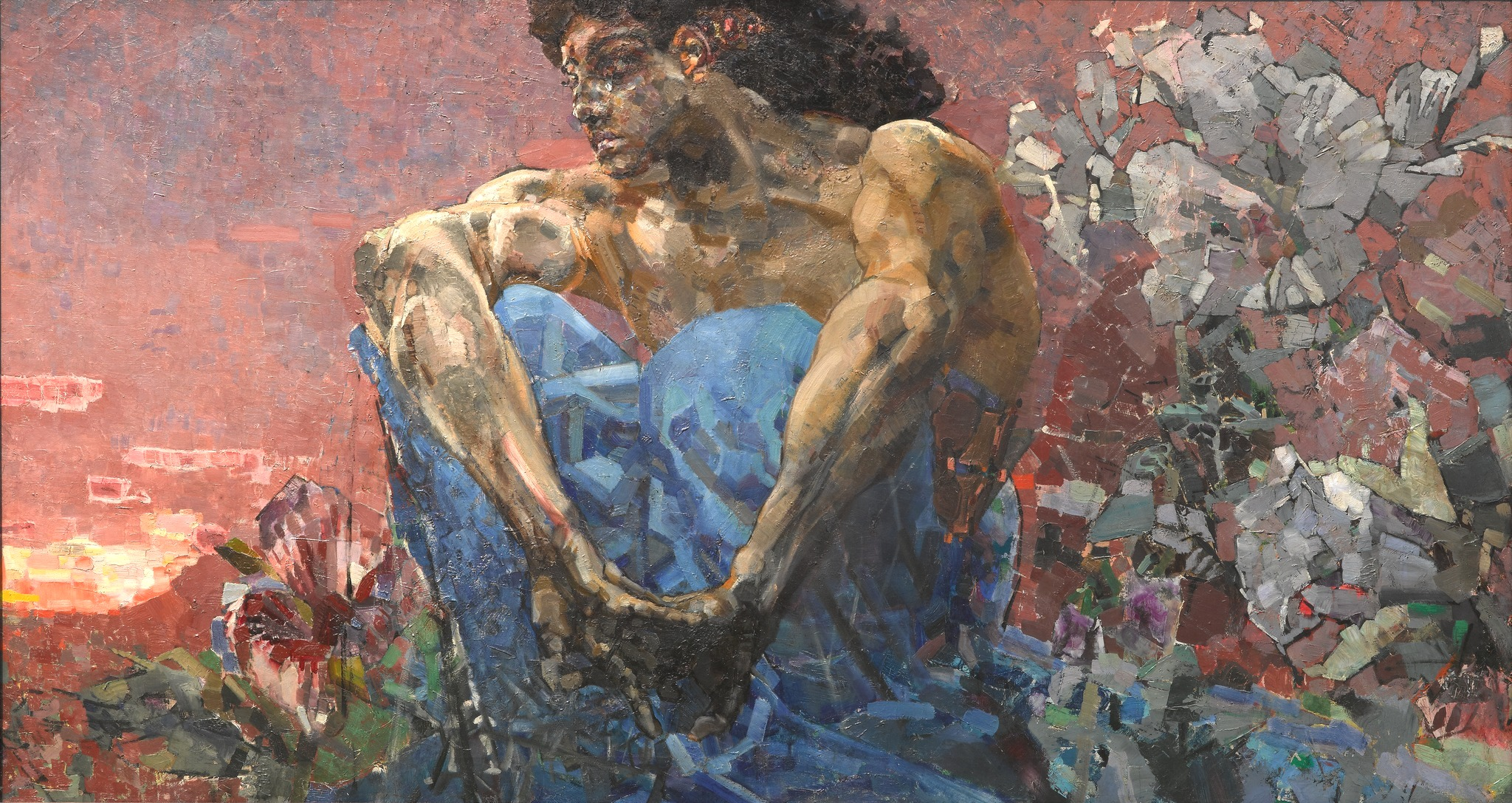
- Artist: Mikhail Vrubel
- Year: 1890
- Dimensions: 116.5 cm × 213.8 cm (45.9 in × 84.2 in)
- Location: Tretyakov Gallery, Moscow, Russia

The Demon Seated (Russian: Демон сидящий) is an 1890 symbolist piece by Russian artist Mikhail Vrubel.

The painting's background is a mountainous area in a scarlet sunset. The composition emphasizes the constraint of the demon's figure, as if pressed between the upper and lower bars of the frame. The painting is created in Vrubel's unique style with the effect of crystal edges, which makes his paintings look like stained glasses or panels. That effect was achieved with plain strokes made with a painting knife.

== History ==
In 1889, Vrubel moved to Moscow where he would produce The Demon Seated as his first large canvas. The work was harshly criticized, yet moved him into a higher realm of artistic expression. In this piece, among others, Vrubel explored the theme of a Demon from Mikhail Lermontov's 1839 poem, which tells of a Byronic demon that fell in love with a Georgian princess, who dies as a result of his kiss. Vrubel portrays the Demon as a romantic spirit, full of hope and searching for harmony and truth. He seems to briefly fulfill his longing, but suddenly has his hopes dashed. The Demon is disillusioned and pines for retribution. In the end, he is crushed and has no place in this world. Vrubel described this Demon as “a spirit uniting in itself masculine and feminine qualities…a spirit, not so much evil as suffering and sorrowing, but in all that a powerful spirit…a majestic spirit”.

Later, the painter created two more pieces on that theme: The Demon Flying (1899) and The Demon Downcast (1901–1902).
