= Vladimir Solovyov (philosopher) =

Russian philosopher and Christian mystic (1853–1900)

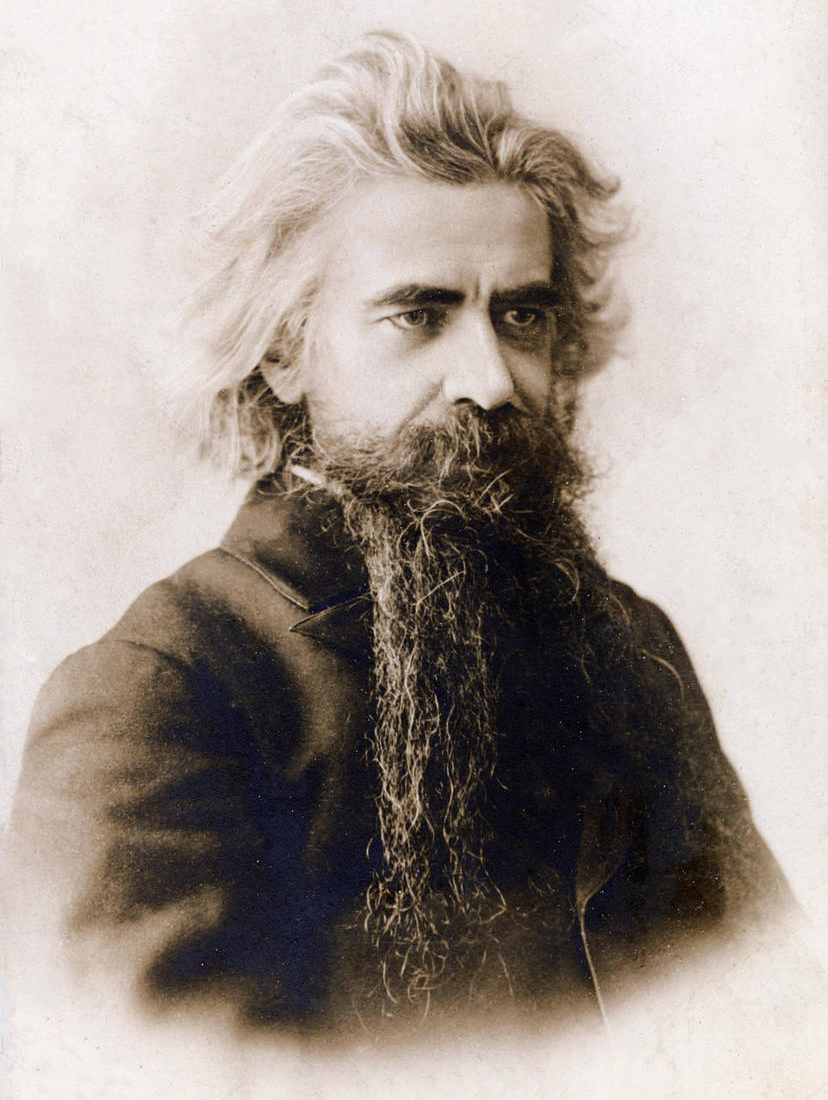
- Portrait of Vladimir Solovyov, c. 1900
- Born: Vladimir Sergeyevich Solovyov; 28 January 1853; Moscow, Russian Empire
- Died: 13 August 1900 (aged 47); Uzkoye, Moscow Governorate, Russian Empire

Education
- Education: Imperial Moscow University
- Thesis: Kritika otvlechennykh nachal (Critique of Abstract Principles) (1880)

Philosophical work
- Era: 19th-century philosophy
- Region: Russian philosophy
- School: Christian philosophy, Sophiology, Christian mysticism, Russian symbolism, Russian Schellingianism
- Institutions: Imperial Moscow University
- Main interests: Philosophy of religion
- Notable ideas: Sophiology, Christian universalism, proto-ecumenism

Vladimir Sergeyevich Solovyov (Note: The philosopher's family name has been spelt in various ways: Soloviev, Solov'ev Solovëv, Solowjew, Solov'jov, Solovieff, Solovioff and Solovyev. The most widely accepted transliterated form of his last name is Solovyov.) (Russian: Владимир Сергеевич Соловьёв; 28 January [O.S. 16 January] 1853 – 13 August [O.S. 31 July] 1900) was a Russian philosopher, theologian, poet, pamphleteer, and literary critic, who played a significant role in the development of Russian philosophy and poetry at the end of the 19th century and in the spiritual renaissance of the early 20th century.

== Life and work ==
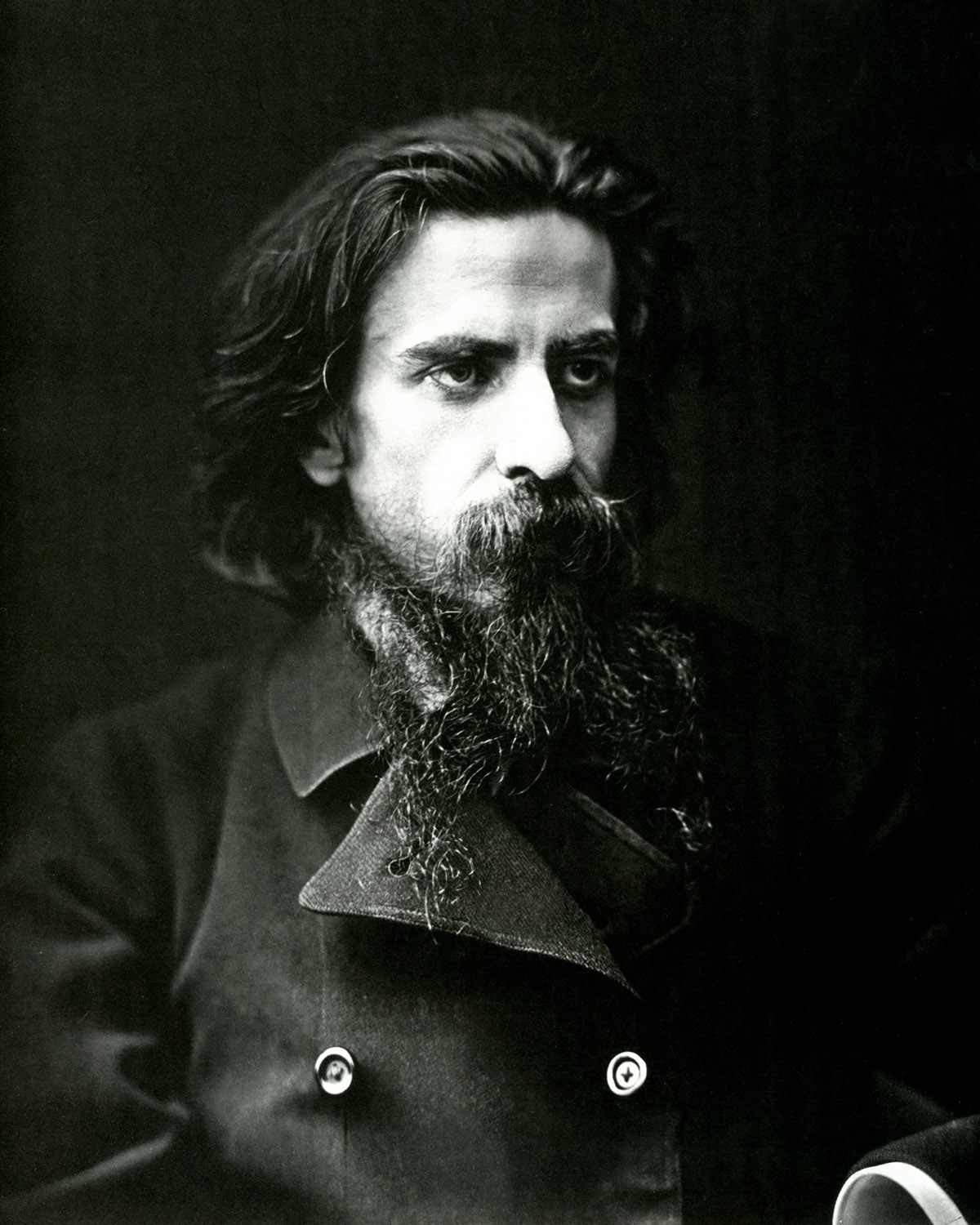
V. Solovyov in the 1880s

Vladimir Solovyov was born in Moscow; the second son of the historian Sergey Mikhaylovich Solovyov (1820–1879); his elder brother Vsevolod (1849–1903), became a historical novelist, and his younger sister, Polyxena (1867–1924), became a poet. Vladimir Solovyov's mother Polyxena Vladimirovna (née Romanova, d. 1909) belonged to a family of Polish and Ukrainian origin and among her ancestors was the philosopher Gregory Skovoroda (1722–1794).

In his teens, he renounced Eastern Orthodoxy for nihilism, but later his disapproval of positivism saw him begin to express some views that were in line with those of the Orthodox Church. From 1869 to 1873 Solovyov studied at the Imperial Moscow University, where his philosophy professor was Pamfil Yurkevich (1826–1874).

In his 1874 work The Crisis of Western Philosophy: Against the Positivists (Russian: Кризис западной философии (против позитивистов), Solovyov discredited the positivists' rejection of Aristotle's essentialism, or philosophical realism. In Against the Positivists he took the position of intuitive noetic comprehension, or insight. He saw consciousness as integral (see the Russian term sobornost) and requiring both phenomenon (validated by dianoia) and noumenon validated intuitively. Positivism, according to Solovyov, validates only the phenomenon of an object, denying the intuitive reality that people experience as part of their consciousness. As Solovyov's basic philosophy rests on the idea that the essence of an object (see essentialism) can be validated only by intuition and that consciousness as a single organic whole is done in part by reason or logic but in completeness by (non-dualist) intuition. Solovyov was partially attempting to reconcile the dualism (subject-object) found in German idealism.

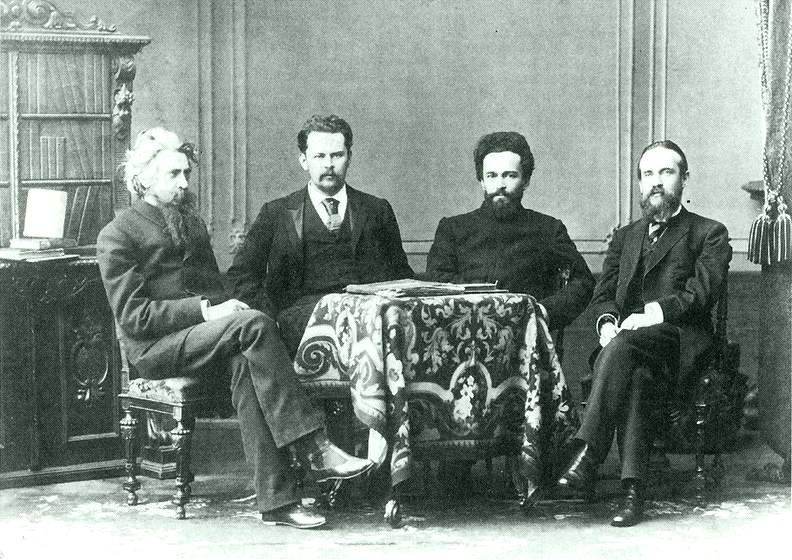
V. Soloviev, S. Trubetskoy, N. Grot, L. Lopatin, 1893

In 1877, Solovyov moved to Saint Petersburg, where he became a friend and confidant of the writer Fyodor Dostoyevsky (1821–1881). In opposition to his friend, Solovyov was sympathetic to the Catholic Church. He favoured the healing of the schism (ecumenism, sobornost) between the Orthodox and Catholic Churches. It is clear from Solovyov's work that he accepted papal primacy over the Universal Church. There is evidence that he converted to Catholicism in a ceremony on February 18, 1896. The testimony is signed by the Russian Greek Catholic priest Nikolay Tolstoy and two Catholic laypeople—Princess Olga Vasilievna Dolgorukova and Dmitry Sergeevich Novskiy. As an active member of Society for the Promotion of Culture Among the Jews of Russia, he spoke Hebrew and struggled to reconcile Judaism and Christianity. Politically, he became renowned as the leading defender of Jewish civil rights in tsarist Russia in the 1880s. Solovyov also advocated for his cause internationally and published a letter in The London Times pleading for international support for his struggle. The Jewish Encyclopedia describes him as "a friend of the Jews" and states that "Even on his death-bed he is said to have prayed for the Jewish people".

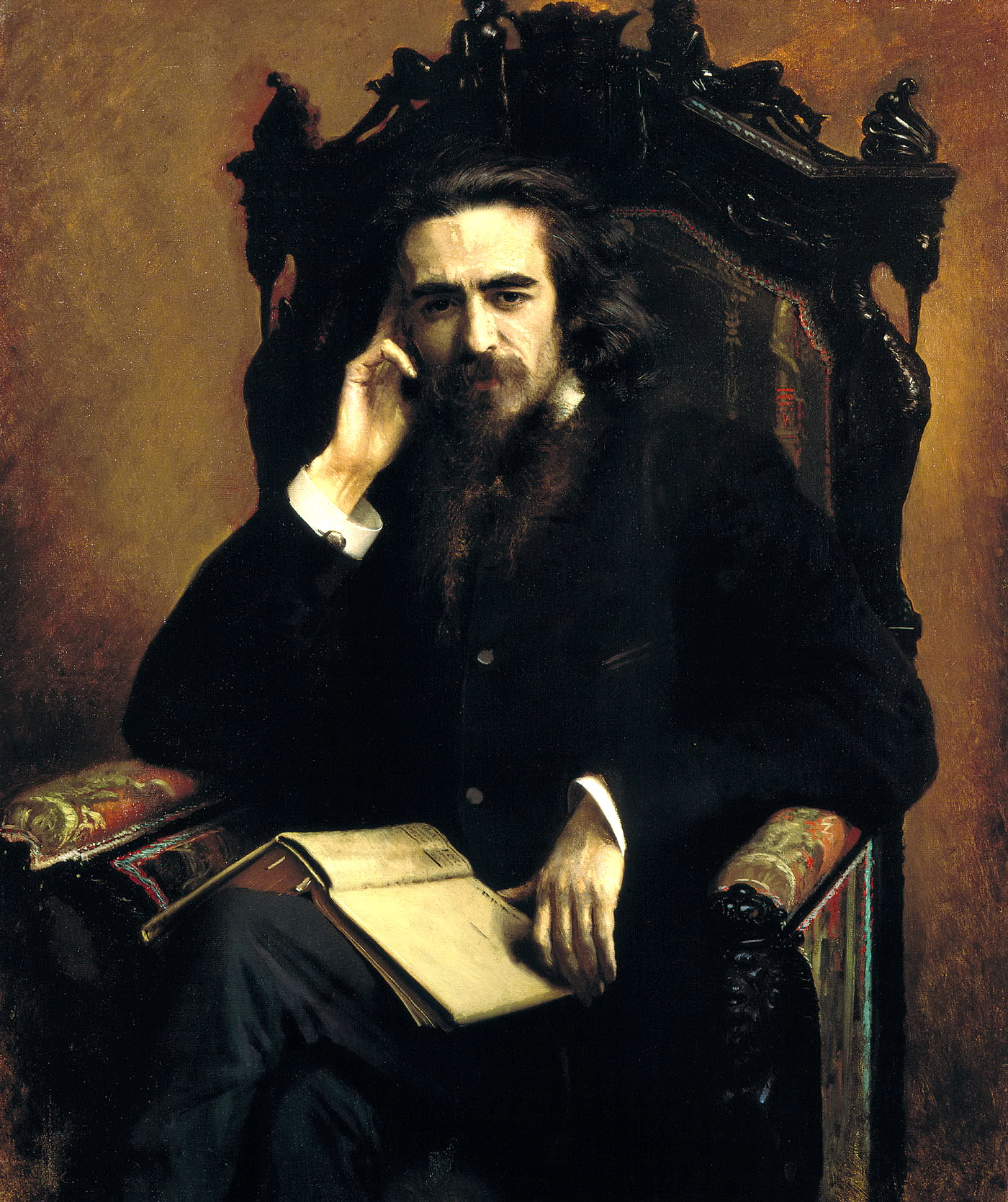
Portrait of Vladimir Solovyov by Ivan Kramskoy, 1885

Solovyov's attempts to chart a course of civilization's progress toward an East–West Christian ecumenism developed an increasing bias against Asian cultures—which he had initially studied with great interest. He dismissed the Buddhist concept of Nirvana as a pessimistic nihilistic "nothingness", antithetical to salvation and no better than Gnostic dualism. Solovyov spent his final years obsessed with fear of the "Yellow Peril", warning that soon the Asian peoples, especially the Chinese, would invade and destroy Russia.

Solovyov further elaborated this theme in his apocalyptic short-story "Tale of the Antichrist" (published in the Nedelya newspaper on 27 February 1900), in which China and Japan join forces to conquer Russia. His 1894 poem Pan-Mongolism, whose opening lines serve as epigraph to the story, was widely seen as predicting the coming Russo-Japanese War of 1904–1905.

Solovyov never married or had children, but he pursued idealized relationships as immortalized in his spiritual love-poetry, including with two women named Sophia. He rebuffed the advances of the Christian mystic Anna Nikolayevna Schmidt, who claimed to be his divine partner. In his later years, Solovyov became a vegetarian, but ate fish occasionally. He often lived alone for months without a servant and would work into the night.

== Influence ==
It is widely held that Solovyov was one of the sources for Dostoevsky's characters Alyosha Karamazov and Ivan Karamazov in The Brothers Karamazov. In Janko Lavrin's opinion, Solovyov has not left a single work which can be considered an epoch-making contribution to philosophy as such, and yet his writings have proved one of the most stimulating influences to the religious-philosophic thought of his country. Solovyov's influence can also be seen in the writings of the Symbolist and Neo-Idealist writers of the later Russian Soviet era. His book The Meaning of Love (book) can be seen as one of the philosophical sources of Leo Tolstoy's The Kreutzer Sonata (1889). It was also the work in which he introduced the concept of 'syzygy', to denote 'close union'.

== Sophiology ==
Solovyov synthesized a philosophy based on Hellenistic philosophy (see Plato, Aristotle and Plotinus) and early Christian tradition with Buddhist and Hebrew Kabbalistic elements (Philo of Alexandria). He also studied Gnosticism and the works of the Gnostic Valentinus. His religious philosophy was syncretic and fused philosophical elements of various religious traditions with Orthodox Christianity and his own experience of Sophia.

Solovyov described his encounters with the entity Sophia in his works, such as Three Encounters and Lectures on Godmanhood. His fusion was driven by the desire to reconcile and/or unite with Orthodox Christianity the various traditions by the Russian Slavophiles' concept of sobornost. His Russian religious philosophy had a very strong impact on the Russian Symbolist art and poetry movements of the Silver Age and his written arguments in favor of the reunion of the Russian Orthodox Church with the Holy See played an instrumental role in the formation of the Russian Greek Catholic Church. His teachings on Sophia, conceived as the merciful unifying feminine wisdom of God comparable to the Hebrew Shekinah or various goddess traditions, have been deemed a heresy by Russian Orthodox Church Outside Russia and as unsound and unorthodox by the Patriarchate of Moscow. This condemnation, however, was not agreed upon by other jurisdictions of the Orthodox church and was directed specifically against Sergius Bulgakov who continued to be defended by his own hierarch Metropolitan Evlogy until his death.

In his 2005 foreword to Solovyov's Justification of the Good, the Orthodox Christian theologian David Bentley Hart wrote a defense of Sophiology including a specific defense of Solovyov's later thought:

in Solovyov's developed reflections upon this figure (and in those of his successor Sophiologists', Pavel Florensky and Sergei Bulgakov), she was most definitely not an occult, or pagan, or Gnostic goddess, nor was she a fugitive from some Chaldean mystery cult, nor was she a speculative perversion of the Christian doctrine of God. She was not a fourth hypostasis in the Godhead, nor a fallen fragment of God, nor a literal world-soul, nor an eternal hypostasis who became incarnate as the Mother of God, nor most certainly the 'feminine aspect of deity.' Solovyov possessed too refined a mind to fall prey to the lure of cultic mythologies or childish anthropomorphisms, despite his interest in Gnosticism (or at least in its special pathos); and all such characterizations of the figure of Sophia are the result of misreadings (though, one must grant, misreadings partly occasioned by the young Solovyov's penchant for poetic hyperbole). In truth, the divine Sophia is first and foremost a biblical figure, and 'Sophiology' was born of an honest attempt to interpret intelligibly the role ascribed to her in the Wisdom literature of the Old Testament, in such a way as to complement the Logos Christology of the Fourth Gospel, while still not neglecting the 'autonomy' of creation within its very dependency upon the Logos.

== Sobornost ==
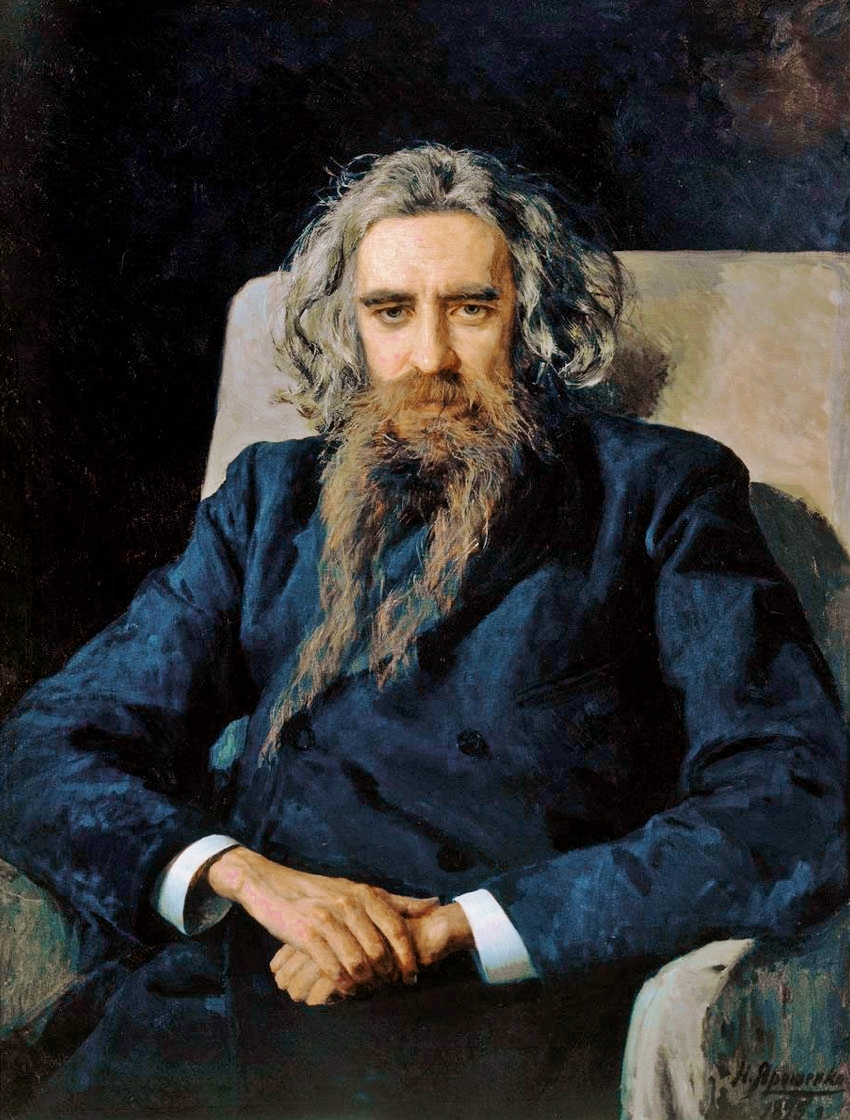
Vladimir Solovyov by Nikolai Yaroshenko, 1892

Solovyov sought to create a philosophy that could through his system of logic or reason reconcile all bodies of knowledge or disciplines of thought, and fuse all conflicting concepts into a single system. The central component of this complete philosophic reconciliation was the Russian Slavophile concept of sobornost (organic or spontaneous order through integration, which is related to the Russian word for 'catholic'). Solovyov sought to find and validate common ground, or where conflicts found common ground, and, by focusing on this common ground, to establish absolute unity and/or integral fusion of opposing ideas and/or peoples.

== Death ==
Intense mental work shattered Solovyov's health. He died at the Moscow estate of Petr Nikolaevitch Troubetzkoy, where the brother of the latter, Sergei Nikolaevich Trubetskoy, was living.

By 1900, Solovyov was apparently a homeless pauper. He left his brother, Mikhail Sergeevich, and several colleagues to defend and promote his intellectual legacy. He is buried at Novodevichy Convent.

== Quotes ==
But if the faith communicated by the Church to Christian humanity is a living faith, and if the grace of the sacraments is an effectual grace, the resultant union of the divine and the human cannot be limited to the special domain of religion, but must extend to all Man's common relationships and must regenerate and transform his social and political life.

== Works ==
Original Russian

- Мифологический процесс в древнем язычестве (1873)
- Кризис западной философии (против позитивистов) (1874)
- Кризис западной философии. По поводу «Философии бессознательного» Гартмана. (Статья первая) — Moscow: Ed. Orthodox Review, 1874.
- Теория Огюста Конта о трёх фазисах в умственном развитии человечества
- О философских трудах П. Д. Юркевича (1874)
- Метафизика и положительная наука (1875)
- Странное недоразумение (ответ г. Лесевичу) (1874)
- О действительности внешнего мира и основании метафизического познания (ответ Кавелину)
- Три силы (1877)
- Опыт синтетической философии
- Философские начала цельного знания (1877)
- Чтения о богочеловечестве (1878)
- Критика отвлечённых начал (1880)
- Историческия дела философии (1880)
- Три речи в память Достоевского (1881—1883)
- Заметка в защиту Достоевского от обвинения в «новом» христианстве
- О духовной власти в России (1881)
- О расколе в русском народе и обществе (1882–188З)
- На пути к истинной философии (1883)
- Некролог. Кн. К. М. Шаховская (1883)
- Духовные основы жизни (1882—1884)
- Содержание речи, произнесённой на высших женских курсах в Петербурге 13 марта 1881 года
- Великий спор и христианская политика. (1883)
- Соглашение с Римом и московские газеты. (1883)
- О церковном вопросе по поводу старокатоликов. (1883)
- Еврейство и христианский вопрос. (1884)
- Взгляд первого славянофила на церковный раздор. (1884)
- Любовь к народу и русский народный идеал (открытое письмо к И. С. Аксакову) 1884
- Ответ Н. Я. Данилевскому. (1885)
- Как пробудить наши церковные силы?·(открытое письмо к С. А. Рачинскому). (1885)
- Новозаветный Израиль (1885)
- Государственная философия по программе Министерства Народного Просвещения. 1885
- Учение XII апостолов. (Введение к русскому изданию Διδαχή τῶν δώδεκα ἀποστόλων.) (1886)
- История и будущностъ теократии (исследование всемирно-исторического пути к истинной жизни). (1885—1887)
- Ответ анонимному критику по вопросу о догматическом развитии в церкви. (1886)
- Русская идея [translated from Fr. G. A. Rachinsky]. — Moscow, 1911.
- Россия и Вселенская церковь (1889)
- Красота в природе (1889)
- Общий смысл искусства (1890)
- Г. Ярош и истина (1890)
- Китай и Европа (1890)
- Иллюзия поэтического творчества (1890)
- Мнимая борьба с западом 1890
- Об упадке средневекового миросозерцания (1891)
- Идолы и идеалы (1891)
- Из философии истории (1891)
- Запоздалая вылазка из одного литературного лагеря. (Письмо в редакцию.) (1891)
- Народная беда и общественная помощь. (1891)
- Наши грехи и наша обязанность. (1891)
- Враг с Востока (1892)
- Заметка о Е. П. Блавацкой (1892)
- Кто прозрел? (Письмо в редакцию «Русской мысли»). (1892)
- Мнимые и действительные меры к подъёму народного благосостояния. (1892)
- Вопрос о самочинном умствовании Л. Тихомирова, Духовенство и общество в современном религиозном движении (1893)
- Из вопросов культуры (1893): I. Ю. Ф. Самарин в письме к баронессе Э. Ф. Раден
- Из вопросов культуры (1893): II. Исторический сфинкс.
- Смысл любви (1894)
- Некролог. А. М. Иванцов-Платонов (1894)
- Некролог. Ф. М. Дмитриев (1894)
- Некролог. Франциск Рачкий (1894)
- Византизм и Россия (1896)
- Магомет, его жизнь и религиозное учение. — tip. of the "Public Benefit" company, 1896. – 80 с. – (Life of Remarkable People. Biographical Library of Florentiy Pavlenkov)
- Когда жили еврейские пророки? (1896)
- Мир Востока и Запада (1896)
- Духовные основы жизни. — СПб., 1897.
- Замечание на статью проф. Г. Ф. Шершеневича (1897)
- Из Московской губернии. Письмо в редакцию «Вестника Европы» (1897)
- Импрессионизм мысли (1897)
- Мнимая критика (ответ В. Н. Чичерину) (1897)
- Жизненная драма Платона (1898)
- Мицкевич (1898)
- Оправдание добра (1897, 1899)
- Тайна прогресса (1898)
- Идея человечества у Августа Конта (1898)
- Некролог. Я. П. Полонский (1898)
- Значение поэзии в стихотворениях Пушкина (1899)
- Идея сверхчеловека (1899)
- Лермонтов (1899)
- Некролог. В. Г. Васильевский (1899)
- Некролог. И. Д. Рабинович (1899)
- Некролог. Л. И. Поливанов (1899)
- Некролог. М. С. Корелин (1899)
- Некролог. Н. Я. Грот (1899)
- Три разговора о войне, прогрессе и конце всемирной истории (1900)
- Некролог. В. В. Болотов (1900)
- Некролог. В. П. Преображенский (1900)
- Последняя лекция Владимира Сергеевича Соловьёва в С.-Петербургском университете в 1882 г. : (Лекция 25 февр.). — St. Petersburg: Printing house of M. Alisov and A. Grigoriev, [1882].

English translations

- The Heart of Reality: Essays on Beauty, Love, and Ethics. University of Notre Dame Press, 2020. ISBN 978-0268108939
- The Burning Bush: Writings on Jews and Judaism, Compiled 2016 by Lindisfarne Books, ISBN 0-940262-73-8 ISBN 978-0-940262-73-7
- The Crisis of Western Philosophy: Against the Positivists, 1874. Reprinted 1996 by Lindisfarne Books, ISBN 0-940262-73-8 ISBN 978-0-940262-73-7
- The Philosophical Principles of Integral Knowledge (1877)
- The Critique of Abstract Principles (1877–80)
- Lectures on Divine Humanity (1877–91)
- The Russian Idea, 1888. Translation published in 2015 by CreateSpace Independent Publishing Platform, ISBN 1508510075 ISBN 978-1508510079
- A Story of Anti-Christ (novel), 1900. Reprinted 2012 by Kassock Bros. Publishing Co., ISBN 1475136838 ISBN 978-1475136838
- The Justification of the Good, 1918. Reprinted 2010 by Cosimo Classics, ISBN 1-61640-281-4 ISBN 978-1-61640-281-5
- The Meaning of Love. Reprinted 1985 by Lindisfarne Books, ISBN 0-89281-068-8 ISBN 978-0-89281-068-0
- War, Progress, and the End of History: Three Conversations, Including a Short Story of the Anti-Christ, 1915. Reprinted 1990 by Lindisfarne Books, ISBN 0-940262-35-5 ISBN 978-0-940262-35-5
- Russia and the Universal Church. Reprinted 1948 by G. Bles. (Abridged version: The Russian Church and the Papacy, 2002, Catholic Answers, ISBN 1-888992-29-8 ISBN 978-1-888992-29-8)
- Vladimir Solovyev; translated from the Russian by Richard Gill with an introduction by Janko Lavrin and a concluding chapter by Judith Kornblatt (2004). Transformations of Eros: An Odyssey from Platonic to Christian Eros (Жизненная драма Платона). Grailstone Press. ISBN 1-59650-001-8. 103 pages

== See also ==
- Apophatic theology
- Mikhail Epstein
- Leo Mikhailovich Lopatin
- Vladimir Lossky
- Phronesis
