= Pamfil Yurkevich =

Ukrainian philosopher and teacher (1826–1874)

- Памфил Данилович Юркевич
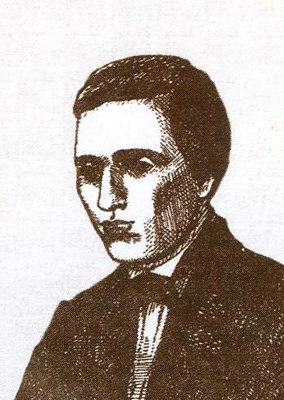
- Born: Pamfil Danilovich Yurkevich; February 28, 1826; Poltava, Russian Empire
- Died: October 16, 1874 (aged 48); Moscow, Russian Empire
- Occupations: Philosopher, teacher

Pamfil Danilovich Yurkevich (Russian: Памфил Данилович Юркевич; 28 February 1826 – 16 October 1874) was a Ukrainian philosopher and teacher of philosophy at the Imperial University of Moscow.

From 1851 to 1861, Yurkevich was a professor of philosophy at the Kyiv Theological Academy, also taught at the Academy of the German language, was an assistant inspector of the Academy. In 1861, he was transferred from Kyiv (now Kyiv, Ukraine) to Moscow and was appointed a professor of philosophy at the University of Moscow though his training previous to this position was mostly from Orthodox theological schools. Specifically the Poltava Seminary and the Kyiv Theological Academy. Yurkevich was remembered for his critical stance against materialism in specific modern materialism. Yurkevich mentored Vladimir Soloviev.

== Career ==
In 1851, Yurkevich appointed the position of instructor in Philosophical Sciences at the Kyiv Theological Academy. In 1852, he received his master's degree in philosophy (from 1861 — professor). In 1857, Yurkevich also began to teach German at the University. Based on the decision of the Ministry of Education in 1861 Yurkevich was transferred from Kyiv to Moscow and received the rank of full Professor and was invited to the philosophy department at Moscow University. Yurkevich also taught pedagogy in the seminary for the Russian military. Through 1869—1873 Yurkevich was the Dean of History and Philology Faculty of the Moscow University.

== Views ==
Yurkevich's more well known positions and the works that reflected them (The Heart and Its Significance in the Spiritual Life of Man) revolved around the expression and rationalization of essentialism. In this Yurkevich concerned himself with the philosophical clarification of what material and the observable world are. Though Yurkevich was an idealist in the sense of Platonic Realism, he was thoroughly Christian in his approach rejecting that the mind of a person as reason was the basis for the essences of things or beings and instead saying that essentialism was idealist (from conscious beings inline with Plato) but it was from the rational part of the being (their mind) and also from the emotional center and that the heart of the person was the complete expression of the person. Person or soul (hypostasis) is heart, mind and body, as the rational part of a person was but a part of the larger whole which as a heart or soul each person gave meaning to the things they experienced. Yurkevich was continuing the work that had been set out before him by his famous mentor Vladimir Soloviev. Idealist criticism Yurkevich work by Chernyshevsky, "The Anthropological Principle in Philosophy", marked the beginning of a stormy debate (statements by Chernyshevsky, M. A. Antonovich, etc.), which had wide public resonance. From the Marxist standpoint Yurkevich criticized Plekhanov. Themes work Yurkevich largely determined responsive the subsequent development of philosophical idealism.

== See also ==
- Dmytro Chyzhevsky
- Nikolay Lossky
