= Lev Lopatin =

Russian philosopher

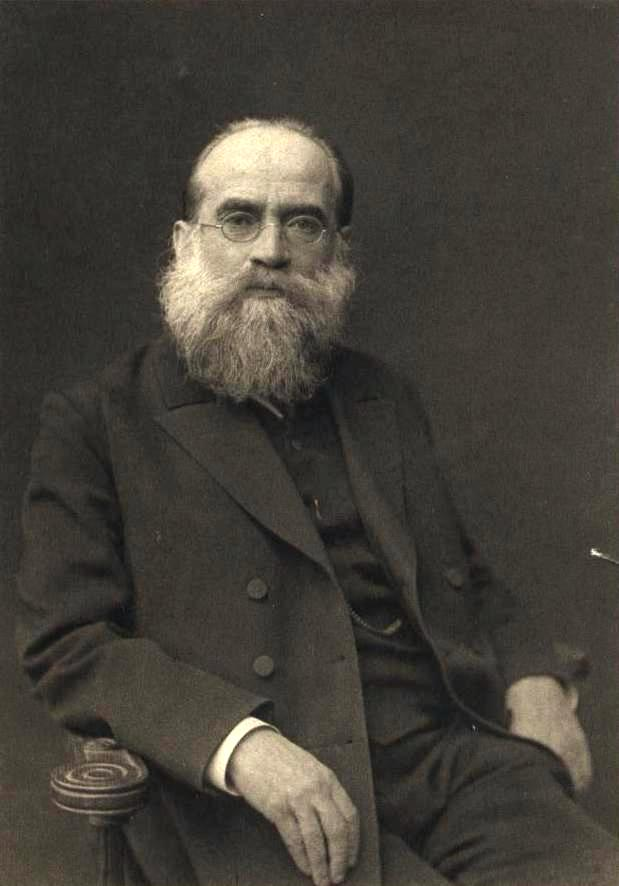
L. M. Lopatin

Lev (Leo) Mikhailovich Lopatin (Russian: Лев Миха́йлович Лопа́тин; 13 June 1855, Moscow – 21 March 1920, Moscow) was a Russian philosopher and former head of the Moscow Psychological Society until the formal liquidation of the society by the Soviet after the Revolution of 1917. Lopatin fell victim to the policies of Soviet reform, which caused widespread famine, and in 1920 he died due to malnourishment and exhaustion.

== Works ==
Lopatin was a close personal acquaintance of Vladimir Soloviev, and he identified strongly with Soloviev's ideas. Lopatin is known to have been an ardent support and proponent of Soloviev's philosophy. Lopatin article on Soloviev's philosophy in the Russian journal Mind, issue 25, 1916, outlines Lopatin's validation of Soloviev and also Lopatin's points of departure and areas of disagreement.

Lopatin continued to clarify his philosophy in his two-volume work The Positive Tasks of Philosophy (1886). Lopatin created a great body of work dedicated to the subject of free will (metaphysical libertarianism), which was not published.

Lopatin's Philosophical Idealism was criticized and refuted by Lenin in his Materialism and Empirio-criticism.

== See also ==
- Russian Philosophy
- N. O. Lossky

== Sources ==
- A history of Russian Philosophy (2 vols.), by Vasilii Vasilevich Zenkovsky; Translator George L. Kline Publisher: ROUTLEDGE & KEGAN PAUL (1953), ASIN: B000R0I5MS
