= Anna Schmidt =

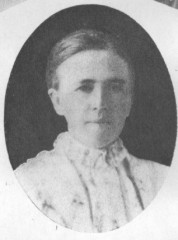
- Born: August 11, 1851; Nizhny Novgorod, Russian Empire
- Died: August 18, 1905 (aged 54); Moscow, Russian Empire
- Occupations: Writer, journalist, philosopher

Philosophical work
- Main interests: Religion
- Notable works: The Third Testament

Anna Nikolaevna Schmidt (August 11, 1851 [O.S. July 30] – August 18, 1905) was a Russian journalist and author of religious and mystical works, including The Third Testament.

== Biography ==
Schmidt was born on August 11 (O.S. July 30), 1851 in Nizhny Novgorod, where she spent most of her life. Her father was a lawyer and served as a forensic investigator. Her mother was a religious woman who honored Orthodox traditions, née A.F. Romanova, the daughter of a titular councilor. Schmidt was the only daughter in the family and was raised in the Old Testament spirit. She did not receive a systematic education, but she passed the exam to become a French teacher and taught at the Mariinsky Women's Gymnasium for three years. Subsequently, she worked as a translator and journalist in local newspapers.

Without sufficient education, from a personal mystical revelation, like visionary authors (for example, Jakob Böhme), she built a Gnostic system. Her writings were highly appreciated by the Russian philosopher Sergei Bulgakov, who noted the closeness between her teachings and Kabbalah.

Later, she met with him. Anna Schmidt corresponded with Alexander Blok. Andrei Bely and Sergei Solovyov wrote about her, and Nikolai Berdyaev held her in high esteem. In 1900, Schmidt wrote a 16-page letter to Vladimir Solovyov, detailing her teachings, which she considered divine revelations. In her works, Anna Schmidt addressed the concept of the Third Testament.

In the Third Testament, Schmidt described an unorthodox conception of the Trinity, in which it consists of a Father, Son, and Daughter. Schmidt also states that spirits can beget spiritual children. Schmidt additionally made references in her work to the idea that Solovyov was a reincarnation of the Logos.

She died on August 18, 1905, in Moscow. She was buried in the Peter and Paul Cemetery of Nizhny Novgorod (the burial was not preserved).

== Bibliography ==
- Schmidt A. N. The Third Testament. English translation, Daniel H. Shubin, 2018. ISBN 9781365557972
- Shmidt A. N. From the manuscripts of Anna Nikolaevna Shmidt with letters to her from Vladimir Solovyov.- M., 1916
