= Painting knife =

Artist's tool with flexible blade

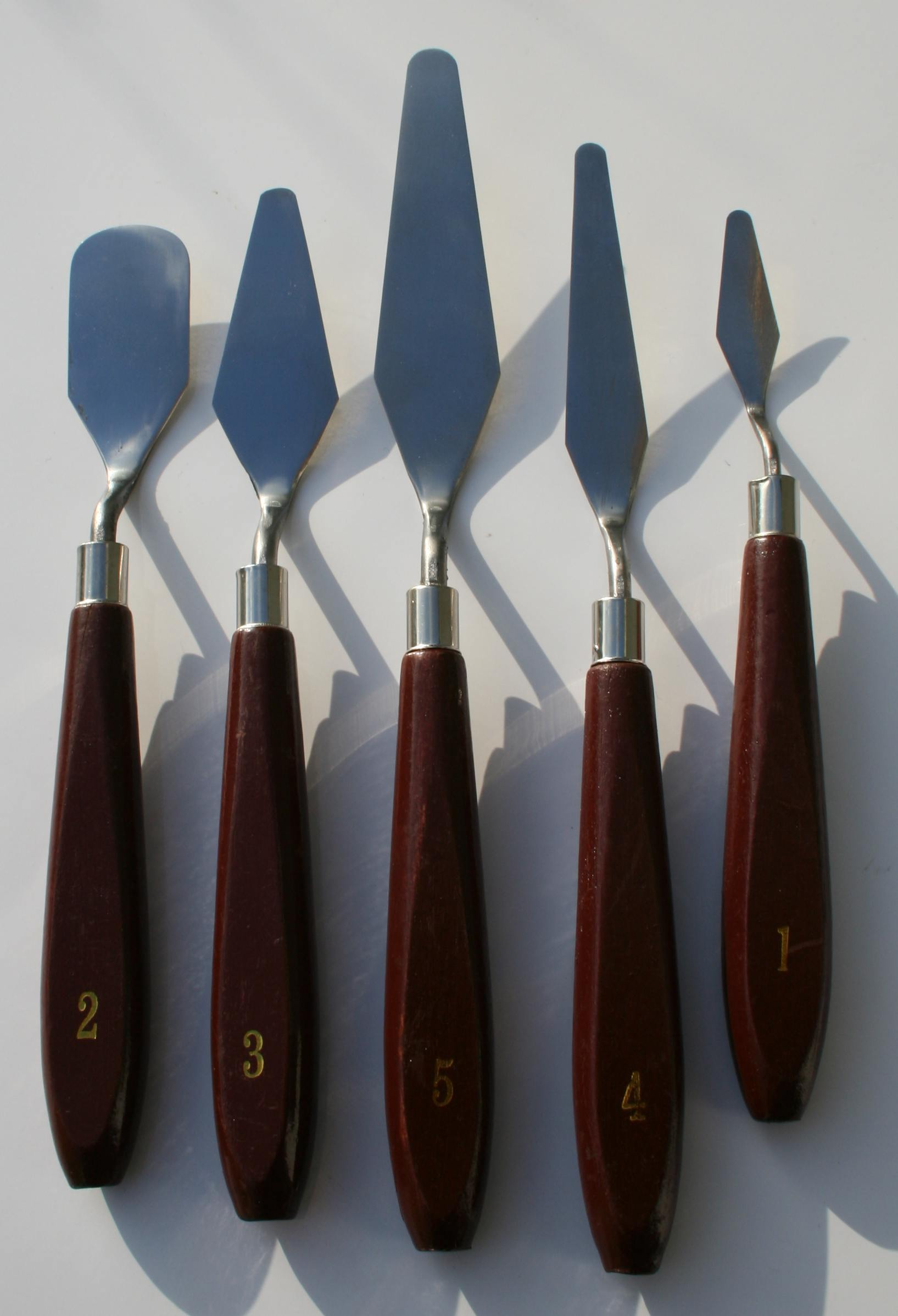
Painting knives

A painting knife is an artist's tool with a flexible steel blade used to apply and manipulate paint directly on the canvas. They are manufactured in a variety of styles and sizes. Blades can be long and thin, triangular, rectangular or diamond shaped. Handles are either straight or offset like a trowel.

A painting knife differs from a palette knife which is used for mixing paint on a pallet, sheet of glass or slab. Their slender and limber blades usually have either a tapered or rounded tip. Tangs are straight or angled to keep fingers from touching the paint.

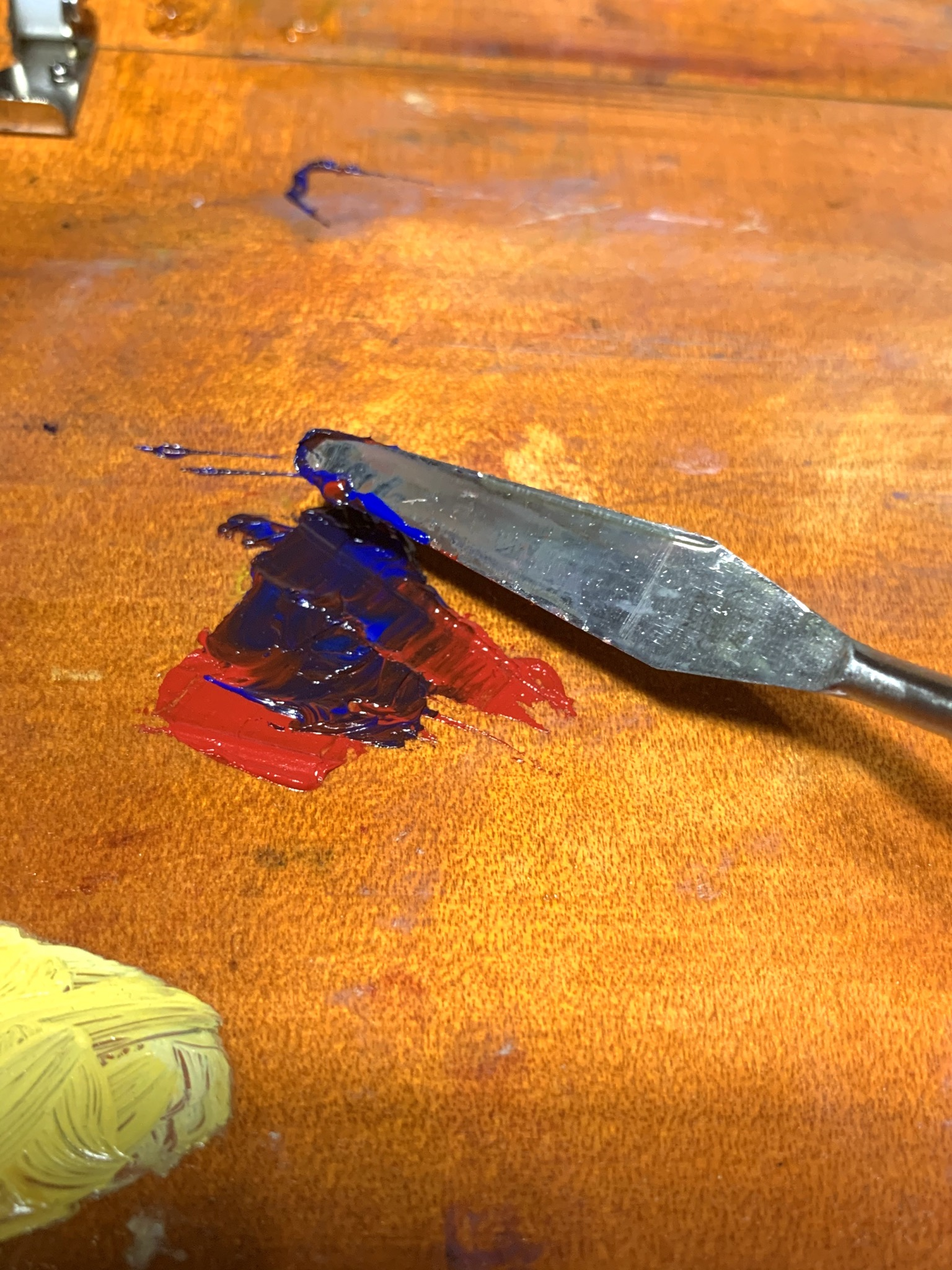
Mixing paints on the palette

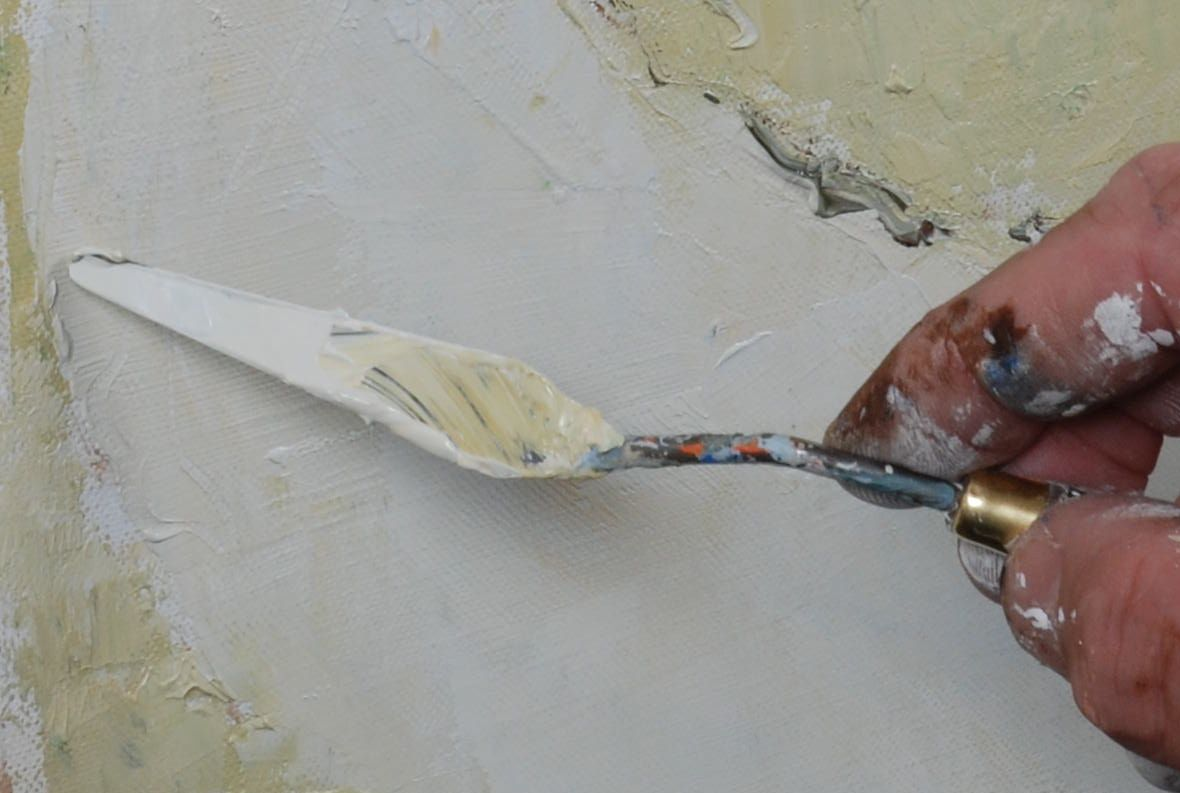
Painting knife

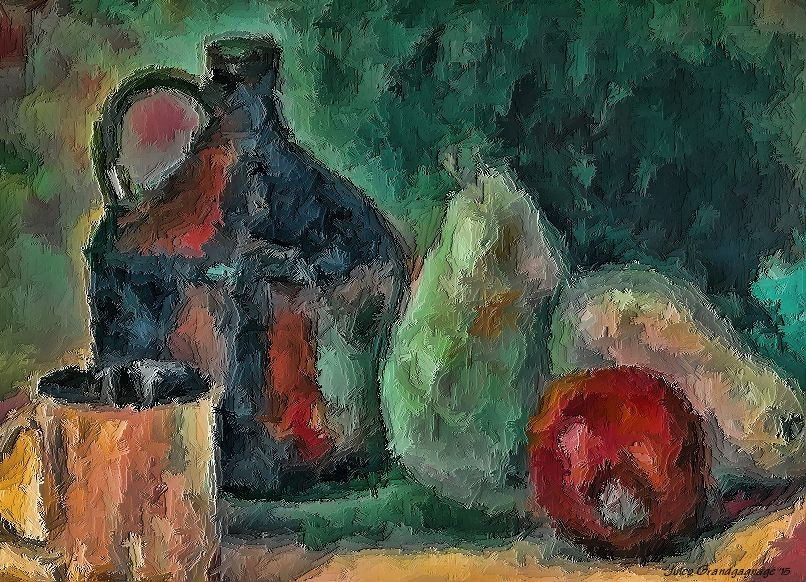
Still life painted with painting knife

== Knife painters ==
Famous knife painters are: Titian, John Constable, Bill Alexander, Bob Ross, Frans Hals, Rembrandt, Fragonard, Courbet, Nicolas de Staël, Marcelle Ferron, and Jean-Paul Riopelle.

== See also ==
- Palette (painting)
