= Ivanov-Razumnik =

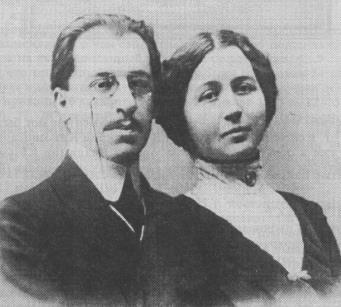
- Ivanov-Razumnik with his wife Varvara Ivanova
- Born: 24 December 1878; Tiflis, Russian Empire
- Died: 9 July 1946 (aged 67); Munich, American occupation zone in Germany
- Education: Saint Petersburg State University
- Occupations: writer sociologist literary critic
- Writing career
- Period: 1904–1946
- Genres: critical essay sociology

Razumnik Vasilyevich Ivanov (Note: Russian: Разу́мник Васи́льевич Ива́нов) (24 December 1878 – 9 July 1946), known as Ivanov-Razumnik, was a Russian writer, philosopher and literary critic, best known for his book History of Russian Social Thought (1907, in two volumes) and the series of essays on post-Revolution literary life in the Soviet Russia.

== Biography ==
Razumnik Vasilyevich Ivanov was born in Tiflis, Georgia to a family of impoverished Russian nobleman. After graduating the 1st Saint Petersburg gymnasium he joined the faculty of Mathematics at Saint Petersburg University. In 1901 for taking part in the students' unrest he was arrested, expelled and a year later deported from the capital to Simferopol.

Ivanov-Razumnik's first article (on Nikolay Mikhaylovsky) was published in Russkaya Mysl in 1904. His History of Russian Social Thought in two volumes came out in 1907 and became popular with the Russian left. In 1912 Ivanov-Razumnik joined the staff of Narodnik magazine Zavety (Testaments) where he became the head of a literary department and friends with Sergey Mstislavsky, Victor Chernov and several other authors, members of the Socialist Revolutionary party.

In 1916 Ivanov-Razumnik became the leader of a literary group (including, among others, Andrey Bely, Alexander Blok, Sergey Yesenin, Nikolay Klyuev and Olga Forsh) which later became known as Skify (Scythians), after the eponymous anthology which came out in 1917. For the second Skify book which came out in 1918 Ivanov-Razumnik wrote a programme-setting article called "The Two Russias".

Ivanov-Razumnik accepted the October 1917 revolution wholeheartedly, in fact, he took part in the coup and was in the Smolny from 26th to 28 October. As the SR party broken into two, he continued to actively cooperate with its left flank, for which he was arrested by Cheka in February 1919, but released on instructions from Felix Dzerhinsky. He was the literary section editor of Znamya Truda (Flag of Labour), which belonged to the Left Socialist Revolutionary Party (PLSR), and literary section chief of Nash Put (Our Way), and made it sure that Andrey Bely, Alexander Blok and Sergey Yesenin were published there regularly.

In 1919–1925 he was among the leaders (a vice-chairman) of the Free Philosophical Association, bound to "investigate philosophical aspects of culture and creativity in the Socialist society." In 1933, he was accused of propagating the narodnik ideas, arrested and deported to Siberia for three years, living in poverty and without proper work. He was arrested and exiled again in September 1937, but released in 1939. After his release he obtained work in the State Museum of Literature in Pushkin, near Leningrad (St Petersburg) and was there when the town was overrun by the German army, in September 1941. The following month, he was sent to a camp in Eastern Prussia where he stayed up until the summer of 1943. After the liberation he moved first to Lithuania, then back to Germany where he settled to write about his life in the Soviet Union (Life in Prisons and Exile) and published essays on Soviet authors (The Writers' Fates). On 9 July 1946 Ivanov-Razumnik died in Munich, Germany.

== Ideas ==
Ivanov-Razumnik developed his own system of literary analysis, dividing the history of modern Russian literature into several periods marked by ideological paradigms: the "mystical theory of progress" (1820–1830), then the "positive theory of progress" (1840s), "immanent subjectivism" (Hertzen, 1850s), "vulgar immanent subjectivism" (utilitarianism, nihilism, 1860s), "immanent subjectivism" again (Lavrov and Mikhaylovsky, narodniks; 1870s), the revived "positive theory of progress" (Russian Marxism, 1890s), the return of "mystical theory of progress" (1900s) and again return to "immanent subjectivism" (1910s onwards).

According to Ivanov-Razumnik, immanent subjectivism (which he saw himself as belonging to) "rejected the objective expediency, objective meaning of life and gives priority to the subjective systems of reasonability, declaring man as the one subjective goal of development." For meaning of life it holds achieving "the fullness of being", comprising so called 'elements of reality': 'reality of senses', 'reality of beauty', 'reality of justice' and 'reality of truth').

Warning against the misinterpretation of the term, Ivanov-Razumnik wrote in The History of Russian Social Thinking: "The Subjectivism is neither a method nor a means to an end, it is a kind of sociological mindset, in fact, not only sociological, but epistemological, psychological and ethical. Subjectivism might be defined as the ethical and sociological individualism." "The immanent subjectivism amounts to a vigorous, active mindset charged with vitality and giving to both an individual and humanity as a whole a new, subjectively-orientated meaning of life," he stated in another work, "Of the Life’s Meaning" (1910).
