= Palette (painting) =

Flat surface for mixing paints

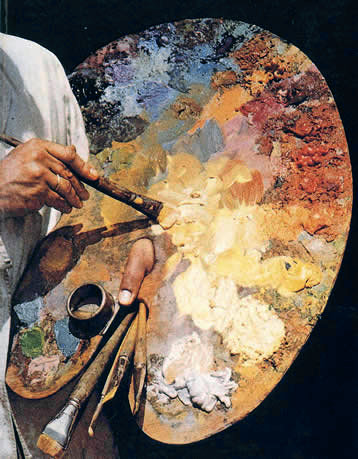
An artist's palette

A palette (/ˈpælɪt/) is a surface on which a painter arranges and mixes paints. A palette is made of materials such as wood, paper, glass, ceramic or plastic, and can vary greatly in size and shape. Watercolor palettes are generally made of plastic or porcelain in a rectangular or wheel format, and have built in wells and mixing areas for colors. For acrylic painting, "stay wet" palettes exist, which prevent the paints from drying out and becoming inert.

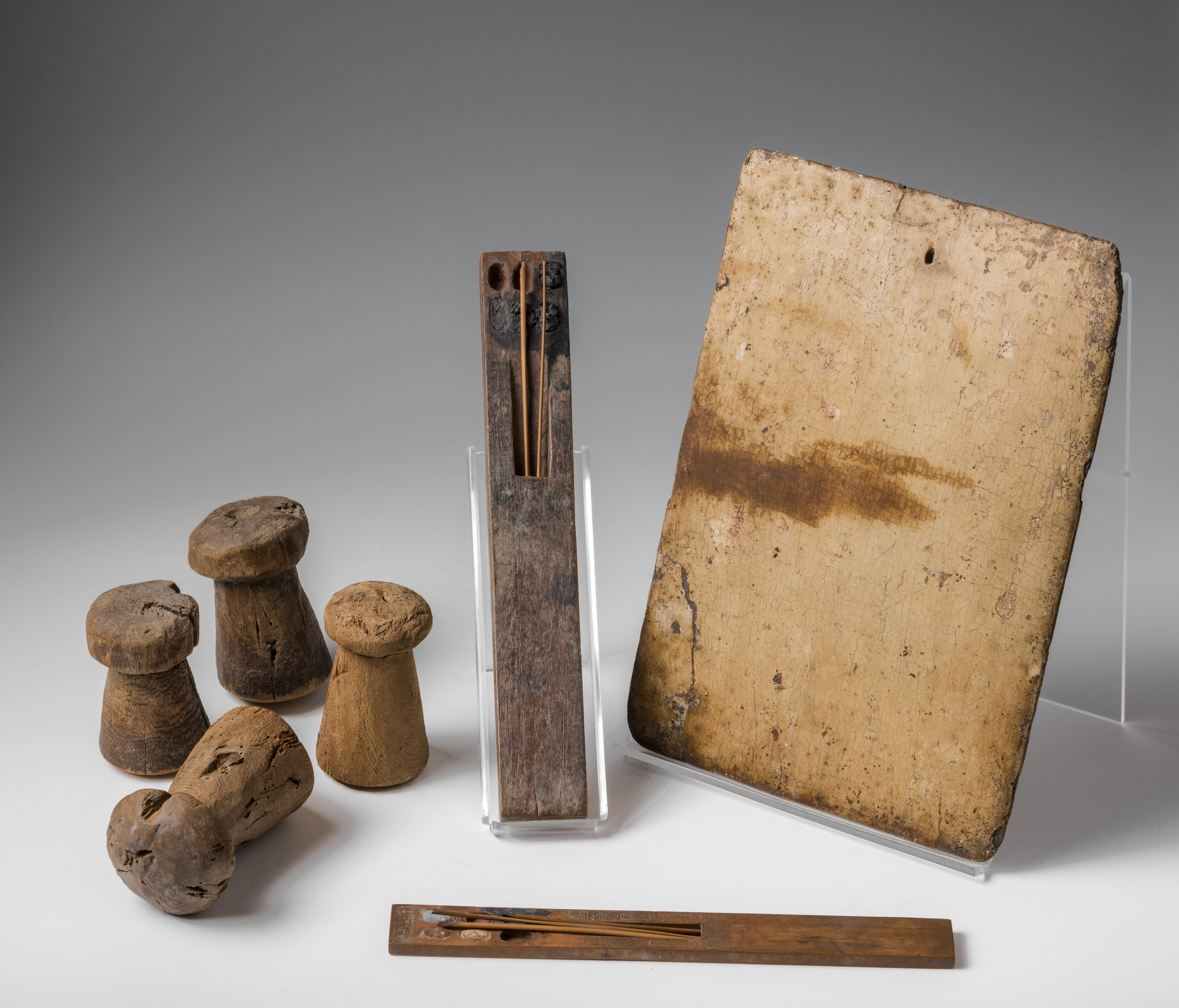
Scribe's palette with styluses and residues of colors, from the Tomb of Kha and Merit. Between 1425 and 1353 BC (New Kingdom of Egypt). Museo Egizio, Turin.

A classical palette is most often oval, but can also be rectangular, and is tapered to ensure optimal distribution of weight. It has a thumbhole and insert for brushes, and is designed to be held in the non-dominant hand while the other is used to mix and paint. However, some well-known artists have used more unconventional palettes; for instance, Picasso used a sheet of newspaper.

Palettes are also a universal symbol of painting and art in general, alongside paintbrushes, for example in the symbol of Microsoft Paint.

== See also ==
- Color scheme
- Palette (computing)
- Palette knife
