= List of writers by name: T =

The following is a List of writers by name whose last names begin with T:

Abbreviations: ch = children's; d = drama, screenwriting; f = fiction; nf = non-fiction; p = poetry, song lyrics

== Ta ==
- Alia Tabaï (born 1961, Tunisia, f)
- Alfred Taban (1957–2019, Sudan, nf)
- Taban Lo Liyong (born 1939, Sudan/S Sudan, p/f/nf)
- Abdelkarim Tabbal (born 1931, Morocco, p)
- Gladys Taber (1899–1980, US, f/nf)
- Galaktion Tabidze (1892–1959, Russian E/USSR, p)
- Titsian Tabidze (1890–1937, Russian E/USSR, p)
- George Tabori (1914–2007, Hungary/Germany, f/d)
- Ahmat Taboye (living, Chad, nf)
- Antonio Tabucchi (1943–2012, Italy, f/nf)
- Masaaki Tachihara (立原正秋, 1926–1980, Japan, f/nf/p)
- Michizō Tachihara (立原道造, 1914–1939, Japan, p)
- Chimako Tada (多田智満子, 1930–2003, Japan, p)
- Ljubomir Tadić (1925–2013, Yugoslavia/Serbia, nf)
- Novica Tadić (1949–2011, Yugoslavia/Serbia, p)
- Véronique Tadjo (born 1955, France/Ivory Coast, nf/p/f)
- Rabindranath Tagore (1861–1941, India, p/nf)
- Taguchi Ukichi (田口卯吉, 1855–1905, Japan, nf)
- Valerie Tagwira (living, S Rhodesia/Zimbabwe, f/p)
- Mahmoud Mohammed Taha (1909–1985, Sudan, nf)
- Miral al-Tahawy (born 1968, Egypt, f)
- Bahaa Taher (1935–2022, Egypt, f)
- Ibn Tahir of Caesarea (c. 1057–1113, Jerusalem, nf)
- Kemal Tahir (1910–1973, Ottoman E/Turkey, f)
- Muhammad Tahir-ul-Qadri (born 1951, Pakistan/Canada, nf)
- Abdellah Taïa (born 1973, Morocco/France, f)
- Paco Ignacio Taibo II (born 1949, Spain/Mexico, f)
- Jean de La Taille (c. 1540 – c. 1607, France, p/d)
- Taillefer (died 1066, France/England, p)
- John Taine (1883–1960, Scotland/US, nf/f), pseudonym of Eric Temple Bell
- Judit Dukai Takách (1795–1836, Hungary, p)
- Bogi Takács (born 1983, Hungary/US, p/nf)
- Akimitsu Takagi (高木彬光, 1920–1995, Japan, f)
- Kyoshi Takahama (高浜虚子, 1874–1959, Japan, p)
- Genichiro Takahashi (高橋源一郎, born 1951, Japan, f)
- Kazumi Takahashi (高橋和巳, 1931–1971, Japan, f/nf)
- Motokichi Takahashi (高橋元吉, 1893–1965, Japan, p)
- Mutsuo Takahashi (高橋睦郎, born 1937, Japan, p/nf)
- Takako Takahashi (高橋たか子, 1932–2013, Japan, f)
- Jun Takami (高見順, 1907–1965, Japan, f/p)
- Koushun Takami (高見広春, born 1969, Japan, nf)
- Kōtarō Takamura (高村光太郎, 1883–1956, Japan, p)
- Tsugi Takano (鷹野つぎ, 1890–1943, Japan, f)
- Takarai Kikaku (宝井其角, 1661–1707, Japan, p)
- Takayama Chogyū (高山樗牛, 1871–1902, Japan, f/nf)
- Novala Takemoto (嶽本野ばら, born 1968, Japan, nf/f), pseudonym of Toshiaki Takemoto
- Michio Takeyama (竹山道雄, 1903–1984, Japan, f/nf)
- Tatsuhiko Takimoto (滝本竜彦, born 1978, Japan, f)
- Maria Takolander (born 1973, Australia, f/nf/p)
- Marie Takvam (1926–2008, Norway, p/f/ch)
- Catherine Talbot (1721–1770, England, nf)
- Nassim Nicholas Taleb (born 1960, Lebanon, nf)
- Niloufar Talebi (living, England, f/nf/d)
- Dimitar Talev (1898–1966, Bulgaria, f)
- Talhaiarn (1810–1869, Wales, p), bardic name of John Jones
- Taliesin (fl. 6th c. CE, Wales, p)
- Robin Talley (living, US, f/ch)
- Rajesh Talwar (living, India, nf)
- Mariko Tamaki (born 1975, Canada, f/nf)
- Susanna Tamaro (born 1957, Italy, f/nf)
- Áron Tamási (1897–1966, Hungary, f/d)
- Franz Tamayo (1879–1956, Bolivia, nf)
- Meary James Thurairajah Tambimuttu (1915–1983, Ceylon/England, p/nf)
- Živojin Tamburić (born 1957, Yugoslavia/Serbia, nf)
- A. H. Tammsaare (1878–1940, Russian E/Estonia, f)
- Tchicaya U Tam'si (1931–1988, Republic of the Congo, nf/p), birth name Gérald-Félix Tchicaya
- Leilani Tamu (living, N Zealand, p)
- Ryūichi Tamura (田村隆一, 1923–1998, Japan, p/nf)
- Toshiko Tamura (田村俊子, 1884–1945, Japan, f), pseudonym of Toshi Satō
- Maya Arriz Tamza (born 1957, Algeria/France, nf)
- Wassyla Tamzali (born 1941, Algeria, nf)
- Tamur Taijirō (田村泰次郎, 1911–1983, Japan, f)
- Amy Tan (born 1952, US, f/nf)
- Shaun Tan (born 1974, Australia, f)
- Tan Sitong (譚嗣同, 1865–1898, China, nf)
- Jun Tanaka (田中純, 1890–1966, Japan, p)
- Shelley Tanaka (living, Canada, ch)
- Yoshiki Tanaka (田中芳樹, born 1952, Japan, f)
- Darko Tanasković (born 1948, Yugoslavia/Serbia, nf)
- Santōka Taneda (種田山頭火, 1882–1940, Japan, p)
- Suehiro Tanemura (種村季弘, 1933–2004, Japan, nf)
- Haldun Taner (1915–1986, Ottoman E/Turkey, p/f)
- Tang Chun-i (唐君毅, 1909–1978, China, nf)
- Tang Xianzu (湯顯祖, 1550–1615, China, d)
- Tang Zhen (唐甄, 1630–1704, China, nf)
- Nagaru Tanigawa (谷川流, born 1970, Japan, f)
- Shuntarō Tanikawa (谷川俊太郎, born 1931, Japan, p)
- Tetsuzō Tanikawa (1895–1989, Japan, nf)
- Jun'ichirō Tanizaki (谷崎潤一郎, 1886–1965, Japan, f)
- Maksim Tank (1912–1995, Russian E/Belarus, nf/p)
- Reay Tannahill (1929–2007, Scotland/England, nf/f)
- Ahmet Hamdi Tanpinar (1901–1962, Ottoman E/Turkey, p/f/nf)
- Kathryn Tanquary (living, US/Japan, ch)
- Sony Lab'ou Tansi (1947–1995, Democratic R of Congo, f/p)
- Tao Yuanming (陶淵明, 365–427 CE, China, p)
- Jean Tardieu (1903–1995, France, p/d)
- Raphaël Tardon (1911–1967, Martinique/France, f/nf)
- Rudolf Tarnow (1867–1933, Germany, p/nf)
- Ellen Tarry (1906–2008, US, ch/nf)
- Donna Tartt (born 1963, US, f)
- Jovica Tasevski-Eternijan (born 1976, Yugoslavia/N Macedonia, p/nf)
- Janet Tashjian (born 1956, US, ch)
- Ana Tasić (born 1978, Yugoslavia/Serbia, nf)
- Alain Tasso (born 1962, Lebanon/France, p/nf)
- Torquato Tasso (1544–1595, Italy, p)
- Władysław Tatarkiewicz (1886–1980, Poland, nf)
- Allen Tate (1899–1979, US, p/nf), born John Orley Allen Tate
- Ellalice Tate (1906–1993, England, f), pseudonym of Eleanor Burford Hibbert
- James Tate (1943–2015, US, p/f)
- Emma Tatham (1829–1855, England, p)
- Evert Taube (1890–1976, Sweden, p/ch)
- Johannes Tauler (c. 1300–1361, Germany, nf)
- Alfredo d'Escragnolle Taunay, Viscount of Taunay (1843–1899, Brazil, nf/f)
- Ana Paula Ribeiro Tavares (born 1952, Angola, p)
- Eugénio Tavares (1867–1930, Cape Verde, p)
- Miguel Sousa Tavares (born 1952, Portugal, f/nf)
- Ivan Tavčar (1851–1923, Austrian E/Yugoslavia, f/nf)
- Zora Tavčar (born 1928, Yugoslavia/Italy, p/f/d)
- Yoko Tawada (多和田葉子, born 1960, Japan, p/f)
- Machi Tawara (俵万智, born 1962, Japan, p)
- Ahmed Khaled Tawfik (1862–1918, Egypt, f/nf/p)
- Sahar Tawfiq (born 1951, Egypt, f)
- Tracey Tawhiao (born 1967, N Zealand, p)
- Dagon Taya (1919–2013, Burma/Myanmar, nf)
- Katai Tayama (田山花袋, 1872–1930, Japan, f)
- Alasdair and Hettie Tayler (1870–1937; 1869–1951, England/Scotland, nf)
- Andrew Taylor (born 1951, England, f)
- Andrew Taylor (born 1940, Australia, p)
- Ann Taylor (1782–1866, England, p/nf)
- Anna Taylor (born 1982, N Zealand, f/nf)
- Apirana Taylor (born 1955, N Zealand, p/f)
- Chad Taylor (born 1964, N Zealand, f/d)
- Edward Taylor (c. 1642–1729, Colonial N America, p)
- Elizabeth Taylor (1912–1975, England, f)
- Emily Taylor (1795–1872, England, p/ch)
- G. P. Taylor (born 1958, England, f)
- Grace Taylor (born c. 1984, N Zealand, p)
- Henry Taylor (1800–1886, England, d/p)
- Henry S. Taylor (born 1942, US, p)
- Jane Taylor (1783–1824, England, p/f)
- Janelle Taylor (born 1944, US, f)
- John Taylor (1578–1653, England, p)
- John Taylor (1704–1766, England, nf)
- John Russell Taylor (born 1935, England, nf)
- Laurie Taylor (born 1936, England, nf)
- Mildred D. Taylor (born 1943, US, f/ch)
- Philip Meadows Taylor (1808–1876, England/France, f)
- Renée Gertrude Taylor (1929–2023, N Zealand, nf/d)
- William Taylor (1765–1836, England, nf)
- William Taylor (1922–2014, US, nf)
- William Cooke Taylor (1800–1849, Ireland, nf)
- Aisha Taymur (1840–1902, Egypt, p/f/nf)
- Mohammed ibn al-Tayyib (1698–1756, Morocco, nf)
- Abdelhadi Tazi (1921–2015, Morocco, nf)

== Tc–Th ==
- Jeannette Balou Tchichelle (1947–2005, Republic of the Congo/France, nf)
- Nicholas Tchkotoua (1909–1984, Russian E/Switzerland, f)
- Sara Teasdale (1884–1933, US, p)
- Barry Tebb (born 1942, England, p/f/nf)
- Mrs. Bartle Teeling (1851–1906, UK, nf)
- Ioan Tegid (1792–1852, Wales, nf), bardic name of John Jones
- Esaias Tegnér (1782–1846, Sweden, p)
- Faisal Tehrani (born 1974, Malaysia, f/nf/d)
- Herman Teirlinck (1879–1967, Belgium, p/f/d)
- Bahadur Tejani (born 1942, Kenya, p/f/d)
- Sava Tekelija (1761–1842, Habsburg E/Austrian E, nf)
- Gilberto Mendonça Teles (born 1931, Brazil, p)
- Telesilla (fl. 494 BCE, Greece, p)
- Janne Teller (born 1964, Denmark/US, f/nf/ch)
- Lygia Fagundes Telles (1918–2022, Brazil, f/d)
- Hervé Le Tellier (born 1957, France, f/p)
- May Telmissany (born 1965, Egypt/Canada, f/nf)
- Steve Rasnic Tem (born 1950, US, f), also as Steve Rasnic
- Florence Temko (1921–2009, England/US, nf), born Florence Maria Marx
- Philip Temple (born 1939, N Zealand, f/ch/nf)
- William F. Temple (1914–1989, England, f/d)
- Georgi Tenev (born 1969, Bulgaria, f/d)
- Habib Tengour (born 1947, Algeria/France, p/nf)
- William Tenn (1920–2010, England/US, f), pseudonym of Philip Klass
- Raipiyel Tennakoon (1899–1965, Ceylon/Sri Lanka, p/nf)
- Emma Tennant (1937–2017, England, f/nf/ch)
- Margaret Tennant (living, N Zealand, nf)
- William Tennant (1784–1848, Scotland, p/d)
- Alfred, Lord Tennyson (1809–1892, England, p)
- Francisco José Tenreiro (1921–1963, São Tomé and Príncipe/Portugal, p/nf)
- Ionel Teodoreanu (1897–1954, Romania, f/ch)
- Teodosije the Hilandarian (1246–1328, Serbia, nf/p)
- Henry Teonge (1621–1690, England, nf)
- Dumitru Țepeneag (born 1937, Romania/France, f/nf)
- Kenji Terada (寺田憲史, born 1952, Japan, d/f)
- Torahiko Terada (寺田寅彦, 1878–1935, Japan, nf)
- Lisa St Aubin de Terán (born 1953, England, f/nf)
- Shūji Terayama (寺山修司, 1935–1983, Japan, f/d/nf)
- Eugène Terre'Blanche (1941–2010, S Africa, nf/p)
- Daniel Terdiman (living, US, nf)
- Vahan Terian (1885–1920, Russian E/Russian F, p)
- Jan Terlouw (born 1931, Netherlands, f/ch)
- Elaine Terranova (born 1939, US, p)
- Marshall Terrill (born 1963, US, nf)
- J. E. Harold Terry (1885–1939, England, f/d/nf)
- Lucy Terry (c. 1730–1821, US, p)
- Tom Terry (born 1963, England/Mongolia, nf)
- Gerhard Tersteegen (1697–1769, Germany, nf/p)
- Jasmina Tešanović (born 1954, Yugoslavia/Italy, nf/f)
- Steve Tesich (1942–1996, Yugoslavia/Canada, d/f)
- Srđan V. Tešin (born 1971, Yugoslavia/Serbia, nf)
- A. S. J. Tessimond (1902–1962, England, p)
- Jefrem Janković Tetovac (c. 1640–1718, Ottoman E/Russia, nf)
- Neyzen Tevfik (1879–1953, Ottoman E/Turkey, p)
- Walter Tevis (1928–1984, US, f)
- Philip Tew (living, England, nf/f)
- Josephine Tey (1896–1952, Scotland/England, f/d), pseudonym of Elizabeth MacKintosh
- Munira Thabit (1902–1967, Egypt, nf)
- James Thackara (born 1944, US/England, f)
- Cathy Gillen Thacker (living, US, f)
- Eugene Thacker (living, US, nf/p/f)
- William Makepeace Thackeray (1811–1863, England, f/nf)
- Thales of Miletus (c. 624/623 – c. 548/545 BCE, Greece, nf)
- Kálmán Thaly (1839–1909, Austria-Hungary, p/nf)
- Ba Than (1870s – c. 1931, Burma, nf/f/p)
- Ma Thanegi (born 1946, Burma/Myanmar, nf)
- Shashi Tharoor (born 1956, India, f/nf)
- U Thaung (1926–2008, Burma/US, nf)
- Ernest Thayer (1863–1940, US, p)
- Iván Thays (born 1968, Peru, f/nf)
- Françoise Thébaud (born 1952, France, nf)
- Hmawbi Saya Thein (1862–1942, Burma, nf)
- The Two Steves (living, England, ch)
- Min Theinkha (1939–2008, Burma/Myanmar, f), born Aung Htun
- John Thelwall (1764–1834, England, nf/p)
- Can Themba (1924–1967, S Africa, f)
- Stephanie Theobald (born 1966, England, f/nf)
- Jürgen Theobaldy (born 1944, p/f/nf)
- Theocritus (c. 300 – post-260 BCE, Sicily, p)
- Antony Theodore (born 1954, India/Germany, p)
- Theopompus (c. 380 – c. 315 BCE, Greece, nf)
- Louis Theroux (born 1970, Singapore/US, nf)
- Marcel Theroux (born 1968, Uganda/US, f)
- Wilfred Thesiger (1910–2003, Ethiopia/England, nf)
- Jean Thesman (1929–2016, US, ch)
- Jan Theuninck (born 1954, Belgium, p)
- Issa Laye Thiaw (1943–2017, Senegal, nf)
- Rama Thiaw (born 1978, Senegal, d)
- Philip Thicknesse (1719–1792, England, nf)
- Ma Thida (born c. 1966, Burma/Myanmar, nf)
- Colin Thiele (1920–2006, Australia, ch)
- Joseph Albert Alberdingk Thijm (1820–1889, Netherlands, nf/p)
- Felix Thijssen (1933–2022, Netherlands, f/ch)
- Nandi Thimmana (fl. 15th/16th c. CE, Vijayanagara E, p)
- Aung Thin (1927–2014, Burma/Myanmar, nf)
- Angela Thirkell (1890–1961, England/Australia, f)
- Adam Thirlwell (born 1978, England, f/nf)
- Thiruvalluvar (fl. 4th c. BCE – 5th c. CE, India)
- Ludwig Thoma (1867–1961, Germany, nf/f)
- Thomas of Britain (fl. 12th c., England, p)
- David Thomas (Dewi Hefin) (1928–2009, Wales, p)
- David Thomas (1880–1967, Wales, nf)
- Dylan Thomas (1914–1953, Wales, p/d/f)
- Ebenezer Thomas (1802–1863, Wales, p), bardic name Eben Fardd
- Edward Thomas (1878–1917, England/France, p/nf/f)
- Elean Thomas (1947–2004, Jamaica, p/f/nf)
- Elizabeth Thomas (1770/1771–1855, England, p/f)
- Gwyn Thomas (1936–2016, Wales, p/nf)
- Jodi Thomas (living, US, f)
- Joyce Carol Thomas (1938–2016, US, p/d/ch)
- Lorenzo Thomas (1944–2005, Panama/US, p/nf)
- Louie Myfanwy Thomas (1908–1968, Wales, f)
- Ngaire Thomas (1943–2012, N Zealand, nf)
- R. S. Thomas (1913–2000, Wales, p/nf)
- Rob Thomas (born 1965, US, d/f)
- Robert Thomas (Ap Vychan) (1809–1980, Wales, nf/p)
- Rosie Thomas (born 1947, Wales/England, f/nf)
- Scarlett Thomas (born 1972, England, f/ch/nf)
- William Thomas (Islwyn) (1832–1878, Wales, p)
- William Thomas (Gwilym Marles) (1834–1879, Wales, p/f)
- William Beach Thomas (1868–1957, England, nf)
- Edward Roffe Thompson (1891–1973, England, nf)
- Flora Thompson (1876–1947, England, f/p)
- Francis Thompson (1859–1907, England, p/nf)
- Fred Thompson (1884–1949, England, p/d)
- Hunter S. Thompson (1937–2005, US, nf/d)
- John Thompson (1938–1976, England/Canada, p)
- John Reuben Thompson (1823–1873, US, p/nf)
- Kate Thompson (born 1956, England/Ireland, ch)
- Kate Thompson (born 1959, N Ireland/Ireland, f)
- Kirsten Moana Thompson (born 1964, N Zealand/US, nf)
- Kristin Thompson (born 1950, US, nf)
- Maggie Thompson (born 1942, US, nf)
- Mervyn Thompson (1935–1992, N Zealand, nf/d)
- Ruth Plumly Thompson (1891–1976, US, ch)
- Silvanus P. Thompson (1851–1916, England, nf)
- Vicki Lewis Thompson (born 1950, US, f)
- Grímur Thomsen (1820–1896, Iceland, p/nf)
- A. A. Thomson (1894–1968, England, nf/f/d)
- Alice Thomson (born 1967, England, nf)
- Edward William Thomson (1849–1924, Canada, f/p)
- James Thomson (1700–1748, Scotland/England, p)
- James Thomson (1834–1882, Scotland/England, p)
- Melanie Rae Thon (born 1957, US, f/nf)
- Bjarni Thorarensen (1786–1841, Iceland, p)
- Arndís Þórarinsdóttir (born 1982, Iceland, ch)
- Brynhildur Þórarinsdóttir (born 1970, Iceland, ch)
- Árni Þórarinsson (born 1950, Iceland, f)
- Þorbjörn dísarskáld (fl. late 10th c., Iceland, p), "Poet of the Female Deities"
- Óláfr Þórðarson (c. 1212–1259, Iceland, nf/p)
- Sigvatr Þórðarson (995–1045, Iceland, p)
- Sturla Þórðarson (1214–1284, Iceland, p)
- Þórbergur Þórðarson (1888/1889–1974, Iceland, f/nf)
- Henry David Thoreau (1817–1862, US, nf/p)
- Magdalene Thoresen (1918–2003, Denmark/Norway, p/f/d)
- Þorgils gjallandi (1851–1915, Iceland, f), birth name Jón Stefánsson
- Ari Thorgilsson (1067–1148, Iceland, nf)
- Þorleifr jarlsskáld (fl. late 10th c. CE, Iceland, p/f), birth name Þorleifr Rauðfeldarson
- George Walter Thornbury (1828–1876, England, f/nf/p)
- Russell Thorndike (1885–1972, England, f)
- Kip Thorne (born 1940, US)
- Tim Thorne (1944–2021, Australia, p)
- Elizabeth Thornton (1940–2010, Scotland/Canada, f)
- Valgerður Þóroddsdóttir (born 1989, Iceland, p)
- Emil Thoroddsen (1898–1944, Iceland, d/nf)
- Halldóra K. Thoroddsen (1950–2020, Iceland, p/f)
- Jón Thoroddsen (1818–1868, p/f)
- Jón Thoroddsen (1898–1924, f)
- Skapti Þóroddsson (died 1030, Iceland, p)
- Adam Thorpe (born 1956, England, p/f/d)
- Sylvia Thorpe (1926–2023, England, f), pseudonym of June Sylvia Thimblethorpe
- Guðmundur Andri Thorsson (born 1957, Iceland, f/nf)
- Indriði G. Þorsteinsson (1926–2000, Iceland, f/nf)
- Pétur Þorsteinsson (born 1955, Iceland, nf)
- Skúli Þórsteinsson (fl. 11th c. CE, Iceland, p)
- Steingrímur Thorsteinsson (1831–1913, Iceland, p/f)
- Torfhildur Þorsteinsdóttir (1845–1918, Iceland/Canada, f)
- Þorvaldr veili (fl. late 10th c. CE, Iceland, p)
- Kerstin Thorvall (1925–2010, Sweden, f)
- Ólína Þorvarðardóttir (born 1958, Iceland, nf/p)
- Þorgrímur Þráinsson (born 1959, Iceland, nf)
- Hester Thrale (1740 or 1741–1821, Wales/England, nf)
- Godfrey Thring (1823–1903, England, p)
- Colin Thubron (born 1939, England, nf/f)
- Thucydides (c. 460 – c. 400 BCE, Greece, nf)
- Thukha (1910–2005, Burma/Myanmar, d/p/f)
- Moritz August von Thümmel (1738–1817, Germany, p/f)
- Carl L. Thunberg (born 1963, Sweden, nf)
- James Thurber (1894–1961, US, f/ch/d)
- Harry Thürk (1927–2005, Germany, f/nf/ch)
- Georg Thurmair (1909–1984, Germany, p/nf/d)
- Maria Luise Thurmair (1912–2005, Austria-Hungary/Germany, p/nf)
- Joseph Thurston (1704–1732, England, p)
- Robert Thurston (1936–2021, US, f)
- Anthony Thwaite (1930–2021, England, p/nf)
- Michael Thwaites (1915–2005, Australia, p)
- Pascal Khoo Thwe (born 1967, Burma/England, nf)
- Johanna Thydell (born 1980, Sweden, ch)
- Félix Thyes (1830–1855, Luxembourg, f/nf)

== Ti–To ==
- Tian Gang (田刚, born 1958, China, nf)
- Tian Han (田漢, 1898–1968, China, d/p)
- Tian Yuan (田原, born 1985, China, p/f)
- Tibullus (c. 55–19 BCE, Roman E, p)
- Chidiock Tichborne (post-1562–1586, England, p)
- Crispin Tickell (1930–2022, England, nf)
- Thomas Tickell (1685–1740, England, p)
- Tie Ning (鐵凝, born 1957, China, f/nf)
- Ludwig Tieck (1773–1853, Germany, p/f/nf)
- Sophie Tieck (1775–1833, Germany/Russian E, f/p)
- Edilberto K. Tiempo (1913–1996, Philippines, f/p)
- Edith Tiempo (1919–2011, Philippines, p/f/nf)
- Tikkana (1205–1288, Nellore, p)
- Carl Frode Tiller (born 1970, Norway, f)
- Gary Tillery (born 1947, US, nf)
- Patrick Tilley (1928–2020, England, f)
- Kathleen Mary Tillotson (1906–2001, England, nf)
- Stella Tillyard (born 1957, England/US, nf)
- Frank Tilsley (1904–1957, England, f/d)
- Abdillahi Suldaan Mohammed Timacade (1920–1973, Somaliland, p)
- Jacobo Timerman (1923–1999, USSR/Argentina, nf)
- Uwe Timm (1932–2014, Germany/Spain, nf)
- Uwe Timm (born 1940, Germany, f/p/ch)
- Felix Timmermans (1886–1947, Belgium, d/f/p)
- Timrava (1867–1951, Hungary/Czechoslovakia, f/d)
- Pe Maung Tin (1888–1973, Burma, nf)
- Matthew Tindal (1657–1733, England, nf)
- Lillian Tindyebwa (living, Uganda, f/ch)
- Peter Tinniswood (1936–2003, England, d/f)
- Mya Than Tint (1929–1998, Burma/Myanmar, f)
- Lola Rodríguez de Tió (1843–1924, Puerto Rico/Cuba, p)
- Richard Tipping (born 1949, Australia, p)
- James Tiptree, Jr (1915–1987, US, f), pseudonym of Alice Sheldon
- Roberto Tiraboschi (born 1951, Italy, d/f)
- Bogdan Tirnanić (1941–2009, Yugoslavia/Serbia, nf)
- Aleksandar Tišma (1924–2003, Yugoslavia/Serbia, f)
- Kata Tisza (born 1980, Romania, f)
- Alan Titchmarsh (born 1949, England, nf/p/f)
- Eve Titus (1922–2002, US, ch)
- Bhim Nidhi Tiwari (1911–1973, Nepal, p/f/d)
- Héctor Tizón (1929–2012, Argentina, f/nf)
- Eugeniusz Tkaczyszyn-Dycki (born 1962, Poland, p/nf)
- Miriam Tlali (1933–2017, S Africa, f)
- Mustapha Tlili (1937–2017, Tunisia, f)
- Héctor Tobar (born 1963, US, f/nf)
- Affaf Tobbala (born 1941, Egypt, ch)
- Mahjoub Tobji (born 1942, Morocco/France, nf)
- Nick Toczek (born 1950, England, p/nf)
- Ada Josephine Todd (1858–1904, United States, f)
- Barbara Euphan Todd (1890–1976, England, ch/p/f)
- Deborah Todd (living, US, nf)
- H. E. Todd (1908–1988, England, ch)
- John Todhunter (1839–1916, Ireland/England, p/d)
- Petko Todorov (1879–1916, Bulgaria, nf/d/p)
- Dana Todorović (born 1977, Yugoslavia/Serbia, f/ch)
- Miroljub Todorović (born 1940, Yugoslavia/Serbia, p/nf/ch)
- Pramoedya Ananta Toer (1925–2006, Dutch E Indies/Indonesia, f/nf)
- Dejan Tofčević (born 1971, Yugoslavia/Serbia, f/p)
- Alvin Toffler (1928–2016, US, nf)
- Ekaterine Togonidze (born 1981, USSR/Georgia, f/nf)
- Colm Tóibín (born 1955, Ireland, f/nf/d)
- Tokai Sanshi (東海散士, 1852–1922, Japan, f), pseudonym of Shiba Shirō (柴四郎)
- Olga Tokarczuk (born 1962, Poland, f/p/nf)
- Shūsei Tokuda (徳田秋声, 1872–1943, Japan, f)
- Kenjirō Tokutomi (徳富健次郎, 1868–1927, Japan, f/nf)
- John Toland (1912–2004, US, nf/f)
- Astrid Tollefsen (1897–1973, Norway, p)
- Lynn Toler (born 1959, US, nf)
- J. R. R. Tolkien (1892–1973, England, f/nf/ch)
- Eckhart Tolle (born 1948, Germany/Canada, nf)
- Astrid Tollefsen (1897–1973, Norway, p)
- Ernst Toller (1893–1939, Germany/US, d)
- Melvin B. Tolson (1898–1966, UK, p/nf)
- Aleksey Konstantinovich Tolstoy (1817–1875, Russian E, p/f/d)
- Aleksey Nikolayevich Tolstoy (1883–1945, Russian E/USSR, f/p/nf)
- Alexandra Tolstoy (born 1973, England, nf), born Alexandra Tolstoy-Miloslavsky
- Leo Tolstoy (1828–1910, Russia E, f/nf/d)
- Claire Tomalin (born 1933, England, nf)
- George Vid Tomashevich (1927–2009, Yugoslavia/US, p/nf)
- Samo Tomášik (1813–1887, Austria-Hungary/Hungary, p/f/nf)
- Robert Tombs (born 1949, England, nf)
- Tânia Tomé (born 1981, Mozambique, nf/p)
- Yoshiyuki Tomino (富野由悠季, born 1941, Japan, d/p/f)
- Makoto Tomioka (富岡誠, 1897–1926, Japan, nf)
- Charles Tomlinson (1927–2015, England, p/nf)
- Theresa Tomlinson (born 1946, England, ch)
- Niccolò Tommaseo (1802–1874, Italy, nf)
- Angharad Tomos (born 1958, Wales, f/ch/nf)
- Mihály Tompa (1819–1868, Hungary, p/nf)
- Charles Tompson (1807–1883, Australia, p)
- Rosemary Tonks (1928–2014, England, p/f/nf)
- F.X. Toole (1930–2002, US, f), pseudonym of Jerry Boyd
- John Kennedy Toole (1937–1969, US, f)
- Jean Toomer (1894–1967, US, p/nf/f)
- Paige Toon (born 1975, Australia/England, f/ch)
- Marten Toonder (1912–2005, Netherlands, nf)
- Zaim Topčić (1920–1990, Yugoslavia/Bosnia-Herzegovina, f/d/nf)
- Zlatko Topčić (born 1955, Yugoslavia/Bosnia-Herzegovina, d/f)
- Zachris Topelius (1818–1898, Finland, p/f/nf)
- George Topîrceanu (1886–1937, Romania, p/f/nf)
- Angela Topping (born 1954, England, p/nf)
- Hasan Ali Toptaş (born 1958, Turkey, f)
- Elena Topuridze (1922–2004, USSR/Georgia, nf)
- Khal Torabully (born 1956, Mauritius/France, p/nf)
- Remigio Crespo Toral (1860–1939, Ecuador, nf/p)
- Friedrich Torberg (1908–1979, Austria, f/nf)
- Thormodus Torfæus (1636–1719, Iceland, nf)
- Mikael Torfason (born 1974, Iceland, f/d/nf)
- Miguel Torga (1907–1995, Portugal, f/p/nf), pseudonym of Adolfo Correia da Rocha
- Igor Torkar (1913–2004, Yugoslavia/Slovenia, f/d/p)
- Julien Torma (1902 – post-1932, France/Austria, f/d/p)
- Cécile Tormay (1876–1937, Hungary, f)
- Fermín Toro (1806–1865, Venezuela, nf/f)
- Abdelkhalek Torres (1910–1970, Morocco, nf/d)
- Álvaro Torres-Calderón (born 1975, Peru, p)
- Evangelista Torricelli (1608–1647, Italy, nf)
- Simone della Tosa (1270–1380), Italy, nf)
- Nick Tosches (1949–2019, US, f/nf/p)
- Cayetano Coll y Toste (1850–1930, nf)
- Árpád Tóth (1886–1928, Hungary, p)
- Kálmán Tóth (1831–1881, Hungary, p/d)
- Krisztina Tóth (born 1967, Hungary, f/p)
- Sándor Tóth (1939–2019, Hungary, p/nf)
- Ahmed Toufiq (born 1943, Morocco, f/nf)
- Thomas Toughill (living, Scotland, nf)
- Houcine Toulali (1924–1998, Morocco, p)
- Paul-Jean Toulet (1867–1920, France, p/f)
- Ahmed Sékou Touré (1922–1984, Guinea, nf/p)
- Cyril Tourneur (died 1626, England, d/p)
- Michel Tournier (1924–1916, France, f/nf)
- Mary Tourtel (1874–1948, England, ch)
- Auguste Toussaint (1911–1987, Mauritius, nf)
- Ann Townsend (born 1962, US, p/nf)
- Sue Townsend (1946–2014, England, f/d/nf)
- Hazel Townson (1928–2010, England, ch)
- Barbara Toy (1908–2001, Australia/England, nf/d)
- Arnold J. Toynbee (1889–1975, England, nf)
- Philip Toynbee (1916–1981, England, f/p/nf)
- Polly Toynbee (born 1946, England, nf/f)

== Tr–Ty ==
- Bahaa Trabelsi (born 1966, Morocco/France, f)
- Mona Tracy (1892–1959, N Zealand, ch/p/f)
- Thomas Traherne (1636 or 1637–1674, England, p/nf)
- Catharine Parr Traill (1802–1899, England/Canada, ch/f/nf)
- Nenad Trajković (born 1982, Yugoslavia/Serbia, p/nf)
- Georg Trakl (1887–1914, Austrian E, p)
- Tomas Tranströmer (1931–2015, Sweden, p/nf)
- John Tranter (1943–2023, Australia, p)
- Nigel Tranter (1909–2000, Scotland, nf/f)
- Abibatou Traoré (born 1973, Senegal, nf)
- Aminata Traoré (born 1947, Mali, nf)
- Falaba Issa Traoré (1930–2003, Mali, d)
- Anna Trapnel (fl. 1650s, England, nf)
- B. Traven (1882 or 1890–1967, Germany/Mexico, f), identity unclear
- Pamela Travers (1899–1996, Australia/England, ch/nf)
- Rebecca Travers (1609–1688, England, nf)
- Susan Travers (1909–2003, England/France, nf)
- Karen Traviss (living, England, f)
- Janez Trdina (1830–1905, Austrian E, f)
- Mary Treadgold (1910–2005, England, ch/f)
- Elizabeth Treadwell (born 1967, US, p)
- Geoffrey Trease (1909–1998, England, ch)
- Mark Tredinnick (born 1962, Australia, p/nf)
- Miles Tredinnick (born 1955, England, d)
- Henry Treece (1911–1966, England, p/ch)
- Walter Hawken Tregellas 1831–1894, England, nf)
- Sharon Tregenza (born 1951, England, ch/p)
- Rose Tremain (born 1943, England, f)
- Roland Michel Tremblay (born 1972, Canada, f/nf/p)
- Rex Tremlett (1903–1986, England, nf)
- Laura Trenter (born 1961, Sweden, f/nf)
- Stieg Trenter (1914–1967, Sweden, f)
- Ulla Trenter (1936–2019, Sweden, f)
- Ada Trevanion (1829–1882, England, f)
- G. E. Trevelyan (1903–1941, England, f)
- Jill Trevelyan (born 1963, N Zealand, nf)
- Meriol Trevor (1919–2000, England, nf/f/ch)
- Kosta Trifković (1843–1875, Austrian E, d/f)
- Duško Trifunović (1933–2006, Yugoslavia/Serbia, p/f)
- Calvin Trillin (born 1935, US, p/nf/f)
- Barbara Margaret Trimble (1921–1995, Wales, f)
- Sarah Trimmer (1741–1810, England, ch/nf)
- Geeta Tripathee (born 1972, Nepal, p/nf)
- Suryakant Tripathi (1896–1961, India, p/f/nf)
- Ilija Trojanow (born 1965, Bulgaria/Austria, nf)
- Anthony Trollope (1815–1882, England, f/nf)
- Frances Eleanor Trollope (1835–1913, Italy/England, f)
- Frances Milton Trollope (1779–1863, England, f/nf)
- Joanna Trollope (1943–2025, England, f/nf), pseudonym Caroline Harvey
- Theodosia Trollope (1816–1865, England/Italy, f)
- Thomas Adolphus Trollope (1810–1892, England/Italy, f/nf)
- Sergio Troncoso (born 1961, US, f/nf)
- Leon Trotsky (1879–1940, Russia/Soviet Union, nf)
- Birgitta Trotzig (1929–2011, Sweden, f/nf/p)
- Amélie Rives Troubetzkoy (1863–1945, US, f/p/d)
- Evgenii Nikolaevitch Troubetzkoy (1863–1920, Russian E, nf)
- Quincy Troupe (born 1939, US, p/nf)
- Henri Troyat (1911–2007, Russian E/France, f/nf)
- Chrétien de Troyes (c. 1135 – c. 1185, France/Flanders, p)
- Primož Trubar (1508–1586, Carniola/Germany, nf)
- Nikolai Trubetzkoy (1890–1938, Russian E/Austria, nf)
- Sergei Nikolaevich Trubetskoy (1862–1905, Russian E, nf)
- Tõnu Trubetsky (born 1963, USSR/Estonia, nf)
- Antonio de Trueba (1821–1889, Spain, p/f/nf)
- Meta Truscott (1917–2014, Australia, nf)
- Lynne Truss (born 1955, England, nf/f/d)
- Avksenty Tsagareli (1857–1902, Russian E, d)
- Dimitris Tsaloumas (1921–2016, Greece/Australia, p)
- Gregory Tsamblak (c. 1365–1420, Bulgaria/Ukraine, nf)
- Stefan Tsanev (born 1936, Bulgaria, nf/d/p)
- Alexander Tsaturyan (1865–1917, Russian E, p)
- Akaki Tsereteli (1840–1915, Russian E, p/f)
- Mariam Tsiklauri (born 1960, Russian E/Georgia, p/ch)
- Zing Tsjeng (born 1988, Singapore/England, nf)
- Marina Tsvetaeva (1892–1941, Russian E/USSR, p)
- Pavel Tsvetkov (born 1971, Bulgaria, p/nf)
- Tsubouchi Shōyō (坪内逍遥, 1859–1935, Japan, nf/d)
- Jun Tsuji (辻潤, 1884–1944, Japan, p/nf/d)
- Kunio Tsuji (辻邦生, 1925–1999, Japan, f/nf)
- Tsunashima Ryōsen (綱島梁川, 1873–1907, Japan, nf)
- Iakob Tsurtaveli (fl. 5th c. CE, Georgia, nf)
- Yasutaka Tsutsui (筒井康隆, born 1934, Japan, f)
- Barbara W. Tuchman (1912–1989, US, nf)
- Kurt Tucholsky (1890–1935, Germany, nf)
- Catherine Tucker (born 1977, England/US, nf)
- Charlotte Maria Tucker (1821–1893, England, ch/f/p)
- Josiah Tucker (1713–1799, Wales/England, nf)
- Nicholas Tucker (living, England, nf)
- Wilson Tucker (1914–2006, US, f)
- C. J. Tudor (living, England, f)
- Dorin Tudoran (born 1945, Romania/US, p/nf)
- Radu Tudoran (1910–1992, Romania, f)
- Tug Dumbly (living, Australia, p), pseudonym of Geoff Forrester
- Jethro Tull (1674–1741, England, nf)
- Christian Braunmann Tullin (1728–1765, Norway, p)
- Mark Tully (born 1935, England/India, nf)
- Tulsidas (1532–1623, Mughal E, p/d)
- Anastasia Tumanishvili-Tsereteli (1849–1932, Russian E/USSR, nf)
- Hama Tuma (born 1949, Ethiopia/France, p/f/nf)
- Hovhannes Tumanyan (1869–1923, Russian E/USSR, p/f)
- Mohammed ibn Tumart (c. 1080–1128/1130, Morocco, nf)
- Kolbeinn Tumason (1173–1208, Iceland, p)
- Tumusiime Rushedge (1941–2008, Uganda, f/nf)
- Than Tun (1923–2005, Burma/Myanmar, nf)
- John R. Tunis (1889–1975, US, f/ch)
- Michael O. Tunnell (born 1950, US, ch)
- Göran Tunström (1937–2000, Sweden, f/p)
- Frank Tuohy (1925–1999, England, f)
- Ilkka Tuomi (born 1958, Finland, nf)
- Ğabdulla Tuqay (1886–1913, Russian E, p/nf)
- David Turashvili (born 1966, USSR/Georgia, f)
- George Turberville (c. 1540 – pre-1597, England, p)
- Froylán Turcios (1875–1943, Honduras, nf/f)
- Ivan Turgenev (1818–1883, Russia, f/p/d)
- Ann Turnbull (born 1943, England, ch)
- Colin Turnbull (1924–1994, England/US, nf)
- Brian Turner (born 1944, N Zealand, p/nf)
- Charles Tennyson Turner (1808–1879, England, p)
- Clorinda Matto de Turner (1852–1909, Peru, f/nf)
- Ethel Turner (1872–1958, England/Australia, f/ch)
- Julian Turner (born 1955, England, p)
- Megan Whalen Turner (born 1965, US, f/ch)
- Philip Turner (1925–2006, England, ch/f)
- Thomas Turner (1729–1793, England, nf)
- William Turner (1509/1510–1568, England, nf)
- Josipina Turnograjska (1833–1854, Austrian E, f/p)
- Helene Tursten (born 1954, Sweden, f)
- Harry Turtledove (born 1949, US, f)
- Darko Tuševljaković (born 1978, Yugoslavia/Serbia, f)
- Thomas Tusser (c. 1524–1580, England, p)
- Marit Tusvik (born 1951, Norway, p/ch/d)
- Petre Țuțea (1902–1991, Romania, nf)
- Amos Tutuola (1920–1997, Nigeria, nf)
- Emma Rood Tuttle (1839–1916, US, p/nf)
- Hone Tuwhare (1922–2008, N Zealand, p)
- Julian Tuwim (1894–1953, Poland, p)
- Jens Tvedt (1857–1935, Norway, f)
- Mark Twain (1835–1910, US, f/nf), pseudonym of Samuel Clemens
- Szczepan Twardoch (born 1979, Poland, f)
- Jan Twardowski (1915–2006, Poland, p)
- Thomas F. Tweed (1891–1940, England, f)
- Chase Twichell (born 1950, US, p)
- Nick Twinamatsiko (living, Uganda, f/p)
- Twm o'r Nant (1739–1810, Wales, d/p)
- Hilda Twongyeirwe (living, Uganda, f/nf/ch)
- Sarah Tyacke (born 1945, England, nf)
- Pontus de Tyard (c. 1521–1605, France, p/nf)
- Kathy Tyers (born 1952, US, f)
- Anne Tyler (born 1941, US, f/nf)
- Tyrfingur Tyrfingsson (born 1987, Iceland, d/nf)
- Alberto Barrera Tyszka (Venezuela, f/nf/p)
- Edward Tyson (1651–1708, England, nf)
- Neil deGrasse Tyson (born 1958, US, nf)
- James Tytler (1745–1804, Scotland, nf)
- Fyodor Tyutchev (1803–1873, Russian E, p)
- Tristan Tzara (1896–1963, Romania/France, p/f/nf), pseudonym of Samy Rosenstock
