= Trenter =

Trenter is a surname. Notable people with the surname include:

- Laura Trenter (born 1961), Swedish author, daughter of Stieg and Ulla
- Stieg Trenter (1914–1967), Swedish journalist and crime writer
- Ulla Trenter (1936–2019), Swedish author
