= Trevanion (surname) =

Trevanion is an English surname. Notable people with the surname include:

- Ada Trevanion, 19th century British poet and author
- Charles Trevanion, 17th century English politician
- Charles Trevanion (1631–1703), 17th century English politician
- Christina Trevanion (born 1981), British auctioneer and television personality
- John Trevanion (disambiguation), multiple people
- William Trevanion, 18th century British politician
