= Jalakas =

Family name

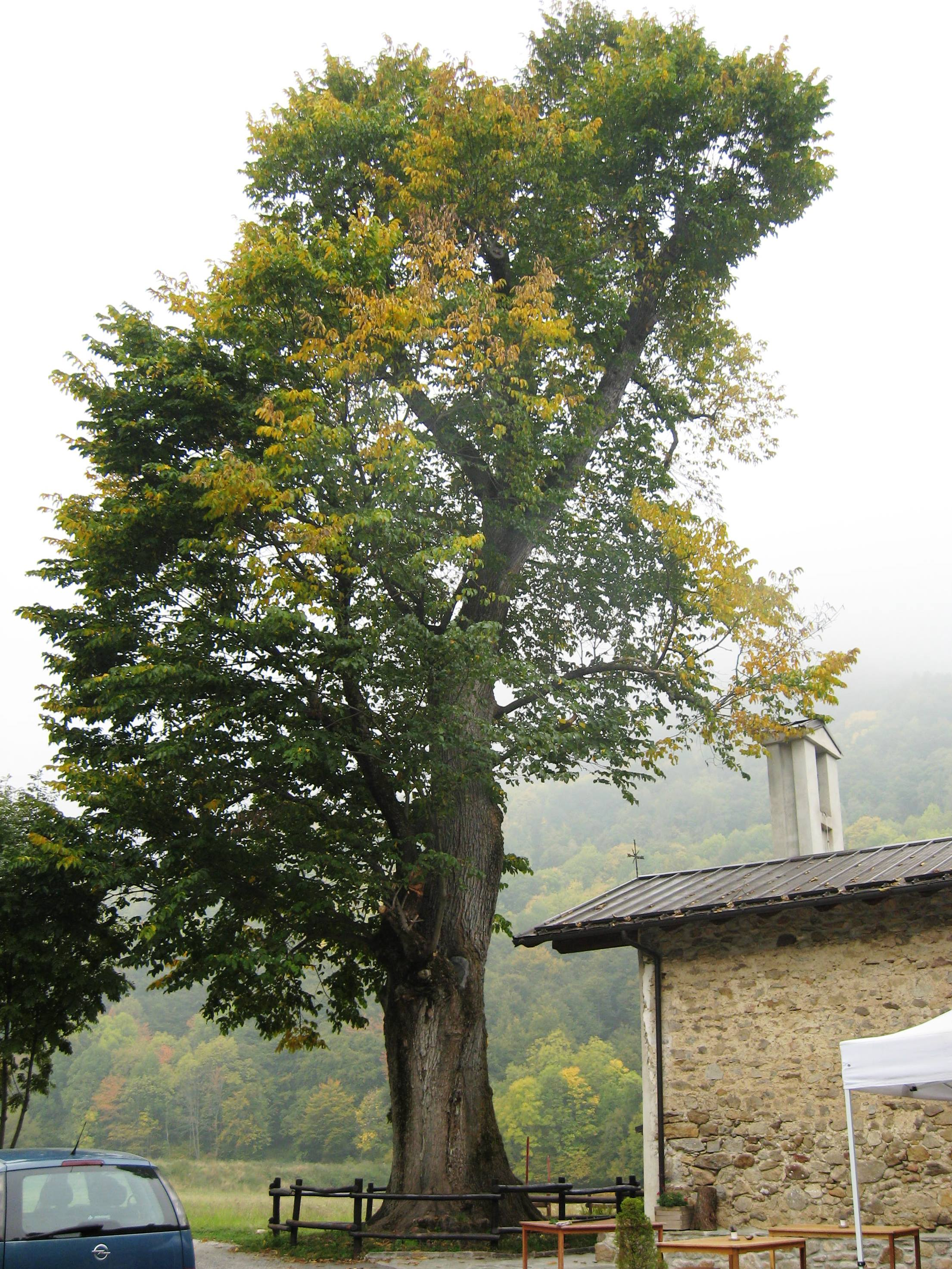

Origin
- Language: Estonian
- Meaning: Elm (Ulmus)
- Region of origin: Estonia

Jalakas is an Estonian surname meaning elm.

As of 1 January 2021, 221 men and 261 women in Estonia bear the surname Jalakas. Jalakas is ranked as the 246th most common surname for men in Estonia, and 226th for women. The surname Jalakas is most common in Saare County, where 14.88 per 10,000 inhabitants of the county bear the surname.

Notable people bearing the surname Jalakas include:

- Inger Jalakas (born 1951), Swedish author and journalist
- Karl-Arnold Jalakas (1901–1942), Estonian politician
- Merle Jalakas (born 1968), Estonian opera singer
- Peeter Jalakas (born 1961), Estonian theatre director, producer, playwright and restaurateur
- Rudolf Jalakas (1914–1997), Estonian-Swedish economist and banker
