= Sergei Trubetskoy =

Sergei Trubetskoy may refer to:

- Sergei Petrovich Troubetzkoy (1790–1860), Decembrist leader
- Sergei Nikolaevich Trubetskoy (1863–1905), Russian philosopher

== See also ==
- Trubetskoy
