= Sturemordet =

Sturemordet may refer to

- the Sture Murders
- Sturemordet by Stieg Trenter
