= Zemstvo =

Institution of local government in the Russian Empire

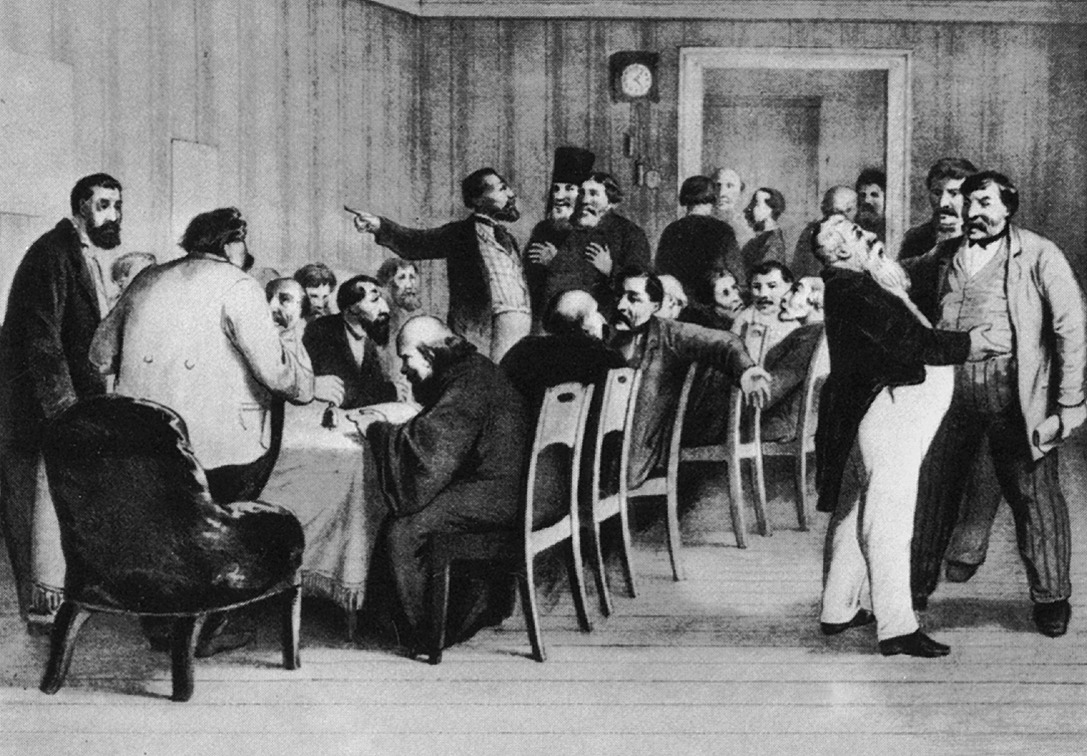
A Provincial Zemstvo Assembly. Konstantin Trutovsky, 1868 (Note: Quote: "Трутовский понял, что участие крестьян в земствах было фикцией все равно распоряжались там крупные землевладельцы . В рисунке "Земское собрание в провинции" он противопоставил безмолвных крестьян шумным помещикам." [Trutovsky realized that the participation of peasants in the zemstvos was a fiction – large landowners were in charge there anyway. In the drawing "A Provincial Zemstvo Assembly" he contrasted silent peasants with the noisy pomeshchiks.])

A zemstvo (Russian: земство, IPA: [ˈzʲɛmstvə], pl. земства, zemstva) (Note: The word derives from земля (zemlyá), lit. 'land, country, state'.) was an institution of local government set up in 1864 following the emancipation reform of 1861. The system was abolished in the wake of the October Revolution.

Zemstvos were representative governments with budgetary and executive authority. Although favoring the nobility, they provided representation to the peasantry and supported a new middle class. They implemented controversial new taxes and spent funds on new educational and medical systems.

== History ==
Zemstvos were created as part of the larger Great Reforms with the specific goal of creating organs of elected, local self-government. The existing system of local self-government in the Russian Empire was represented at the lowest level by the mir and at the regional level by the volost. These institutions continued during the zemstvo period; however, they were seen as insufficient, due to their lack of independent authority. In 1864, the first law on zemstvos was enacted by the Emperor, a law that outlined the powers of the zemstvos. These powers were administrative and focused on local issues that were not being addressed by existing institutions.

In 1865, zemstvos were established in nineteen provinces, and between 1866 and 1876 another sixteen were established, for a total of 35 zemstvos in European Russia and Bessarabia, with some exceptions: there were no zemstvos in the three Baltic governorates, the nine western governorates annexed from Poland by Catherine II, in most of the Caucasus, and in Finland. Created in 1875 after much consultation with Cossack officials, the zemstvos of the Don Host Oblast were dissolved after six years of operation. By 1913 there were zemstvos in 43 governorates.

From 1902 to 1905, there were widespread reports of a total loss of independence on the part of the peasant members of the zemstvos, with authority being ceded to the land captains. During this time, local government was more closely connected to the central bureaucracy, such as the governors' offices, the ministers of finance, and the ministers of interior. The special police became more and more involved in zemstvo affairs. This was unpopular with zemstvo officials, many of whom were part of a liberal constitutionalist political movement. Financial and practical burdens, as a result of the Russo-Japanese War, contributed to increased tensions.

Rising distrust between the central bureaucracy and the zemstvos was recognized by the Tsar in his 1903 manifesto on provincial administration. This manifesto supported the reforms led by Minister of Interior Vyacheslav von Plehve. The goal of Plehve's reforms was to bring tighter control of the zemstvos through gubernatorial oversight. These reforms faced significant opposition from the zemstvos, the ministers of finance, and several governors. In Saint Petersburg, Plehve was able to force the governor, who opposed the reforms, to resign. Plehve worked closely with the Police Department of Russia, which he formerly led, to oust many zemstvo members. Several prominent zemstvo figures were formally reprimanded by the Tsar.

Following the Russian Peasants' uprising of 1905–1906, the zemstvos turned sharply conservative. Georgy Lvov was voted off a zemstvo for being a "dangerous liberal". The zemstvo assemblies, still dominated by nobility, were frightened by the violence of 1905. Many members joined the United Nobility, and the zemstvos became more focused on protecting the interests of the nobility than addressing the grievances of 1905.

The zemstvos were originally given considerable power to impose taxation and to oversee education, medical relief, public welfare, food supply, and road maintenance in their localities. Initially, radicals, such as the Socialist Revolutionary Party and the nihilists, were hostile, believing that the reforms were too minor. Still, in his 1901 article "What is to be done", Lenin advocated for a short-term alliance with the zemstvos against Tsarist oppression.

As Prime Minister, Pyotr Stolypin gave zemstvos the budget and authority needed to carry out many of the projects under his agrarian reforms. His administration expanded the number of the zemstvos from 34 to 43. A new electoral law resulted in 30% of the legislators of the third and fourth Duma coming from the zemstvos. In the period leading up the 1905 Revolution, and throughout Stolypin's governance, the style of debate among zemstvo gentry changed; what began as consensus building and doing favors for friends and family turned into partisan parliamentary politics more typical of 20th century governance.

The All-Russian Zemstvo Union was set up in August 1914 to provide a common voice for all the zemstvos. It was a liberal organisation, which after 1915 operated in conjunction with the Union of Cities.

During the Russian Revolution, the zemstvos lost all authority and the only real authority remaining in Russia rested with the soviets. The zemstvo elections were boycotted because the people considered the soviets as the authority. Many of the third element, the administrators, stopped showing up to their zemstvo-appointed positions and worked for the soviets instead. After the October Revolution, the uniform system of zemstvos was dissolved. In some places, such as Ukraine, the institution remained and took on more nationalist forms.

== Jurisdiction ==
Zemstvos were originally restricted from making rules that were binding on every citizen within their jurisdiction. In 1873, zemstvos were permitted to make regulations binding on every citizen only for the purpose of preventing fires. These powers were expanded in 1879 to allow regulations to prevent the spread of epidemics and zoological diseases.

As time went on, additional gubernatorial oversight was imposed on the zemstvos. In 1867, the zemstvos were prevented from publishing minutes or debates unless given specific permission by the governor. In 1879, the governors were given the power to dismiss, at their discretion, any zemstvo employee. The greatest single change in the zemstvos' powers came under Alexander III's law of 25 June [O.S. 13 June] 1890. The 1890 law instituted the Bureau of Zemstvo Affairs as additional oversight. Bureau officials were appointed by the emperor, and from local government officials such as Marshall of the Nobility, district prosecutor, and district courts. The bureau overturned 116 zemstvo enactments from 1891 to 1892, with 51 of these enactments being from the Vladimir Provincial Assembly alone.

The 1890 reforms also gave zemstvos the power to issue regulations on a wide variety of issues that were binding on all citizens outside of townships. In return, citizens gained the right to appeal the zemstvo's enactments to the Senate. In the 15 years that followed, the Senate heard 226 of these appeals, which primarily involved tax disputes. The reforms changed the legal status of men serving on the zemstvo, from that of private citizen to government official. Zemstvo officials could enforce these regulations by bringing violators before criminal courts. Prior to 1890, zemstvo sessions were often cut short due to assemblies' not having a quorum. This was in part because officials were not allowed to receive a salary or other compensation.

From 1897 to 1899, the issue of eliminating the district zemstvos and centralizing all functionality within the provincial zemstvo was seriously debated. This debate was especially significant in Moscow where Dmitry Shipov, chairman of the provincial zemstvo, resigned in protest to bring attention to the debate.

In 1902, zemstvo leaders petitioned Nicholas II for the zemstvo to be able to appeal to him, which the emperor refused. The Minister of Interior expressly forbade zemstvo officials from Tver from contacting other provinces on any issue of national politics.

== Zemstvo assembly ==
The main body of the zemtsvo was the assembly, whose members were elected. The assembly generally met once a year to address its docket and to appoint deputies to carry out orders given in response to issues the zemstvo had considered.

Alexander II's 1864 decree established 33 provincial zemstvos corresponding to existing governorships. Each provincial governorship was divided into several districts with each district having its own district zemstvo. The law creating the zemstvos outlined 14 objectives for each zemstvo to accomplish.

1. Management of zemstvo property and revenue
2. Maintenance of zemstvo property
3. Public food security
4. Management of philanthropy, public welfare, and maintenance of church buildings
5. Mutual property insurance
6. Oversight of the development of trade and industry
7. Economic oversight of public education, public health, and prison systems
8. Facilitating cooperation in preventing of bovine disease and crop plagues
9. Fulfillment of civil, military, and postal demands
10. Distribution of state tax funds disbursed to the zemstvo
11. Setting, collecting, and allocating local taxes
12. Notifying the public of local welfare opportunities and civil rights
13. Hold elections
14. Special charters

=== Elections ===
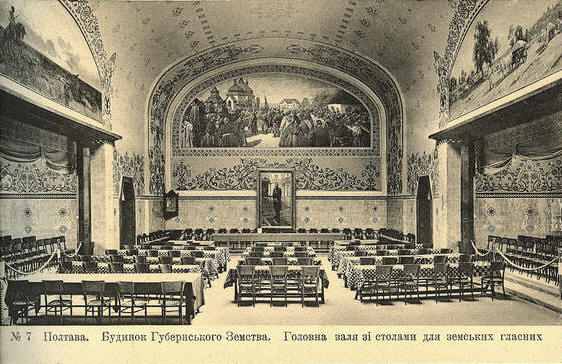
This early 1900s photo of the Poltava zemstvo building shows the architecture, seating, and wall art commissioned by the zemstvo

The zemtsvo consisted of a representative council (zemskoye sobranye) and an executive board (zemskaya uprava) nominated by the former. The members of the board consisted of five groups:

- large landed proprietors (nobles owning at least 590 acres or 2.4 square kilometres), who sat in person
- proxies of the small landowners, including the clergy in their capacity as landed proprietors
- proxies of the wealthier townsmen
- proxies of the less wealthy urban classes
- proxies of the peasants, elected by the volosts (Note: By the law of 12 (25) June 1890 the peasant members of the zemstvos were to be nominated by the governor of the province or from a list elected by the volosts.)

The nobles had more weight in voting even though they constituted a tiny minority of the population. District zemstvos were required to have 40% of their assembly elected by the peasants, but provincial assemblies were elected from the district without such a quota. This resulted in much lower peasant representation at the provincial level.

Alexander III's 1890 reforms expanded the nobility's representation in the zemstvos, from 55% in 1886 to 72% by 1903. Some historians represent the inequality in terms of the amount of land one member of the zemstvo represented. In 1877, each peasant assembly member represented 1.76 times the land a noble member represented. By 1905, each peasant assembly member represented 6.47 times the land a noble member represented.

Persons under 25 years of age, under criminal investigation, convicted criminals, and foreigners were not permitted to be in a zemstvo. Women who owned sufficient property to gain a seat on a zemstvo could appoint a male proxy to vote for them. By 1913, 20–40% of the eligible voters in Tula Oblast were women. Women were de facto denied the right to serve as deputies with this being confirmed de jure in 1903.

Prior to each election, lists of eligible voters for a given zemstvo were published for public comment. Voters could be stricken by the zemstvo or added to the roster, based on public comment. Voters had to be present to vote in person for candidates who were self-nominated. The electoral bodies were not allowed to give instructions on how candidates should act once elected. The governor could object to the proceedings and suspend electoral decisions. Election reform in 1890 resulted in separate electoral bodies for the noble and common voters. At this time, the clergy, Jews, and non-landowning peasants were deprived of the right to vote in zemstvo elections. Part of the motivation for the election reform was a decline in land ownership by the nobles, which resulted in too few nobles to fill the assembly and deputy roles. These election reforms decreased the size of assemblies and number of deputies by 20–30%.

In 1906, each zemstvo was able to elect one deputy to represent them in the State Council. Absenteeism increased dramatically during this period and many zemstvos were considered to be well attended if half their members showed up to meetings.

=== Procedure ===
Zemstvo assemblies met at least once a year for not more than twenty days. Extraordinary meetings of a zemstvo required permission from the Minister of the Interior and such meetings could only consider the issues specified by the Minister. Provincial meetings were opened and closed by the local governor, while the district meetings were opened and closed by the local Marshal of the Nobility. These zemstvos typically created a small number of delegations for handling the assembly's decisions. One such delegation was an executive board that worked all year. It was not uncommon for one individual to serve as the Marshal of the Nobility and chairman of the executive board for a number of years.

Enactments of the zemstvos generally needed approval from the governor or Minister of the Interior. These approvals could be withheld on the grounds that an enactment was either illegal or against state interests. In the case that enactments were not approved, governors were expected to notify the assembly and suggest modifications to the enactment that would allow it to pass. If compromise could not be found, the Senate would hear the case. The governor was expected to act as a plaintiff and prove that the zemstvo's enactment was unjust. The governor could, after an enactment had taken effect, revoke their approval. After 1890, with expanded oversight powers, the Ministry of Interior began to consistently obstruct the work of provincial zemstvos.

== Officials ==
From 1864 to 1889, zemstvos elected the justices of the peace. Following this period the position of zemskii nachalnik (zemstvo chief) was created. The zemskii nachalnik was appointed by the local nobility, but the zemstvo was required to pay his salary. This was unpopular with the zemstvo. The assembly tried to lower the salary, which became the subject of several lawsuits in the Senate. From 1866 to 1905, zemstvo officials were largely prevented from making contracts with each other on the ground that zemstvos were local organizations. Occasional exemptions were made for fire reinsurance contracts or large agricultural machinery sales.

== Third element ==
The zemstvo executive boards were involved in administering the staff working for the zemstvo. These staff were professional experts from the intelligentsia, known as the "third element". These professionals profited from the employment, but they also donated their time. These professionals were medical staff, educational staff, agronomists, and statisticians. The third element was a source of the central government's distrust of the zemstvos. Unlike the zemstvo administrators (first element) and deputies (second element), the third element often came from the peasant class. For this, they were suspected of being liberal radicals (as some were), which resulted in their persecution by the police.

The term "third element" was coined by Vice-governor Vladimir Kondoidi in 1900, to refer to radical zemstvo employees in Samara. He charged that the third element had largely taken control of the actual operations of the zemstvo.

The zemstvo board has no choice but to rely exclusively on the third element, since there is no participation in the assembly at all. In this regard, the upcoming session terrifies me.

— Dmitrii Shipov, private letter (1902)

The governor of Samara subsequently led an investigation that discovered that over half of the zemstvo employees never had their applications submitted to the governor for approval, as required by law.

== Taxation ==
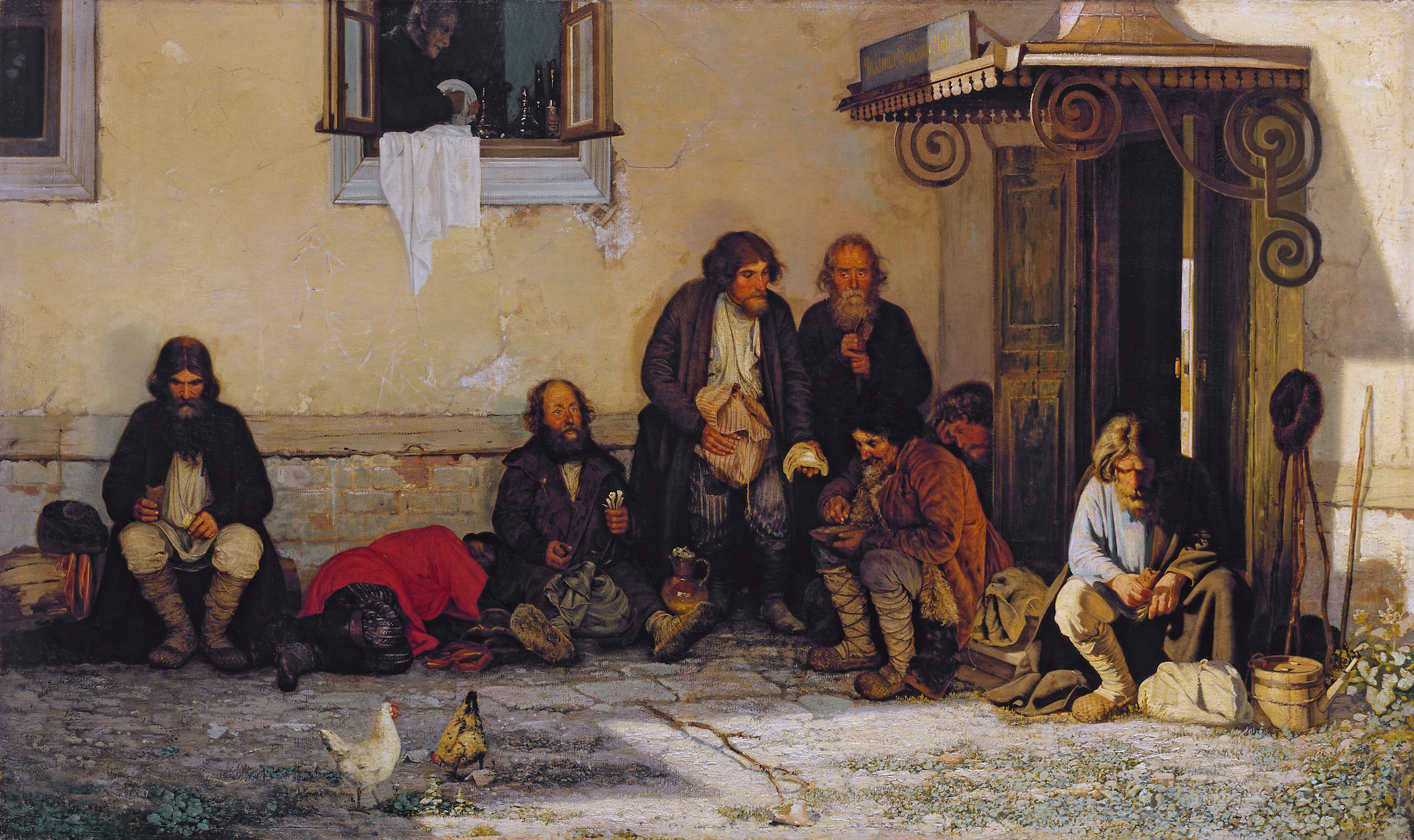
The Zemstvo Dines by Grigoriy Myasoyedov. 1872. It depicts the poorer, peasant part of zemstvo

The 10th objective, distribution of state funds assigned to them, was one of the zemstvos' main functions. About 20% of Russia's annual state revenue was assigned to the zemstvos in the early years. Zemstvos received tax revenue from a variety of other sources and for a variety of purposes. It is difficult to summarize a typical zemstvo's taxation policy. For example, land tax accounted for between 3 and 90 percent of a zemstvo's revenue, depending on the zemstvo and the year. In many districts, police were to collect harvest taxes on behalf of the zemstvo. However, there was significant difficulty in actually collecting such taxes because the zemstvo had no control over the police, and the assemblies were forbidden from rewarding the police, including even thanking them. In 1866, the Senate ruled that zemstvos were not allowed to tax industrial output.

The original zemstvo charter identified the "value and income of the taxable property" as the sole basis on which to determine tax burden. However, there was no established method for determining the value of property. Zemstvos addressed this problem at the local level by creating a cadastre. The 1893 tax reform, clarified that zemstvos were expected to tax land based on its productivity with different standards for forests and farms as well as soil type. In 1894, the Ministry of Finance specified that zemstvos should collect statistical data to form a rational basis for their taxation policy.

In the beginning of the zemstvo system, natural obligations, such as an obligation to do road work and in-kind taxes such as in wheat, were of greater concern to the peasants than monetary taxation. These taxes accounted for a large part of the zemstvo's resources but were unpopular. Over time, these were mostly converted into monetary taxes. This policy was also not popular, as the zemstvos were often seen by contemporary peasants as worthless institutions that raised a lot of taxes.

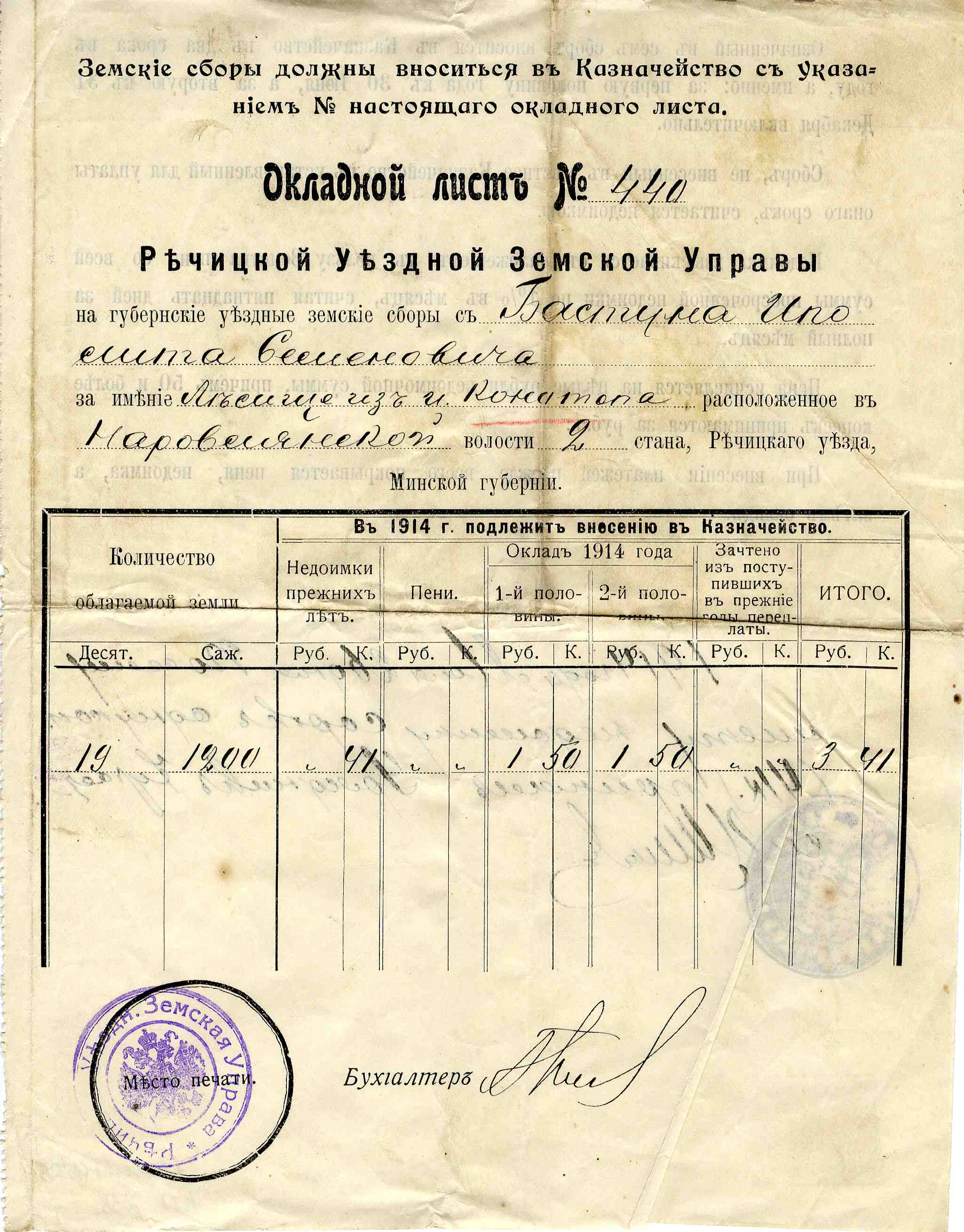
Zemstvo tax assessment notice from Rechytsa district, 1914

Zemstvo expenditure grew from 89.1 million rubles in 1900 to 290.5 million rubles in 1913. Of the latter sum, 90.1 million rubles were spent on education, 71.4 million on medical assistance, 22.2 million on improvements to agriculture, and 8 million on veterinary measures. The chief sources of zemstvo revenue were taxes on lands, forests, country dwellings, factories, mines, and other real estate.

The participants of the Russian Revolution of 1905 were largely zemstvo participants as well. In 1905–6, 66 districts boycotted paying taxes they thought too high. Discontent was most severe where the zemstvo's tax on land allotted to the peasants was taxed much higher than privately owned land. Notable participants in the 1905 revolution affiliated with the zemstvos include Dmitry Shipov, Dmitry Shakhovskoy, Georgy Lvov, Pavel Dolgorukov, and Fedor Redichev. Several of these men were also members of Beseda: a clandestine organization for liberals to discuss the issues of the zemstvo.

In 1917 rural societies in Stavropol refused to pay taxes and boycotted schools, medical centers, and all other services after the zemstvo was first introduced there. Rising tensions resulted in three protesters being killed by the police and with the zemstvo remaining in power. The governor reported:

The dissatisfaction of the rural population with the introduction of the zemstvo was evident almost everywhere in the province shortly after the distribution of the tax lists. The peasants, being insufficiently informed about the taxes and the sphere of activity of zemtsvo institutions which were only in their first year of existence, noticed the exceptional increase in local taxes.

== Education ==
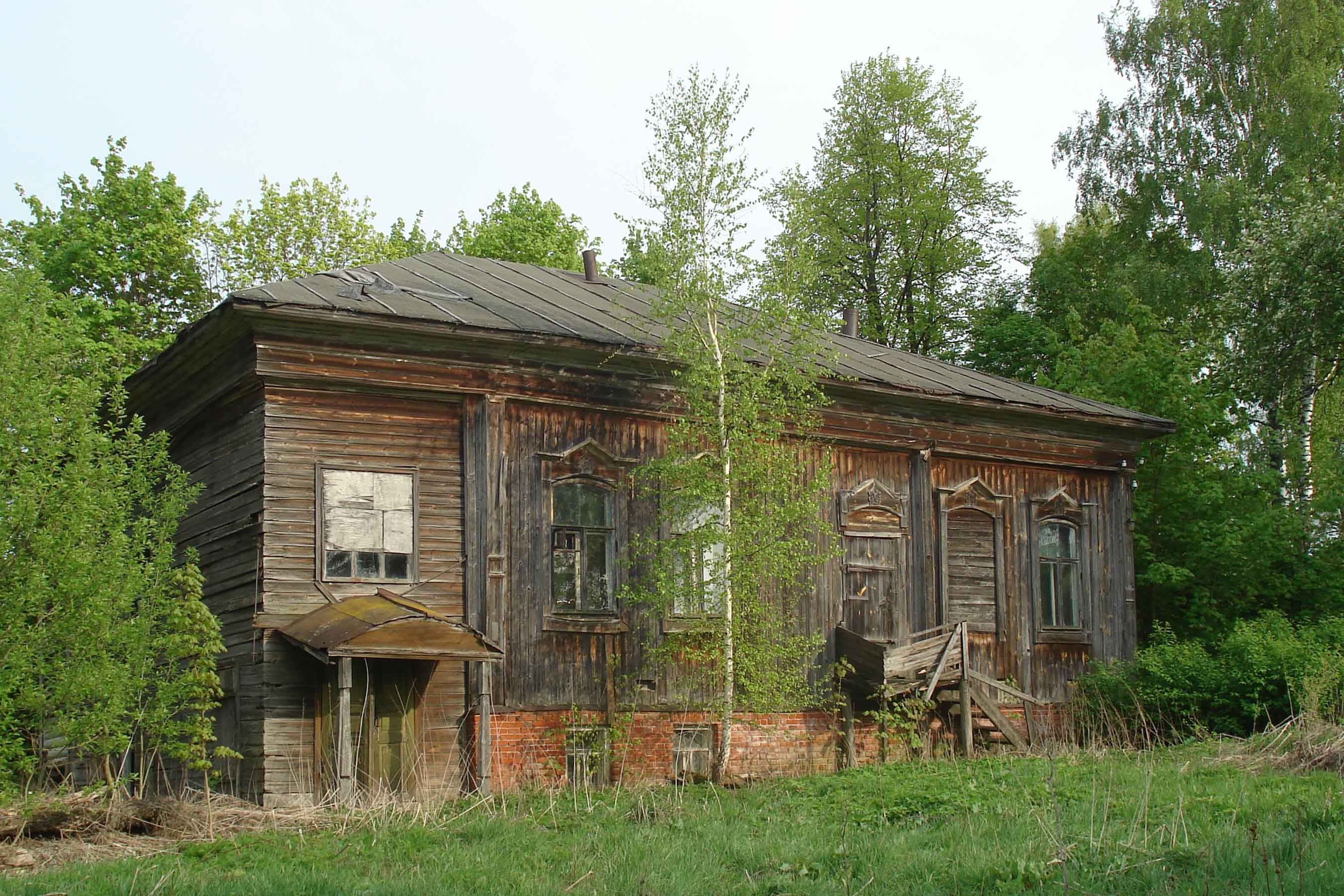
The building of the former zemstvo primary school in Krasno, Russia

The zemstvo educational system was built on the existing peasant and clerical educational systems administered by the Holy Synod. Prior to 1870, peasant communities were required to provide educational facilities, and the zemstvos did not reliably pay teachers. In the 1870s, zemstvos began to provide reliable salaries and additional materials, such as blackboards. The shift from these schools being funded by the peasant communities to being included in zemstvo budgets took several decades. The zemstvos did not reach budget parity with the local peasant communities until 1889. Afterwards, zemstvo budgets rapidly expanded, and education became the largest share of those budgets. In 1893, the total zemstvo expenditure on education was 9 million rubles; in 1913, it was nearly 90 million rubles.

Beginning in 1886 and continuing throughout the existence of the zemstvos, the central bureaucracy sought additional control over primary education. This started with special school inspections that could result in the closing of unsatisfactory schools. The Marshall of Nobility was given special privileges—such as conducting school inspections, having sole authority to open new schools, and chairing school boards—by the 1874 primary school legislation, but these privileges did not have a large effect on schools, because most zemstvos never ceded financial control over the schools to the school boards and many of the supposed inspections simply never occurred. Peasants mostly supported zemstvo schools, over existing schools created by the crown or clergy. The number of synod-administrated schools fell from 24,000 in 1886 to 4,000 by 1880.

Students of zemstvo schools could be subjected to year-end examinations at the zemstvo's discretion. Pass rates for these exams were used to evaluate teacher performance, and less military service was required of male students who passed.

Zemstvo teachers came mostly from the middle class. There was a mix of male and female teachers, with a tendency to have more females. Teachers were united by low pay, isolation in communities unfamiliar to them, and being unmarried. There were 17% female, and 47% male, married teachers in 1911. A lack of qualified teachers could create a catch-22 in which communities would not want to fund the construction of a school, but teachers would not move to a community with no school.

The first formal curriculum for zemstvo schooling was created by the Ministry of Education in 1897. This program prescribed a weekly six hours' study of the Word of God, three hours of Slavonic Church, eight hours of Russian language, two hours of writing, and five hours of arithmetic. Choir was a popular way to boost scholastic engagement. Nearly every other form of education received criticism, but teaching students to read the lyrics and memorize the tones of church songs was encouraged by all.

Literacy rose from 10% to 68% during the existence of the zemstvo system. However, a significant portion of the new middle class was taught via private tutors or during military service.

In 1907, the Duma created a fund to establish a school in every village in Russia. These funds were disbursed through the zemstvos to existing schools, or were given to school curators, which often resulted in the construction of new schools. Under the school curators arose a new class of "state schools" which were not affiliated with the zemstvos. In 1910, the Ministry of Education created a national pension fund that all teachers could participate in. Additional administrative action in 1913 caused the existing zemstvo schools to come more under the influence of the Ministry of Education than the zemstvos themselves. In 1914, zemstvos lost the power to direct school teachers and the ministry gained the power to fire any school teachers they deemed as unfit.

== Medicine ==
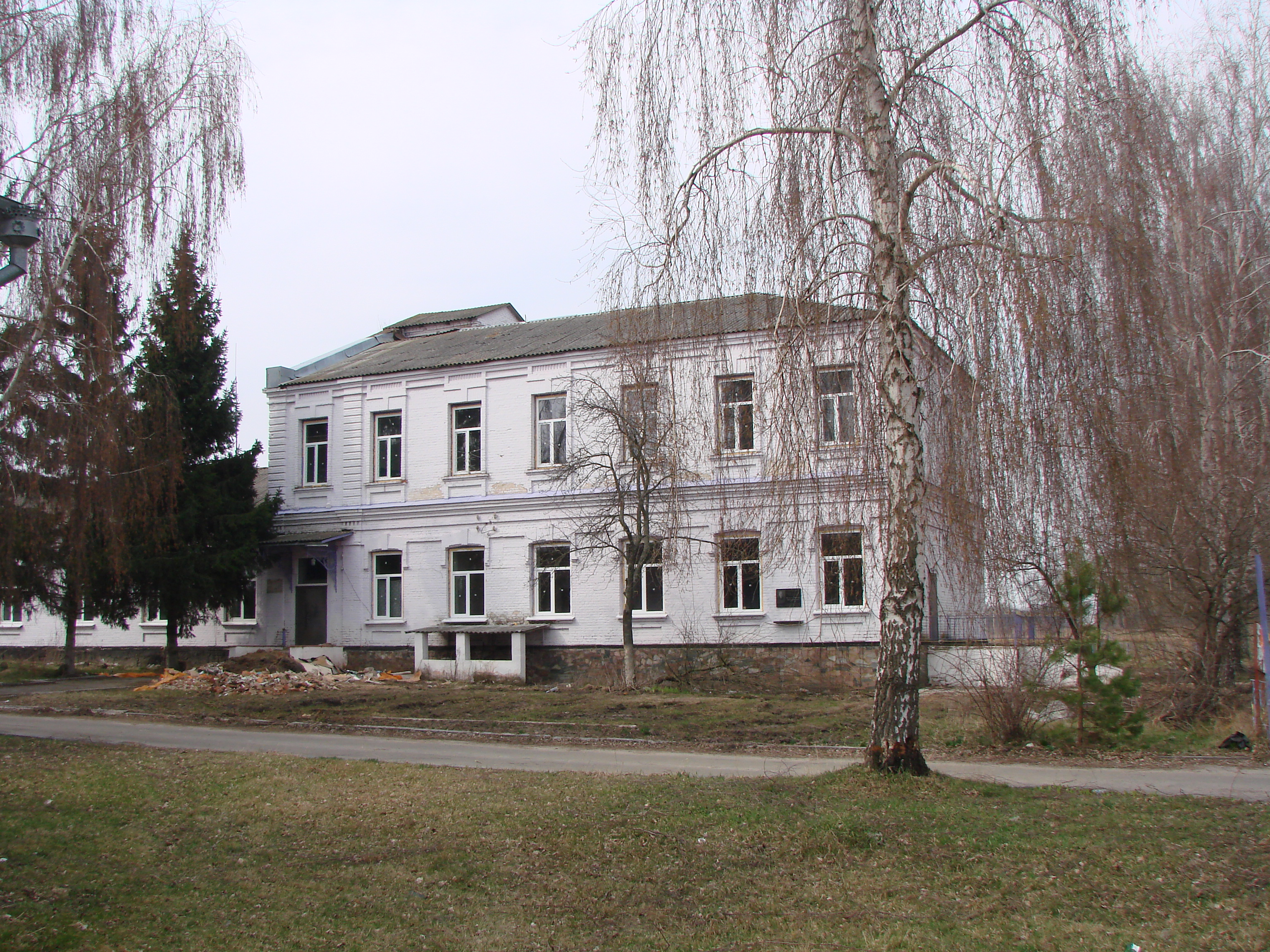
A zemstvo hospital in Brusyliv, Zhytomyr Oblast

Prior to the zemstvo medical system, Russian peasants mostly relied on faith healers, who specialized in magical chants and folk remedies, for their medical care. The zemstvos viewed providing increased support for medical systems as their most important task. Therefore, the zemstvo medical system became as much a popular movement for supporting an ideal as an actual service. To accomplish this, the zemstvos promoted policies that limited the direct costs to peasants of their medical care and aimed to compensate providers through tax funds. The medical experts supported by the zemstvos focused on education in hygiene and preventive medicine. The zemstvo officials and practitioners appreciated the difficulty of not only of making illiterate, god-fearing peasants trust a largely secular medical system based on rational analysis, but of making them understand that distinction at all.

The growth of the medical system was slow and depended on the growth of the third element. The first zemstvo bureaucracies for managing the various salaried positions connected with the zemstvo did not emerge until the 1870s. Growing numbers of salaried workers inevitably led to growing budgets. At several points in the early zemstvo period, budget concerns led to the laying off of practitioners. By 1910, nearly all districts had a physician–patient ratio worse than 1 to 10,000.

Practitioners suffered from a lack of trust on the zemstvos' part. Recommendations such as funding for hospital improvements would be weighed against ideas from the assembly itself. Practitioners made several attempts to form a national organization for the advancement of medicine, but its implementation was delayed until 1885. One of the goals this national system would achieve was uniform medical records to facilitate analyzing cases from other provinces. Practitioners also demanded changing from the circuit system, where they spent most of their time traveling to each remote village to see patients, to a stationary system, where practitioners held regular hours at a medical center. Zemstvos opposed the stationary system throughout the 1870s on the grounds that remote villagers, who paid taxes towards the medical service, would not receive equal access. In the 1880s, the stationary system became more popular as the number of practitioners grew.

As the circuit system faded away, the zemstvos engaged in heated debates over what to do with the feldshers, who filled the gap between the ideal medical care the zemstvo system sought and the practical limitations of what could be provided. Restrictions were placed on feldshers, such that much of their day-to-day job became technically illegal, but there was no one else to provide medical care. This was widely known and tolerated by all, but the increasing criminalization of the feldsher's work symbolized what the zemstvo medical system still needed to achieve. One reason for the zemstvos' opposition was that feldshers blurred the lines between the traditional spiritual medicine and modern medicine. Rather than fading away, the feldsher practice was opened to women in 1871 to meet growing demands. Alongside growing numbers of feldshers was an increasing professionalism on their part through more formal training as physician assistants.

Sanitary councils began meeting in the 1870s, but were not effective until after 1879 when zemstvos gained the power to issue sanitary legislation binding on all citizens. Moscow was a particular leader in the development of sanitary councils and then a full-time bureau of sanitation professionals.

Midwifery was a contemporaneously known issue during the zemstvo period because nearly one-in-two peasant children did not reach adulthood. This is a notable area in which the zemstvos failed. At the peak of midwifery during the zemstvo system, only 2% of births were attended. The primary cause of this failure was peasant women did not want strangers involved in their deliveries.

== Sources ==
- Vucinich, Wayne; Emmons, Terence (1982). The Zemstvo in Russia: an experiment in local self-government. Cambridge; New York: Cambridge University Press. ISBN 0521234166.
- Figes, Orlando. A People's Tragedy: The Russian Revolution 1891–1924. London: The Bodley Head. ISBN 9781847922915.
