= Khrystyna Sushko =

Ukrainian Institute of National Memory poster of Sushko.

Khrystyna Yevhenivna Sushko (Ukrainian: Христина Євгенівна Сушко, before her second marriage known as Princess Christina Trubetskaya-Dolgorukaya; 9 September 1894 - 7 February 1967) was a Ukrainian military doctor and a lieutenant in the Army of the Ukrainian People's Republic. She was the only female officer in the army of the Ukrainian People's Republic.

== Biography ==
=== Early life ===
Khrystyna Sushko was born in Kyiv to Prince Evgenii Troubetzkoy. After graduating from a classical gymnasium, she then studied at the medical faculty of Moscow University from 1914 onwards. She knew several foreign languages (German, French, Polish) as well as Ukrainian and Russian.

On the outbreak of World War I she went to work as a nurse in a military hospital on the Southwestern Front. At the front she met Prince Nikolai Dolgoruky, a Russian army general from the House of Dolgorukov, whom she married in spring 1915. On 26 March 1917 she gave birth to their daughter, Svetlana, which ended her service in the Russian Imperial Army.

After the October Revolution she fled to Kyiv with Svetlana, where they were personally cared for by Symon Petliura - he was familiar with the Dolgoruky family from his time as a journalist in Moscow. In order to hide the fact that she had married into a Russian aristocratic family, Petliura suggested she take on a fictitious surname - Skachkivska.

=== Independence ===
Whilst in the Ukrainian People's Army (UPA) she again worked in a military hospital from early 1918 onwards and later - as a military doctor - she joined the Sich Riflemen Corps. There she met Colonel Roman Sushko, who she later married.

On 5 June 1919, during heavy fighting near the village of Mala Salikha (Puzyrki village, between Starokostyantyniv and Shepetivka), she was captured by the Bolsheviks. They tortured her but she managed to escape on the roof of a train crowded with Bolsheviks and get back to the Ukrainian forces, where she passed on information about the location of the Bolshevik units to the high command.

On 10 July 1919 Khrystyna was wounded in the right hand by two machine-gun bullets but stayed in the army. In August of the same year, in a battle near the village of Velyka Salikha, she was seriously wounded and paralysed down her right side. She was treated in 1920, gave birth to her second daughter Romanna and returned to the army.

After treatment in 1920, she gave birth to her second daughter Romanna and returned to the ranks of the UPA Army. By order of the commander of the 6th Sich Rifle Infantry Division of the UPA, Colonel Marko Bezruchko, she was appointed a doctor in that division's 46th kuren (the kuren commanded by her husband).

In April the Division fought on the Bolshevik front. In June 1920, Sushko was seriously wounded in the abdomen and spine in the battle of Perga (now in Korosten Raion). Treating such severe wounds was expensive and she was only able to raise enough money thanks to help from Petliura. In a resolution on allocating funds for treatment abroad, Petliura wrote:

Doctor Sushko distinguished herself during the struggle for Ukrainian independence with complete devotion to the cause and remarkable heroism, and therefore the allocation of 35,000 [Polish] marks fulfils the duty of the state and its authorities towards one of its best daughters. I approve the amount of the allocation.

=== Internment ===
After the UPA's final retreat to Poland in 1922-1923, Khrystyna Sushko continued to serve as divisional doctor in the Szczypiorno camp near Kalisz. During this period she began to participate in the "Union of Military Invalids in the Szczypiorno Internee Camp", which had been founded in April 1922.

In July 1922 the central board of the All-Ukrainian Union of Military Invalids made Sushko representative for the military invalids in Kalisz and Szczypiorno and soon she was elected chairperson of that camp's Union of Invalids. An 'Invalids' House' was opened to house sixty patients, largely due to her efforts.

Her services to the UPA led the registration committee under General-Coroner Mykola Yanchevsky every reason to recommend she be enrolled "into active military service at the rank of sanitary lieutenant with seniority… [and] with the right to further promotion in rank”. This confirmed her status as the only female officer in the UPA.

However, conditions in the camp weakened her health and by early 1923 she was unable to use her legs and had to move about on crutches. Her husband also secretly left for Czechoslovakia to study law at university and then to take an active part in the Ukrainian People's Liberation Army and then the Organisation of Ukrainian Nationalists. They ultimately split up in 1925.

In August 1924 the camps were dissolved and for a time she remained in Stanytsia, which was established on the former camp's footprint - with her disability she qualified to live there. She left for treatment in Warsaw in October that year and in April 1925 a regular medical examination in Warsaw revealed "damage to both lower limbs and one upper limb from gunshot wounds" and she was recommended for treatment abroad.

=== Later life ===
After treatment in Europe she regained full use of her limbs. She and her children moved to Italy, where she enrolled in the University of Rome and graduated in cardiology. She married an Italian physician with the surname Mangeri around 1927 and settled on his estate in Taormina in Sicily. They later divorced and she moved with her daughters again, this time to Nice in France, where she set up her own medical practice. She also maintained active ties with Ukrainian émigrés and veterans in Europe. In 1932, she met Yevhen Konovalets, leader of the OUN.

Nothing is known of her during the Second World War until 1945, when she was recorded as working in a US Army medical officer's uniform in the American occupation zone in Germany under the name Christiana Mangeri. There she headed the medical service in the camps for displaced persons in Mannheim, Würzburg, Leipheim, Dillingen and Günzburg, where the vast majority of Ukrainians were being held. That work ended when Germany began closing these camps in 1950. Soon after that she moved to Switzerland permanently, dying in Geneva.

== Legacy ==
A street in Kyiv is named after Sushko, whilst провулок Уляни Громової (Ulyana Gromova Lane) in Kropyvnytskyi has been renamed провулок Христини Сушко (Khrystyna Sushko Lane).

In August 2026 the Ukrainian Institute of National Remembrance announced that the tombstone of Sushko's grave in Geneva had "disappeared" and that her resting place was being prepared for some else's grave.
