= Det lysande ögat =

2005 book by Laura Trenter

Det lysande ögat ("The Shining Eye") is a Swedish children's detective novel of 2005 written by Laura Trenter and Tony Manieri. It is the first book in the series "Nadja and Charlie, Detective Duo", and is followed by Stackelstrands hemlighet ("The Secret of Stackel Beach").

== Plot ==
There is a mystery with the new archeologist of the museum, why he is so interesting about the shipwreck which sank? Is it haunting in the mill? Later Charlie's and Nadja's classmate Jackie disappears and they find one of her shoes at the beach.

== References and sources ==
- Det lysande ögat on bokia.se
