= Dmitry Shakhovskoy =

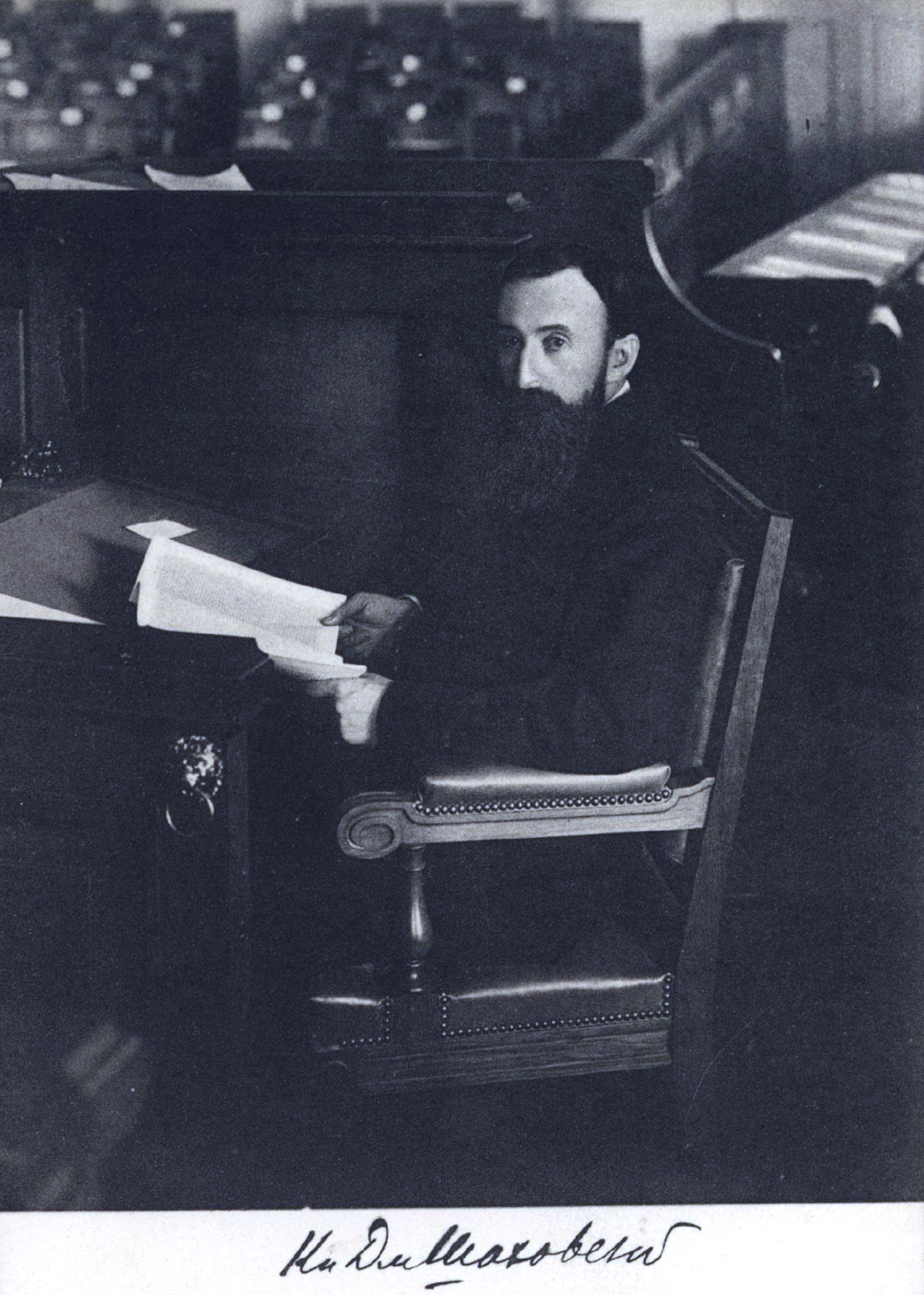
Dmitry Ivanovich Shakhovskoy

Prince Dmitry Ivanovich Shakhovskoy (Russian: Дми́трий Ива́нович Шаховско́й; 1861, Tsarskoye Selo – 1939, Moscow) was a Russian liberal politician.

== Life ==
Active participant in zemstvo congresses, 1904–1905; one of the organizers of the Union of Liberation.

One of the founders of Beseda and permanent member of the Central Committee of the Constitutional Democratic Party. Member and secretary of the Cadet group in the First State Duma (Russian Empire).

In May–July 1917 he was Minister of Social Welfare in the Russian Provisional Government.

After the Bolshevik revolution he was active in Soviet cooperative institutions, 1930. He was arrested by the NKVD and executed on 15 April 1939.
