= Nikolai Trubetzkoy =

Russian linguist and historian

Prince Nikolai Trubetzkoy
- Николай Трубецкой
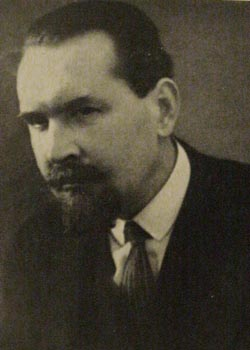
- Trubetzkoy in the 1920s
- Born: 16 April 1890; Moscow, Russian Empire (present-day Russia)
- Died: 25 June 1938 (aged 48); Vienna, State of Austria, Nazi Germany (present-day Austria)
- Occupations: Linguist; historian
- Movement: Eurasianism
- Father: Sergei Nikolaevich Trubetskoy
- Relatives: Nikolai Petrovitch Troubetzkoy (grandfather); Evgenii Nikolaevitch Troubetzkoy (uncle)
- Family: Trubetskoy

Academic background
- Education: Imperial Moscow University (1913)

Academic work
- Discipline: Linguistics
- Sub-discipline: Phonology; Slavic philology
- School or tradition: Prague School
- Institutions: Imperial Moscow University; University of Rostov-on-Don; University of Sofia; University of Vienna
- Main interests: Structural linguistics; morphophonology
- Notable works: Principles of Phonology
- Notable ideas: Phoneme; sprachbund

Prince Nikolai Sergeyevich Trubetzkoy (Note: Also transliterated as Troubetskoy or Trubetskoy.) (Russian: Николай Сергеевич Трубецкой [nʲɪkɐˈlaj sʲɪrˈɡʲe(j)ɪvʲɪtɕ trʊbʲɪtsˈkoj]; 16 April 1890 – 25 June 1938) was a Russian linguist and historian whose teachings formed a nucleus of the Prague School of structural linguistics. He is widely considered to be the founder of morphophonology. He was also associated with the Russian Eurasianists.

== Life and career ==
Trubetzkoy was born into privilege. His father, Sergei Nikolaevich Trubetskoy, came from the Lithuanian Gediminid princely family of Trubetskoy. In 1908, he enrolled at the Imperial Moscow University. While spending some time at the University of Leipzig, Trubetzkoy was taught by August Leskien, a pioneer of research into sound laws.

After he graduated from the Moscow University (1913), Trubetzkoy delivered lectures there until the Russian Revolution, when he moved first to the University of Rostov-on-Don, then to the University of Sofia (1920–1922) and finally took the chair of Professor of Slavic Philology at the University of Vienna (1922–1938). Trubetzkoy was involved with the Eurasianist movement and became one of their leading theorists and political leaders. After the emergence of "left Eurasianism" in Paris, where some of the movement's leaders became pro-Soviet, Trubetzkoy, who was a staunch anti-communist, heavily criticised them and eventually broke with the Eurasianist movement.

Trubetzkoy died from a heart attack attributed to Nazi persecution after he had published an article that was highly critical of Hitler's theories.

== Legacy ==
Trubetzkoy's chief contributions to linguistics lie in the domain of phonology, particularly in the analyses of the phonological systems of individual languages and in the search for general and universal phonological laws. His magnum opus, Grundzüge der Phonologie (Principles of Phonology) was issued posthumously in which he defined the phoneme as the smallest distinctive unit within the structure of a given language. It was crucial in establishing phonology as a discipline separate from phonetics.

Trubetzkoy also wrote as a literary critic. In Writings on Literature, a brief collection of translated articles, he analyzed Russian literature beginning with the Old Russian epic The Tale of Igor's Campaign and proceeding to 19th-century Russian poetry and Dostoevsky.

It is sometimes hard to distinguish Trubetzkoy's views from those of his friend Roman Jakobson, who should be credited with spreading the Prague School views on phonology after Trubetzkoy's death.

=== Structuralism ===
In his biography of the mathematical collective Nicolas Bourbaki, Amir Aczel described Trubetzkoy as a pioneer in structuralism, an interdisciplinary outgrowth of structural linguistics that would be applied in mathematics by the Bourbaki group, as in the notion of a mathematical structure, and in anthropology by Claude Lévi-Strauss, who sought to describe rules governing human behavior. According to Aczel, Trubetzkoy's focus in Principles of Phonology was the study of phonemes and their opposing aspects to describe rules of language, the goal of describing general underlying rules being the common goal of structuralism.

== See also ==
- Sprachbund, a linguistic term coined by Trubetzkoy

== Sources ==
- Anderson, Stephen R. (1985). Phonology in the Twentieth Century. Theories of Rules and Theories of Representations. Chicago: The University of Chicago Press. pp. 83–116.
- Intellectual Biography of Nikolai Trubetzkoy at the Gallery of Russian Thinkers (International Society for Philosophers)
