= Beseda =

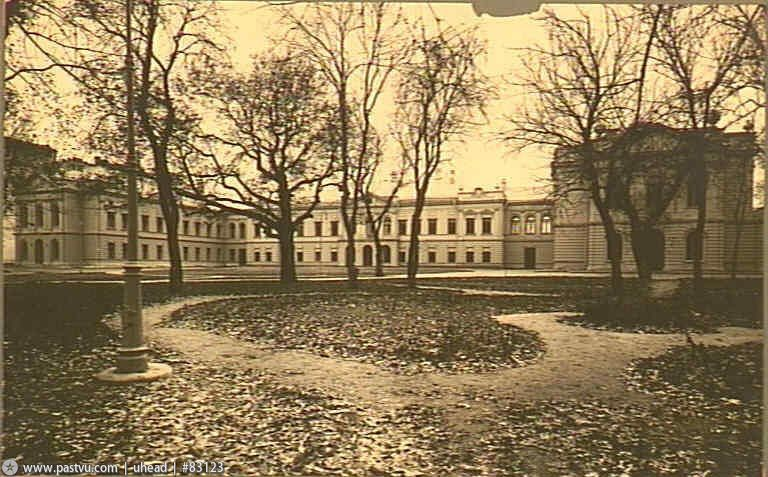
Vyazemskiy-Dolgorukiy estate (Znamenskiy lane) 3

Beseda (Russian: Беседа, IPA: [bʲɪˈsʲedə] , lit. 'debate') was a clandestine discussion circle consisting of liberal "zemstvo men", among them prominent and grand names of the Russian aristocracy. The intelligentsia discussion group was formed in the wake of resumed persecution of the zemstvos after increased liberties during the Russian famine of 1891–92.

Beseda was formed in November 1899 and gathered 3 or 4 times a year. Founders of the circle were Dmitry Shakhovskoy, Pavel Dolgorukov, and Prince Sergei Nikolaevich Trubetskoy. It gradually lost its significance and the last meeting was held in October 1905. The members, which included among others Prince Lvov, met in the palace of the Princes Dolgorukov in Moscow, and initially restricted discussion strictly to the affairs of the zemstvos. After the persecution of the zemstvos was increased in 1900, when it dismissed several hundreds of liberals from the elected zemstvo boards, the circle was forced to confront political issues and questions. In the following two years, the Beseda would become the "leading force of the Russian constitutionalists movement", with a wide spectrum of public men, from industrial magnates and slavophiles to civic leaders, supporting it, and its calls for reform. Most members joined the Constitutional Democratic Party.

The resumed persecution in 1900 had also banned Dmitry Shipov's Moscow Provincial Zemstvo Council, formed 1896 and closed shortly after, which drove him, "a reluctant revolutionary", into the circles of the radical constitutionalists.

== Bibliography ==
- Figes, Orlando. A People's Tragedy: The Russian Revolution 1891–1924. London: The Bodley Head. ISBN 9781847922915.
