= Det brinner! =

1999 novel by Laura Trenter

Det brinner! (It burns!) is a 1999 young adult novel written by Laura Trenter. In 2002 a TV series based on the novel was produced and released on DVD in 2004, starring Sofie Hamilton, Loa Falkman, Cecilia Frode, Göran Ragnerstam and Magnus Krepper.

== Plot ==
Det brinner!
- Author: Laura Trenter
- Language: Swedish
- Publisher: Norstedts Audio
- ISBN: 9-173-13101-6

Frida is best friends with Christoffer, whose father is a policeman. One day she becomes friends with a girl named Isabell, who has moved to her town. Isabell invites her to go for a smoke, to celebrate their friendship.

Suddenly, a fire starts at the deserted croft where they have been smoking. Frida and Isabell believe that it is their fault, but promise not to tell anyone. But the police find the remains of a body at the croft Isabell and Frida face a terrible dilemma, and are completely unsure how to deal with the situation.
