= Pappa polis =

2000 children's book by Laura Trenter

- Author: Laura Trenter
- Original title: Pappa polis
- Language: Swedish
- Genre: Detective fiction, Children's fiction
- Published: 2000
- Publication place: Sweden

Pappa polis is a Swedish children's novel from 2000, written by Laura Trenter. It is also available as an audiobook.

== Plot ==
This book is about an 11-year-old boy called Julian whose father is a police officer. The father is shot by a bike gang, but survives. But the criminals are going free and the fear remains. As Julian begins to investigate on his own he meets a young man from the bike gang and they become friends...
