= John Trevanion (disambiguation) =

John Trevanion (1613–1643) was an English politician.

John Trevanion may also refer to:

- John Trevanion (merchant), English merchant and mayor, briefly MP for Dartmouth in 1529
- John Trevanion (1667–1740), British politician
- John Trevanion (died 1810), British politician, MP for Dover 1774–1806

== See also ==
- John Bettesworth-Trevanion (1780–1840), Cornish politician
