= Inger Jalakas =

Swedish author and journalist (born 1951)

- Born: 15 December 1951 (age 74); Nässjö, Sweden
- Occupations: writer, journalist

Inger Marianne Elisabeth Jalakas (born 15 December 1951) is a Swedish author and journalist. She studied mathematics and Earth science at the University of Gothenburg 1975–76 and 1978–79 she studied at Journalisthögskolan i Göteborg.

== Selected bibliography ==
=== Non-fiction books ===
- 1980 – Smockor och smek: hotande läsning: om ungdomstidningar
- 1995 – Bara barn: om sexturism och slaveri
- 1997 – Jävlar anamma, mamma!: handbok i överlevnad för ensamma mammor
- 2000 – Den nyttiga nosen
- 2003 – Från utbränd till nytänd
- 2005 – Agility: från start till mål
- 2007 – Nördsyndromet: allt du behöver veta om Aspergers syndrom
- 2010 – Sex, kärlek & Aspergers syndrom: med kärleksskola för aspergare

=== Novels/short stories ===
- 1999 – Lustmord (short stories, together with Ulla Trenter)
- 2000 – Krokodilens leende
- 2004 – Svarta diamanter: elva berättelser om liv och död (anthology, together with among Carina Burman)

==== Detective novels about Margareta Nordin ====
- 2001 – Borde vetat bättre
- 2005 – Sinne utan svek
- 2006 – Den ryske mannen
- 2007 – Ur min aska
- 2009 – Hat

=== Children's books ===
- 2003 – Min modiga mormor (illustrator: Helena Bergendahl)
- 2005 – Min modiga mormor och noshörningen Nofu (illustrator: Helena Bergendahl)
- 2006 – Min modiga mormor och den dansande elefanten (illustrator: Helena Bergendahl)
