= Simone della Tosa =

Italian statesman and historian (1270–1380)

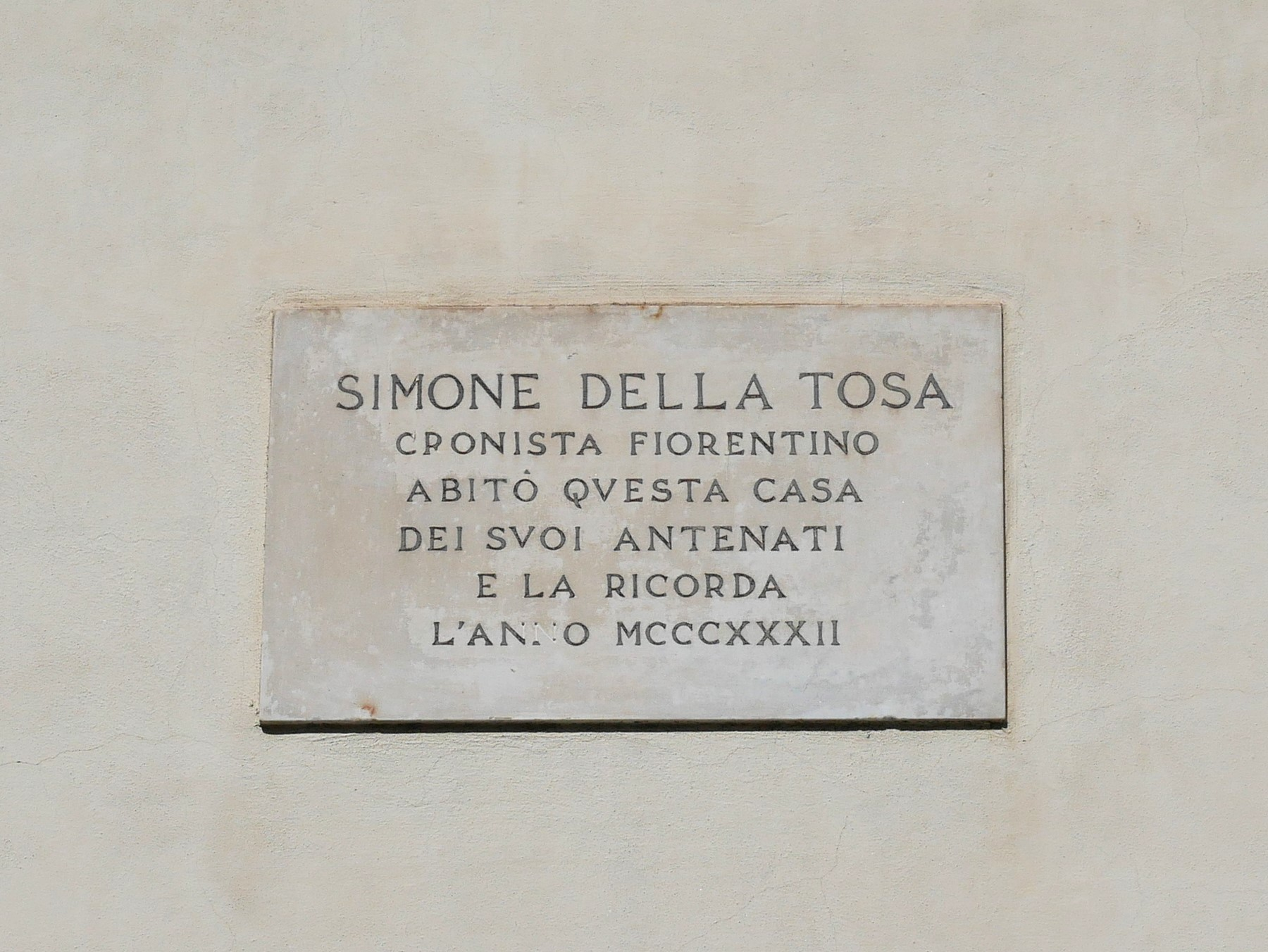
Memorial plaque

Simone della Tosa (circa 1270 – October, 1380) was an Italian statesman and historian. He is noted for writing chronicles of his native Florence, for the period from 1115 to 1379, annotated and published by Domenico Maria Manni in 1733.

In 1307 he was appointed podestà of Città di Castello and the next year, Podestà of Pistoia. In 1315, he fight along his brother Gottifredo, partisans of the Florentines and the black Guelphs in the Battle of Montecatini against victorious Uguccione Della Faggiuola and his Pisan army.

He apparently served as an emissary to the Papal Legate in Bologna in 1328. He was made Florentine ambassador to Volterra in 1329. He served the Florentine republic in various roles both civic and military.
