= William Taylor (historian) =

American historian

William "Bill" R. Taylor (1922 – June 17, 2014) was a historian, professor, and author in the United States. He is known for his interdisciplinary social history approach and for his book Cavalier & Yankee. He was pivotal in developing Stony Brook University's history department in the 1960s after he joined the program from Wisconsin.

His 1961 book Cavalier & Yankee explored the dialectic between northerners and southerners in the United States during the American Civil War era. He also edited Inventing Times Square (1992).

== Early years ==
Taylor grew up in Kansas City, Missouri, and graduated in 1939 from Shattuck School in Faribault, Minnesota, before studying at Harvard University. With World War II raging, he graduated early in February 1943 to join the Army Air Force.

At war's end he returned to his wife and son in Northampton, Massachusetts. In 1946 he accepted a position as teaching assistant at Amherst College where he helped teaching English to core curriculum freshman and sophomores under Professor Theodore Baird. After leaving in 1949 to complete his master's degree at Harvard University, he returned again to Amherst College before finally returning to Harvard in 1952 to complete his PhD under Reuben A. Brower, Cabot Professor of English, in 1957. His dissertation became the basis and one of the chapters in his first book: Cavalier and Yankee: The Old South and American National Character.

== Bibliography ==
- Cavalier and Yankee: The Old South and American National Character. published in 1961 ISBN 978-0195082845, ISBN 0195082842
