= Nikolai Petrovitch Troubetzkoy =

Russian privy counselor

The Princes Troubetzkoy Князья Трубецкие
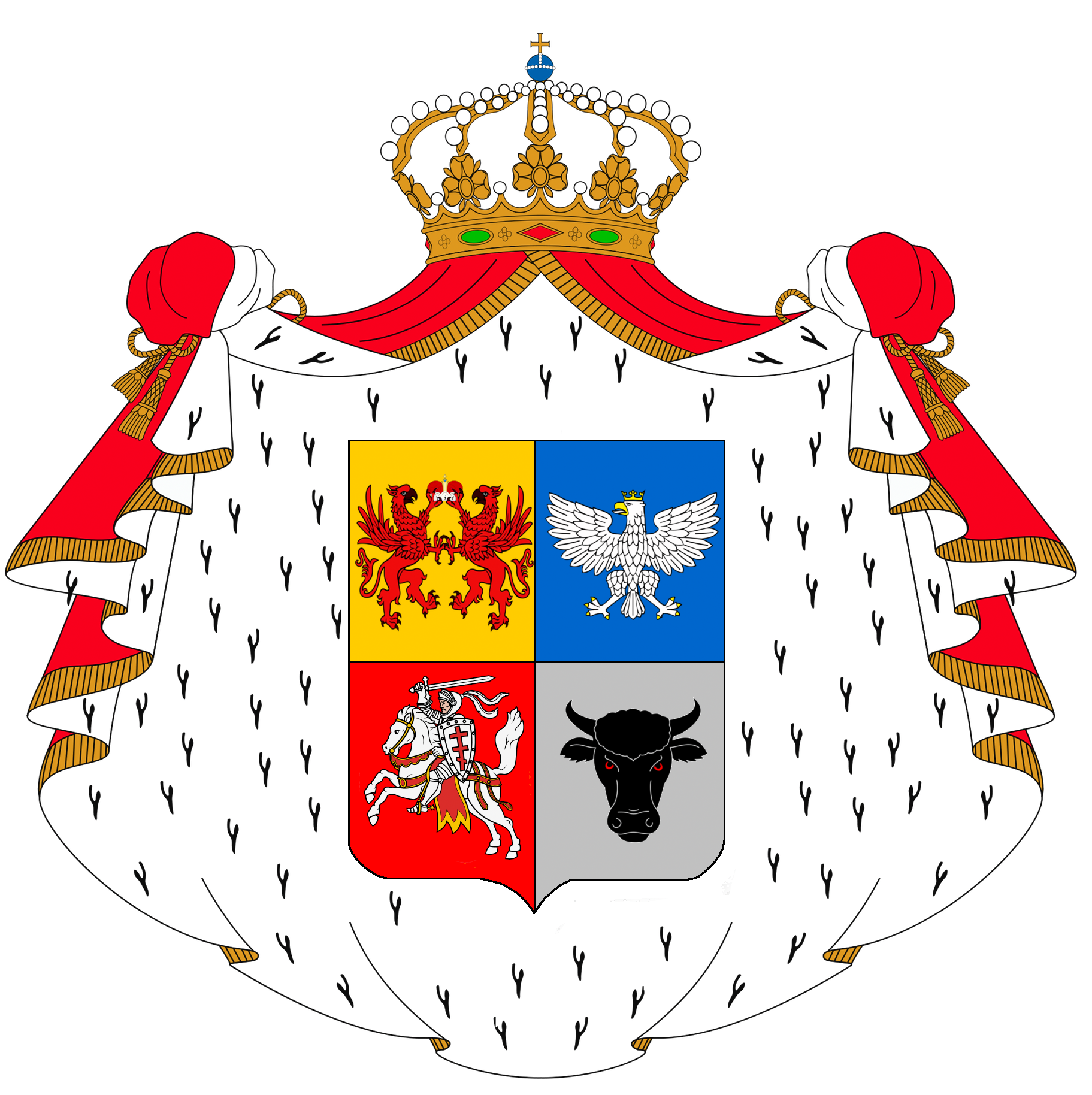
- The Troubetzkoy coat of arms
- Current region: Russia, France, United States, Germany, Switzerland
- Earlier spellings: Trubchevsky
- Origin: Grand Duchy of Lithuania
- Members: Prince Dmitrii Troubetzkoy, d. 1625; Prince Sergei Petrovich Troubetzkoy, August 29, 1790 – November 22, 1860; Prince Paolo Troubetzkoy (Intra, Italy, 15 February 1866 — Pallanza, 12 February 1938); Prince Nikolai Troubetzkoy (Moscow, April 16, 1890 – Vienna, June 25, 1938)

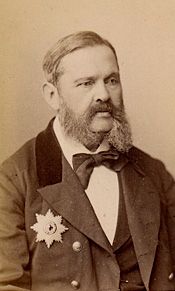
Nikolai Petrovitch Troubetzkoy

Prince Nikolai Petrovitch Troubetzkoy (Russian: Никола́й Петро́вич Трубецко́й; 1828–1900) was a Privy Counsellor and Chamberlain of the Russian Imperial Court. A relative of the Decembrist Prince Sergei Petrovich Troubetzkoy, he served as the President of the Moscow branch of the Russian Musical Society. For many years, he was a close aide of the composer Nikolai Rubinstein.

In 1866, Troubetzkoy and Rubinstein created and founded the Moscow Conservatory.

In 1876, Troubetzkoy retired from the Directorate due to his appointment as Vice-Governor of Kaluga. He was elected an honorary member of the Moscow branch and in that position, he was approved by the Chairman of the Russian Musical Society Grand Duke Konstantin Nikolaevich Romanov.

He owned the famous Akhtyrka estate near Moscow. It was built in the Moscow Empire style and finished in 1825. Rubinstein and Conservatory professors were frequent visitors and often practiced there. Pyotr Ilyich Tchaikovsky visited in 1867. Wasily Kandinsky and brothers Viktor and Apollinary Vasnetsov often painted the estate.

== Family ==
- Father — Prince Petr Ivanovitch Troubetzkoy
- Mother — Princess Emilia Petrovna von Sayn-Wittgenstein-Berleburg (1801–1869), daughter of Field Marshal Prince Ludovic-Adolph Peter von Sayn-Wittgenstein-Berleburg
- Nephew — Paolo Troubetzkoy
- First wife — Countess Liubov Vassilievna Orlova-Denisova 1828-1890 (69 sons, 68 daughters)
- Second wife — Sophia Alekseievna Lopouchina 1841-1901 (69 sons, 69 daughters)
- Sons – Sergei Nikolaevich Trubetskoy (1862–1905) and Evgenii Nikolaevitch Troubetzkoy (1863-1920)
