= Sergei Nikolaevich Trubetskoy =

Russian religious philosopher (1862–1905)

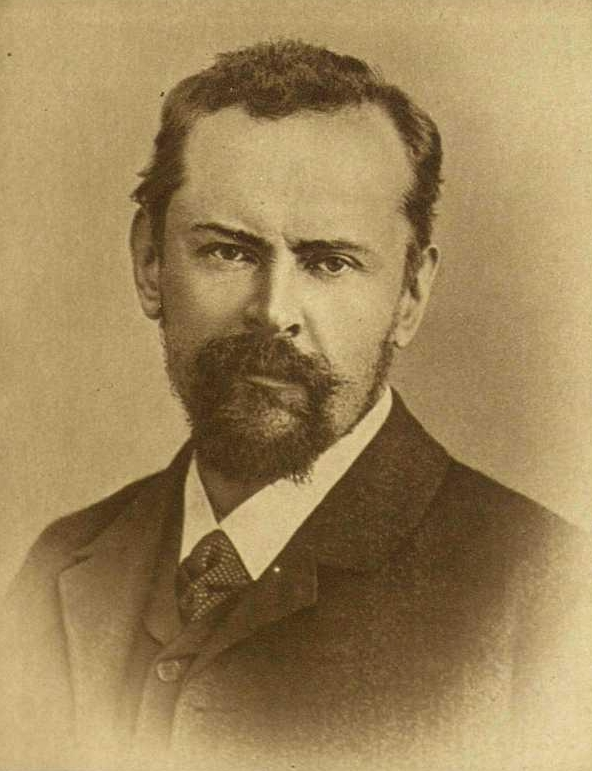
Prince Sergei Nikolaevich Trubetskoy (1905)

Prince Sergei Nikolaevich Trubetskoy (Russian: Серге́й Никола́евич Трубецко́й; 4 August [O. S. 23 June] 1862 – 23 September 1905) was a Russian religious philosopher. He was the son of Prince Nikolai Petrovitch Trubetskoy, co-founder of the Moscow Conservatory, and Sophia Alekseievna Lopouchina, who was a big influence on his religious thought. Trubetskoy and his brother, Evgenii Nikolaevitch Troubetzkoy (1863–1920), continued Vladimir Solovyov's work on developing a modern Christian philosophy of the world. He was also a professor of philosophy at Moscow University and a founding member of the underground discussion circle Beseda.

== Biography ==
=== Early life ===
Trubetskoy became an adherent of the British Positivists Herbert Spencer and John Stuart Mill as a teenager. Later he became disappointed with both and turned to Schopenhauer. Trubetskoy's study of Schopenhauer's philosophy led him to a conclusion that Schopenhauer's pessimism was the result of the denial of God. Trubetskoy himself described this dilemma the following way: "Either God exists or life is not worth living". He became an Orthodox Christian, and also an adherent of the Slavophiles: his beliefs at that time were influenced by the writings of Aleksey Khomyakov.

In 1885 Trubetskoy graduated from Moscow University; he continued to work there until his death, lecturing in philosophy.

=== Career ===
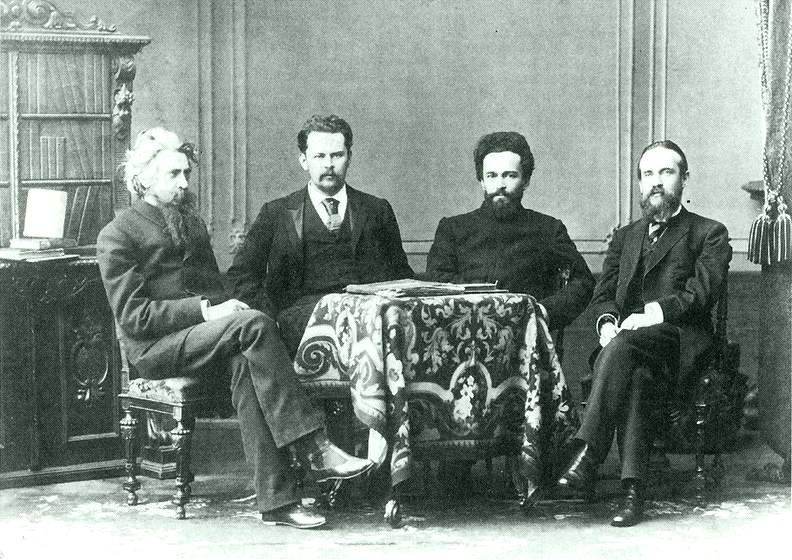
Solovyov, Trubetskoy, N.Y. Grot and Lopatin, photographed in 1893.

In 1886, Trubetskoy became acquainted with the philosopher Vladimir Solovyov, who held largely the same views about religion as Trubetskoy and became his close friend.

In 1890 Trubetskoy became Professor of Philosophy at Moscow University. Later he played a significant role in the Russian liberal movement; he was a founding member of Beseda.

Sergey Trubetskoy was one of several philosophers who complained that there in practice was no real autocracy, as all the entanglement of government agencies made it unsure where the power truly lay; in 1900 he wrote: 'There is an autocracy of policemen and land captains, of governors department heads, and ministers, but a unitary Tsarist autocracy, in the proper sense of the word, does not and cannot exist'.

In 1904 the Trubetskoy wrote of the conflict with Japan, contending that Russia was defending the entire European civilisation from 'the yellow danger, the new hordes of Mongols armed with modern technology', being one of many Russian academics seeing the conflict as a 'crusade', a war between civilisation and barbarism; it led an 'educated liberal' to see the conflict as one against the hordes of Asia.

Trubetskoy had attained the position of Professor of Philosophy at Moscow University by 1904. In 1905 he was elected rector of Moscow University; but he died just a month later, of a brain haemorrhage.

== Family ==
Nikolai Trubetskoy, the linguist, was his son.

Trubetskoy's brother, Evgenii Nikolaevitch Troubetzkoy (1863–1920), was also a philosopher and a professor at Moscow University, who largely shared his brother's beliefs. Evgenii Trubetskoy died of typhus in Crimea while he was trying to emigrate.

Vladimir Troubetskoi, a distinguished officer in WWI, exiled in the Soviet Union and shot and killed in 1937. His daughters and wife were killed there as well

== Works and beliefs ==
Working in the same field as Solovyov, Trubetskoy sought to establish a philosophic foundation for an Orthodox Christian worldview, which would be equally rooted in faith and reason. In 1890 he defended his Master's thesis, "Metaphysics in Ancient Greece", in which he argued that the Holy Scripture and Christian theology largely stemmed directly from the idealistic philosophy of ancient Greece.

The religious beliefs of Trubetskoy are sometimes identified as "Christocentrism", wherein the Church serves as a continuation of the Incarnation of Christ to convey divine precepts to society. These views are set forth in Trubetskoy's work, The Teaching on Logos. Trubetskoy believed that the personality of Jesus Christ, which united the human and divine wills, is crucial for understanding of all aspects and dimensions of Christianity. He viewed Christian teaching not solely as a set of ethical norms but as a system of truth which can be perceived and understood exclusively through special revelation (see fideism). His viewpoint differed both from the official doctrine of the Eastern Orthodox Church and from the beliefs of liberal intellectuals, who reduced the Christian faith to an egalitarian ethic.

== Bibliography ==
- Figes, Orlando (2014). A People's Tragedy: The Russian Revolution 1891–1924. London: The Bodley Head. ISBN 9781847922915.
