= Ada Trevanion =

British poet and author

- Born: 1829
- Died: 11 February 1882
- Occupations: Poet, writer
- Parents: Henry Trevanion (father); Georgiana Leigh (mother)

Ada Trevanion (1829 – 11 February 1882) was a British poet and writer.

Ada Trevanion was born in the summer of 1829, the youngest of three daughters of Henry Trevanion, a minor poet, and his third cousin Georgiana Leigh, the eldest daughter of Augusta Leigh. They married despite the objections of Georgiana's father, Col. George Leigh. Henry Trevanion later began a relationship with his wife's younger sister, Elizabeth Medora Leigh, a woman whose father was thought to be actually Lord Byron, Augusta Leigh's half brother. Though the Trevanions struggled for money their entire lives, Ada Trevanion eventually inherited £28,000 from the Byron estate.

Trevanion frequently published poems in magazines and published a collection of verse, Poems (1858), which contained a number of romantic poems on the themes of doomed women, ghosts, and death. The book was poorly reviewed and attracted little notice. One 20th century literary scholar found that the pages of the Bodleian Library's copy of the book were uncut, indicating that it had never been read.

Trevanion's ghost story "A Ghost Story" was initially published in The Ladies’ Companion and Monthly Magazine in 1857 and in revised form in the National Magazine in 1858. The story is narrated by Ruth Irvine, a student at a girls' boarding school who develops a close relationship with one of her teachers, Miss Winter. While Winter is away from the school, an apparition of the teacher repeatedly appears to Ruth, who later learns that Winter has died. The 1858 version of the story has attracted scholarly attention by critics who have detected a lesbian subtext in the relationship between Irvine and Winter.

Ada Trevanion died on 11 February 1882 in Brixton Hill, London.

== Bibliography ==
- Poems. London, 1858.
