= Evgenii Troubetzkoy =

Russian philosopher (1863–1920)

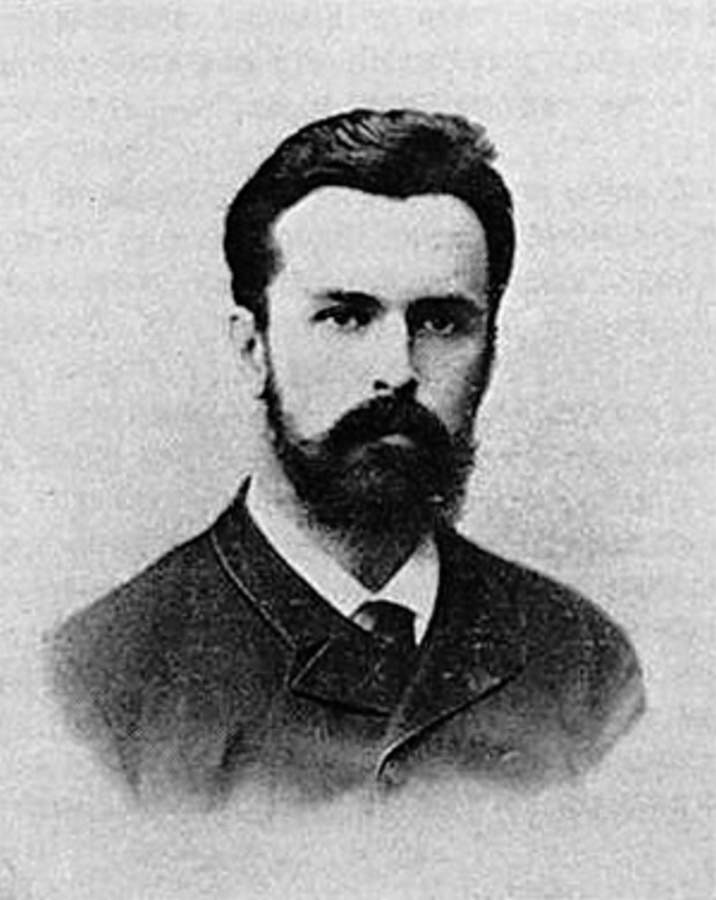
Evgenii Nikolaevitch Troubetzkoy

Prince Evgeny Nikolayevitch Trubetskoy (Troubetzkoy, Russian: Евге́ний Никола́евич Трубецко́й; 5 October 1863 – 5 February 1920) was a Russian philosopher and a follower of Vladimir Solovyov. He was the son of Prince Nikolai Petrovitch Trubetskoy, co-founder of the Moscow Conservatory, and Sophia Alekseievna Lopouchina. His mother was a big influence on his religious thought. He was close to his brother, Sergei Nikolaevich Trubetskoy, who was also a philosopher. Trubetskoy studied law at Moscow University, graduating in 1885, and soon turned to philosophy. In 1892 he earned a master's degree in philosophy on a study of Augustine, and later a doctorate (1897) for work on Pope Gregory VII.

Russian paleontologist and Christian apologist Alexander V. Khramov (Borissiak Paleontological Institute of the Russian Academy of Sciences, Ph.D. from Moscow University) attributes his ideas about an atemporal human fall to Troubetzkoy and Nikolai Berdyaev.

== Family ==
His daughter Khrystyna Sushko studied at the medical faculty of Lausanne University, served as a medic on the Southwestern Front of World War I and was married to a prince from the noble Dolgorukov family. After her first husband's death at the frontline, she remarried Roman Sushko, one of the founders of Sich Riflemen, a unit of the Ukrainian People's Army. Khrystia, as she was known in Ukrainian, enlisted into the 6th Rifle Division and became an officer, possibly the only woman with this rank in the army of the Ukrainian People's Republic. After fighting in the war and fleeing from Bolshevik imprisonment, Khrystyna Sushko ended up in an internment camp in Poland and later moved to France. In her later career she worked as a doctor and helped displaced persons in the American occupation zone in Germany. She died in 1967.
