= Ulla Trenter =

Swedish writer (1936–2019)

Ulla Elisabet Trenter Palm (née Andersson; 18 December 1936 – 23 December 2019) was a Swedish author and translator. She wrote twenty-three whodunit crime books, continuing a series begun by her first husband, Stieg Trenter. Their daughter is author Laura Trenter.

== Life ==
Trenter was born in Stockholm in 1936. Her mother was director Elisabeth Andersson (née Kindgren) and her father was an office clerk. Trenter was married to crime write Stieg Trenter from 1960 until his death in 1967. They had three children, one of whom is author Laura Trenter. The Trenters lived in Florence, Rome and Stockholm. Trenter worked with her husband on his books, working out plots together with him and becoming responsible for all the dialogue. When Stieg died suddenly of a heart attack in 1967, Trenter settled in Stockholm, and finished the book they had just started writing, Rosenkavaljeren. When it received positive reviews, Trenter decided to continue the book series and characters in Stieg's style, writing a further twenty-three novels.

Trenter ran courses on how to write 'whodunit' books, together with journalist and reviewer Kerstin Matz. She also worked as a translator, translating works from English and Italian, including three crim novels by Gianrico Carofiglio, and works by Nicolai Lilin and Peter Tremayne. She also translated Laura Thompson's biography of Agatha Christie.

Trenter remarried in 1969 with the Chancellor Johan Palm (1930–1999). They had a daughter together.

Ulla Trenter was active as a politician in the Centre Party.

Trenter died on 23 December 2019, aged 83 years.

== Bibliography ==
- 1967 - Rosenkavaljeren (started by Stieg Trenter)
- 1968 - Kungens lilla piga
- 1969 - Påfågeln
- 1970 - Odjuret
- 1971 - Gästen
- 1972 - Skatten
- 1973 - Kedjan
- 1974 - Sov i ro
- 1975 - Tigerhajen
- 1976 - Drakblodet
- 1977 - En gång är ingen gång
- 1978 - De dödas lott
- 1979 - Kartan
- 1979 - Mariefred Staden Slottet Omgivningarna (together with Harry Karlsson)
- 1980 - Skyddsänglarna
- 1981 - Roten till det onda
- 1982 - Döda rummet
- 1983 - Rika barn leka häst
- 1984 - Grodmuggen
- 1985 - Som man bäddar
- 1986 - Värsta möjliga tystnad
- 1987 - En död liten stuga
- 1988 - Döden i rikssalen
- 1989 - De röda cirklarna
- 1991 - Sköna juveler
- 1999 - Lustmord (together with Inger Jalakas)
