= Laura Trenter =

Swedish author (born 1961)

Laura Trenter (born 29 May 1961 in Stockholm) is a Swedish author. She is the daughter of Stieg Trenter and Ulla Trenter. Aside from novels she has written guide books and picture books and has made computer games.

Trenter has been a journalist at Kvällsposten. She has been called the "Children's crime fiction queen" (Swedish: 'Barnens deckardrotttning'). In 2003 she received Gothenburg Book Fair's price as the best novel author.

== Bibliography ==
- 1994 - Pojkarna Puckelbros bilbekymmer (together with Joakim Lindengren)
- 1995 - Parisresan (together with Katrin Ehlers)
- 1996 - Moster Jajjas katter (together with Joakim Lindengren)
- 1997 - Londonresan (together with Katrin Ehlers)
- 1997 - Mysteriet med Molly Mercedes (together with Joakim Lindengren)
- 1998 - Hjälp! Rånare!
- 1999 - Det brinner!
- 2000 - Äventyr på Gripsholms slott (together with Erika Kovanen)
- 2000 - Pappa polis
- 2001 - Gräv efter spår (together with Erika Kovanen)
- 2001 - Snögrottan
- 2001 - Den svarta portföljen (together with Magnus Bard)
- 2002 - Julian & Jim
- 2003 - Fotoalbumet (together with Katrin Ehlers)
- 2004 - Puman
- 2005 - Det lysande ögat (together with Tony Manieri)
- 2005 - Dagboken (together with Katrin Ehlers)
- 2006 - Stackelstrands hemlighet (together with Tony Marieri)
- 2007 - Testamentet (together with Katrin Ehlers)
