= Stieg Trenter =

Swedish journalist and writer (1914–1967)

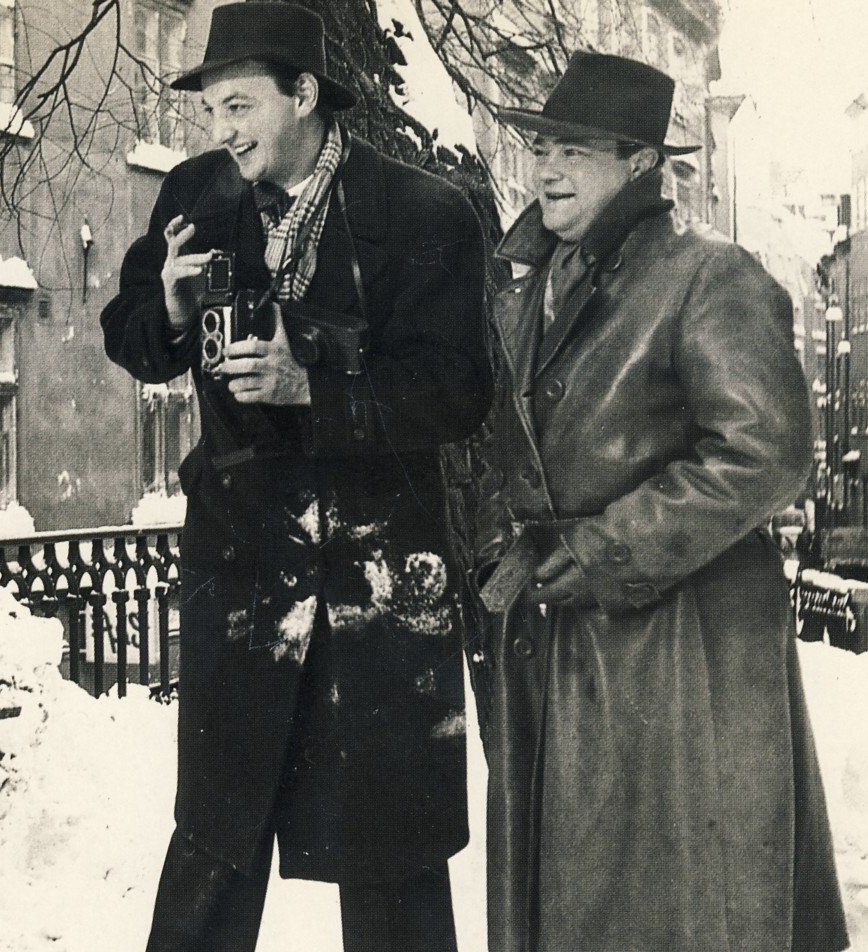
- Trenter (right) and photographer K. W. Gullers
- Born: Stig Johansson; 14 August 1914; Stockholm, Sweden
- Died: 4 July 1967 (aged 0)
- Occupations: Journalist; writer
- Spouse: Ulla Anderson (m. 1960)
- Children: Laura
- Writing career
- Pen name: Stieg Trenter
- Genre: Crime fiction

Stieg Ivar Trenter (14 August 1914 – 4 July 1967) was a Swedish journalist and popular crime writer.

== Biography ==
Born Stig Johansson in Stockholm, he started out by using the name Stieg Trenter as pseudonym but soon changed his name to this in real life as well. His first novel was Ingen kan hejda döden ("No One Can Stop Death"), published in 1943.

Stieg Trenter was a crime writer. The main characters in many of his books are crime investigating press photographer Harry Friberg and his crime solving partner Detective Inspector Vesper Johnson. New editions of his books continue to be published.

His plots has been called adequate by some experts and praised by others. His investigating main character is Friberg, from whose perspective the story is told, and this character is said to have been based upon the press photographer K.W. Gullers, Trenter's friend.

His book series on Harry Friberg contains 23 books. These books are his most famous but he also published other independent crime novels.

Stieg Trenter married the author Ulla Trenter in 1960. They are parents of the author Laura Trenter.

== Works ==
- Ingen kan hejda döden ("No One Can Stop Death") (1943)
- Som man ropar... ("As You Shout...") (1944)
- Farlig fåfänga ("Dangerous Vanity") (1944)
- I dag röd... ("Today Red...") (1945)
- Lysande landning ("Perfect Landing") (1946)
- Det kom en gäst ("There Was A Guest") (1947) (screenplay)
- Tragiskt telegram ("Tragic Telegram") (1947)
- Träff i helfigur ("Point Blank") (1948)
- Eld i håg ("Fire In Mind") (1949)
- Lek lilla Louise ("Play, Little Louise") (1950)
- Ristat i sten ("Carved in Stone") (1952)
- Gamla stan ("Old Town") (1953)
- Aldrig näcken ("Not the Nix) (1953)
- Roparen ("The Megaphone") (1954)
- Tiga är silver ("Silence Is Silver") (1955)
- Narr på nocken ("The Fool on the Ridge) (1956)
- Kalla handen ("Cold Hand") (1957)
- Springaren ("The Runner"/"The Knight") (1958)
- Dockan till Samarkand ("The Puppet for Samarkand") (1959)
- Skuggan ("The Shadow") (1960)
- Färjkarlen ("The Ferryman") (1961)
- Sturemordet ("The Sture Murder") (1962)
- Dvärgarna ("The Dwarfs") (1963)
- Guldgåsen ("The Golden Goose") (1964)
- Tolfte Knappen ("The Twelfth Button") (1965)
- Sjöjungfrun ("The Mermaid") (1966)
- Rosenkavaljeren ("The Knight of the Rose") (1967)
- De döda fiskarna och andra spänningsberättelser (2001) (new published short crime stories)
